= Select Committee on the Modernisation of the House of Commons =

Committee in the UK Parliament

The Select Committee on the Modernisation of the House of Commons (frequently shortened to Modernisation of the House of Commons Committee) is a select committee of the House of Commons in the Parliament of the United Kingdom that was created early in the 1997–2001, 2001–2005, 2005–2010, and 2024–present Parliaments. It ceased to exist at the end of the 2005–10 Parliament, and the Government chose not to propose its reappointment in the Parliament following the 2010 election.

The Committee was first established on 4 June 1997 for the life of the Parliament (until 2001) with a remit to "consider how the practices and procedures of the House should be modernised, and to make recommendations thereon". It was composed of 15 MPs and chaired by the Leader of the House of Commons. It was recreated on 16 July 2001 and 13 July 2005 on similar terms.

Following the election of a Labour Government in July 2024, a new modernisation committee was created. This committee has 14 MPs and is established on terms similar to former iterations of this committee.

== Chairs ==
Committee chairs include those listed below.

Name	Start	End	Party	Constituency
Ann Taylor	2 May 1997	27 July 1998	Labour	Dewsbury
Margaret Beckett	27 July 1998	8 June 2001	Labour	Derby South
Robin Cook	8 June 2001	17 March 2003	Labour	Livingston
John Reid	4 April 2003	13 June 2003	Labour	Hamilton North and Bellshill
Peter Hain	13 June 2003	6 May 2005	Labour	Neath
Geoff Hoon	6 May 2005	5 May 2006	Labour	Ashfield
Jack Straw	5 May 2006	27 June 2007	Labour	Blackburn
Harriet Harman	27 June 2007	11 May 2010	Labour	Camberwell and Peckham
Lucy Powell	9 September 2024	9 September 2025	Labour Co-op	Manchester Central
Alan Campbell	9 September 2025	present	Labour	Tynemouth

== Membership ==
Membership of the committee is as follows:

Member	Party	Constituency
Alan Campbell MP (Chair)	Labour	Tynemouth
Alex Barros-Curtis MP	Labour	Cardiff West
Markus Campbell-Savours MP	Labour	Penrith and Solway
Wendy Chamberlain MP	Liberal Democrats	North East Fife
Christopher Chope MP	Conservative	Christchurch
Bobby Dean MP	Liberal Democrats	Carshalton and Wallington
Kirith Entwistle MP	Labour	Bolton North East
Daniel Francis MP	Labour	Bexleyheath and Crayford
Amanda Hack MP	Labour	North West Leicestershire
Paulette Hamilton MP	Labour	Birmingham Erdington
Rachel Hopkins MP	Labour	Luton South and South Bedfordshire
John Lamont MP	Conservative	Berwickshire, Roxburgh and Selkirk
Jesse Norman MP	Conservative	Hereford and South Herefordshire
Jo Platt MP	Labour	Leigh and Atherton

=== Changes since 2024 ===
Date	Outgoing Member & Party	Constituency	→	New Member & Party	Constituency	Source
18 November 2024	Chris Philp MP (Conservative)	Croydon South	→	Jesse Norman MP (Conservative)	Hereford and South Herefordshire	Hansard
4 March 2025	Mike Amesbury MP (Independent)	Runcorn and Helsby	→	Chris Vince MP (Labour)	Harlow	Hansard
9 September 2025	Lucy Powell MP (Labour)	Manchester Central	→	Alan Campbell (Labour)	Tynemouth	Hansard
15 September 2025	Joy Morrissey MP (Conservative)	Beaconsfield	→	John Lamont MP (Conservative)	Berwickshire, Roxburgh and Selkirk	Hansard
15 October 2025	Marie Goldman MP (Liberal Democrats)	Chelmsford	→	Bobby Dean MP (Liberal Democrats)	Carshalton and Wallington	Hansard
8 December 2025	Chris Elmore MP (Labour)	Bridgend	→	Daniel Francis MP (Labour)	Bexleyheath and Crayford	Hansard
8 December 2025	Sarah Coombes MP (Labour)	West Bromwich	→	Rachel Hopkins MP (Labour)	Luton South and South Bedfordshire	Hansard
8 December 2025	Chris Vince MP (Labour)	Harlow	→	Leigh Ingham MP (Labour)	Stafford	Hansard
23 June 2026	Leigh Ingham MP (Labour)	Stafford	→	Amanda Hack MP (Labour)	North West Leicestershire	Hansard

== See also ==
- Parliamentary committees of the United Kingdom
