= Herbert Craig =

British Liberal Party politician, businessman and barrister

Herbert Craig

Captain Herbert James Craig CBE VD ADC (30 September 1869 – 18 March 1934) was a British Liberal Party politician, Royal Naval Volunteer Reserve officer, businessman, barrister and amateur sportsman who played cricket for Cambridge University and lawn tennis.

== Background ==
He was born the son of James Craig MP and Kate Sophia Hould. He was educated at Rugby School and Trinity College, Cambridge. He married, in 1909, Elsie Rundall.

== Career ==
Craig was called to the bar in 1892 at the Inner Temple, and practised on the North-Eastern Circuit. He served as a Justice of the Peace in Northumberland.

He served as Liberal MP for Tynemouth from 1906 to 1918. He was elected for the first time at 1906 general election, standing for the first time and gaining the seat from the Conservatives. He was re-elected at both the January 1910 December 1910 general elections.

He served in the Royal Naval Volunteer Reserve (Tyneside division), reaching the rank of Commander during World War I.

At the 1918 general election, when Liberal MPs were forced to choose between support for Lloyd George's government or Asquith's opposition, he was absent from the Maurice debate division. He then sought government endorsement for his candidature but the 'coupon' was issued to his Unionist opponent, and he lost his seat at the 1918.

He stood again at the 1922 general election, trying to regain his seat. However, he was unsuccessful and did not stand for parliament again.

He was head of the firm, Borries, Craig & Co., Ltd, export merchants and shipbrokers, of Newcastle upon Tyne. He was a Commander in the Royal Naval Volunteers and commanded the Tyne Division from 1920 to 1929. He was an Aide-de-camp from 1926 to 1929. He was appointed a CBE in 1929.

=== Election results ===
General election January 1906: Tynemouth
Party	Candidate	Votes	%	±%
Liberal	Herbert Craig	4,286	54.9	
Conservative	Frederick Leverton-Harris	3,522	45.1	
Turnout			86.6	
Majority		764	9.8	
Liberal gain from Conservative		Swing		

General election January 1910: Tynemouth
Party	Candidate	Votes	%	±%
Liberal	Herbert Craig	4,487	52.9	
Conservative	E.G. Spencer-Churchill	3,993	47.1	
Turnout			83.3	
Majority		494	5.8	
Liberal hold		Swing		

General election December 1910: Tynemouth
Party	Candidate	Votes	%	±%
Liberal	Herbert Craig	4,106	51.1	
Conservative	Charles Percy	3,939	48.9	
Turnout			79.4	
Majority		177	2.2	
Liberal hold		Swing		

General election 1918: Tynemouth
Party	Candidate	Votes	%	±%
Unionist	Charles Percy	5,883	34.7	
Liberal	Herbert Craig	5,434	32.2	
Independent Labour	George Harold Humphrey	2,566	15.2	
Independent	Henry Gregg	2,495	14.8	
National	Dixon Scott	517	3.1	
Turnout			63.8	
Majority		449	2.5	
Unionist gain from Liberal		Swing		

General election 1922: Tynemouth
Party	Candidate	Votes	%	±%
Unionist	Alexander Russell	11.244	48.1	
Liberal	Herbert Craig	6,787	29.0	
Labour	George Harold Humphrey	5,362	22.9	
Turnout			83.5	
Majority		4,457	19.1	
Unionist hold		Swing		

== Sources ==
- Who Was Who
- British parliamentary election results 1885–1918, Craig, F. W. S.

Parliament of the United Kingdom
Preceded by Frederick Leverton Harris	Member of Parliament for Tynemouth; 1906 – 1918	Succeeded by Charles Percy
