= 2025 Runcorn and Helsby by-election =

UK parliamentary by-election

- 1 May 2025

Runcorn and Helsby constituency
- Turnout: 46.2% (▼12.5 pp)
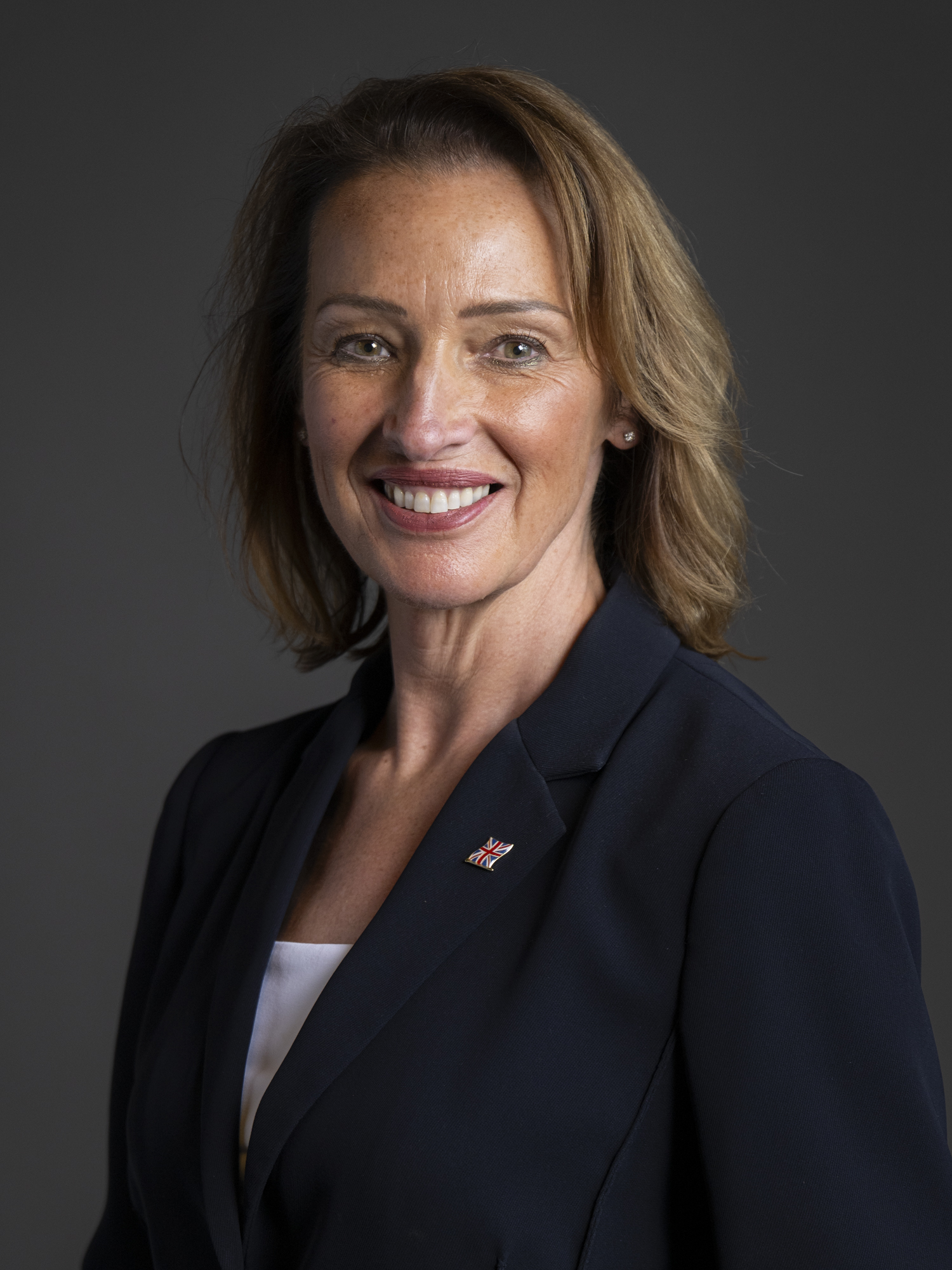
	First party	Second party
Candidate	Sarah Pochin	Karen Shore
Party	Reform	Labour
Popular vote	12,645	12,639
Percentage	38.72%	38.70%
Swing	▲20.6 pp	▼14.2pp
	Third party	Fourth party
Candidate	Sean Houlston	Chris Copeman
Party	Conservative	Green
Popular vote	2,341	2,314
Percentage	7.2%	7.1%
Swing	▼8.8 pp	▲0.7 pp
- Boundary of Runcorn and Helsby in North West England
MP before election
Mike Amesbury
Independent (Note: Although elected for Labour in 2024, Amesbury was sitting as an independent MP at the time of his resignation.)
Elected MP
Sarah Pochin
Reform

A by-election for the United Kingdom parliamentary constituency of Runcorn and Helsby was held on 1 May 2025, the same day as local elections in England. Following a recount, Sarah Pochin of Reform UK won the by-election with a majority of six votes, overturning a Labour majority of 14,696 votes in the last general election. It was the closest British post-war by-election result, and the closest result in a constituency since North East Fife in the 2017 general election.

The by-election was called after the resignation of the constituency's MP, Mike Amesbury, following a conviction for assault. On 24 February 2025, Amesbury was sentenced to ten weeks in prison for assault, which was reduced on appeal to a suspended sentence. This would have triggered a recall petition but Amesbury resigned his seat on 17 March 2025.

== Background ==
Amesbury was first elected as Member of Parliament (MP) for Weaver Vale at the 2017 general election. Weaver Vale was abolished in the 2023 review of Westminster constituencies and largely replaced by the new constituency of Runcorn and Helsby. Amesbury was elected to represent Runcorn and Helsby at the 2024 general election with a majority of almost 15,000.

=== Constituency profile ===
Runcorn and Helsby was created for the 2024 general election as part of the 2023 review of Westminster constituencies, primarily from the seats of Weaver Vale and Halton, with smaller parts of City of Chester and Ellesmere Port and Neston. The town of Runcorn represents approximately two-thirds of the seat, with the remainder primarily being commuter towns. It has been described as suffering the consequences of deindustrialisation.

=== Assault charges and resignation ===
In the early hours of 26 October 2024, Amesbury was filmed in Frodsham repeatedly punching a man. Pending an investigation, he was suspended from the Labour Party. On 7 November 2024, Amesbury was charged with common assault. He pleaded guilty to assault and subsequently resigned from the Labour Party. On 24 February 2025, he was sentenced to ten weeks' imprisonment. On 27 February, an appeal was heard, and the sentence was suspended, although no alteration to the length of the sentence was made. The Recall of MPs Act 2015 is triggered by any custodial sentence, even if suspended, meaning a recall petition would be initiated.

Labour and Reform UK were among those who called for Amesbury to resign to remove the need for a recall petition and directly trigger a by-election. On 10 March 2025, Amesbury said he would stand down at the earliest opportunity. He officially tendered his resignation on 17 March 2025 and was appointed steward of the Chiltern Hundreds the same day. The writ to trigger the by-election was tendered on 27 March 2025, with the by-election scheduled for 1 May 2025, the same day as local elections in England. It was the first by-election since Keir Starmer took office as prime minister in July 2024.

== Campaign ==
The by-election was characterised in the media as a fight between Labour and Reform UK. According to the William Hill bookmakers, as of 10 March, Reform UK were the favourites to win the by-election with 4/9 odds, compared to Labour at 7/4 and the Conservatives at 16/1.

=== Candidates ===
The Labour Party opened its candidate selection process on 8 March 2025 and closed nominations on 9 March 2025. On 13 March, they announced Karen Shore, a former teacher and deputy leader of Cheshire West and Chester Council, as their candidate.

On 24 March 2025, Reform UK announced Sarah Pochin, a former Cheshire East Conservative Party councillor before being expelled from the party in 2020, as their candidate. Pochin stood as a Conservative Party candidate in the 2017 general election for the constituency of Bolton South East. After being expelled from the Conservatives in 2020, she joined the local Independent Group; however, she was also expelled from that group in October 2022 after it emerged that she had re-joined the Conservative Party to vote in its leadership election. According to Reform UK, she has previously worked for Shell International.

The Conservative Party invited by-election candidates to step forward in February before Amesbury's sentencing. On 16 March, they announced Sean Houlston, a National Federation of Builders executive and former candidate for the neighbouring seat of Widnes and Halewood, as their candidate.

The Green Party selected their general election candidate, Chris Copeman, a local councillor in Helsby. On 20 March 2025, the Liberal Democrats selected their candidate, Paul Duffy, a former candidate for Cheshire Police and Crime Commissioner in 2024. On 8 March 2025, Peter Ford, a former British ambassador to Syria and Bahrain from Runcorn, announced his intention to stand for the Workers Party of Britain.

Local finance manager Michael Williams stood as an independent candidate, as did honorary alderman Alan McKie. The Liberal Party candidate was Danny Clarke, a former local Conservative Party chairman who has lived in Runcorn for over 20 years. The Volt UK candidate was Jason Hughes, the party's chairman. Nominations closed at 16:00 on 2 April.

== Result ==
2025 Runcorn and Helsby by-election
Party	Candidate	Votes	%	±%
Reform	Sarah Pochin	12,645	38.72	+20.58
Labour	Karen Shore	12,639	38.70	–14.23
Conservative	Sean Houlston	2,341	7.17	–8.83
Green	Chris Copeman	2,314	7.09	+0.66
Liberal Democrats	Paul Duffy	942	2.88	–2.20
Liberal	Dan Clarke	454	1.39	+0.26
Independent	Michael Williams	363	1.11	New
Independent	Alan McKie	269	0.82	New
Workers Party	Peter Ford	164	0.50	New
Rejoin EU	John Stevens	129	0.40	New
Monster Raving Loony	Howling Laud Hope	128	0.39	New
English Democrat	Catherine Blaiklock	95	0.29	New
SDP	Paul Andrew Murphy	68	0.21	–0.07
Volt	Jason Philip Hughes	54	0.17	New
English Constitution Party	Graham Harry Moore	50	0.15	New
Majority		6	0.02	New
Turnout		32,655	46.21	–12.49
Rejected ballots		85	0.26	–0.14
Registered electors		70,666		
Reform gain from Labour		Swing	+17.41	

Reform UK overturned Labour's 14,696-vote majority from the last general election within 10 months, with Pochin the first non-Labour MP to be elected in Runcorn in over 50 years. The results were significantly delayed when a recount was requested by Labour, after Reform led by just four votes in the first tally. The previous closest post-war by-election, in Berwick-upon-Tweed in 1973, was won by 57 votes. Over 130 years earlier, the 1892 Cirencester by-election officially ended in a tie.

=== Reaction ===
The result was seen as a stunning victory for Reform UK, as well as a major blow to incumbent Prime Minister Keir Starmer, with many Labour MPs singling out the cuts to winter fuel payments as a significant factor in the party's defeat. Former shadow chancellor of the exchequer John McDonnell argued that recent government cuts had made voters feel that the party had turned its back on them. Richard Burgon, Labour MP for Leeds East, called the result "entirely avoidable". Starmer acknowledged that the result was disappointing but defended his government's decisions. Nigel Farage, leader of Reform UK, described the result as a "very big moment" for his party. He also attributed Labour's defeat to a loss of confidence in Starmer's governance, especially voter frustration on immigration.

== Opinion polls ==
The results of opinion polls, compared with the outcome of the 2024 general election, were as follows:

Pollster	Date(s) conducted	Sample size	Lab	Reform	Con	Green	Lib Dem	Others	Lead
2025 by-election	1 May 2025	–	38.70%	38.72%	7.17%	7.09%	2.88%	5.44%	0.02
FindOutNow	12–14 Mar 2025	147	33%	36%	12%	7%	7%	5%	3
Lord Ashcroft	3–12 Mar 2025	702	35%	40%	10%	6%	8%	2%	5
2024 general election	4 Jul 2024	–	52.9%	18.1%	16.0%	6.4%	5.1%	1.4%	34.8

== Previous result ==
General election 2024: Runcorn and Helsby
Party	Candidate	Votes	%	±%
Labour	Mike Amesbury	22,358	52.9	+4.1
Reform	Jason Moorcroft	7,662	18.1	+13.3
Conservative	Jade Marsden	6,756	16.0	–20.8
Green	Chris Copeman	2,715	6.4	+3.5
Liberal Democrats	Chris Rowe	2,149	5.1	–1.6
Liberal	Danny Clarke	479	1.1	N/A
SDP	Paul Murphy	116	0.3	N/A
Rejected ballots		171		
Majority		14,696	34.8	+22.9
Turnout		42,235	58.7	–9.5
Registered electors		71,955		
Labour hold		Swing	–4.6	

Changes are from the notional results of the 2019 election on the new boundaries.

== See also ==
- 2025 United Kingdom local elections (also held on 1 May)
- United Kingdom by-election records
- List of United Kingdom by-elections (2024–present)
