= Alan Campbell (politician) =

British politician (born 1957)

The Right Honourable Sir Alan Campbell MP
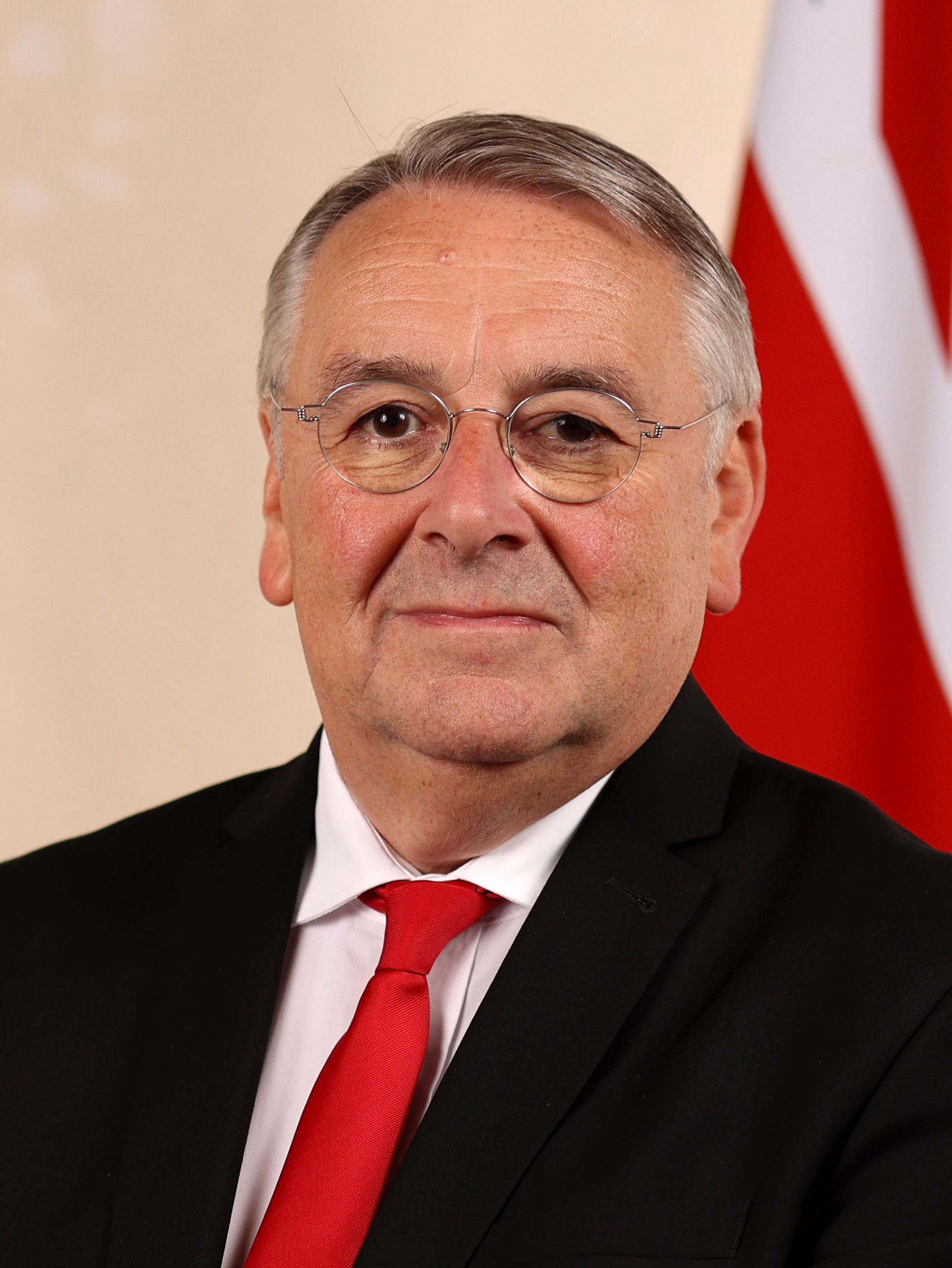
- Official portrait, 2024

Leader of the House of Commons Lord President of the Council
- Incumbent
- Assumed office 5 September 2025
- Prime Minister: Keir Starmer; Andy Burnham
- Preceded by: Lucy Powell

Chair of the Commons Modernisation Committee
- Incumbent
- Assumed office 5 September 2025
- Preceded by: Lucy Powell

Government Chief Whip in the House of Commons Parliamentary Secretary to the Treasury
- In office 5 July 2024 – 5 September 2025
- Prime Minister: Keir Starmer
- Preceded by: Simon Hart
- Succeeded by: Jonathan Reynolds
Shadow portfolios 2010‍–‍2024
Opposition Chief Whip in the House of Commons
In office 9 May 2021 – 5 July 2024
Leader	Keir Starmer
Preceded by	Nick Brown
Succeeded by	Stuart Andrew
Opposition Deputy Chief Whip in the House of Commons
In office 8 October 2010 – 9 May 2021
Leader	Ed Miliband; Harriet Harman (Acting); Jeremy Corbyn; Keir Starmer
Preceded by	John Randall
Succeeded by	Lilian Greenwood
Junior ministerial offices 2006‍–‍2010
Parliamentary Under-Secretary of State for Crime Reduction
In office 5 October 2008 – 11 May 2010
Prime Minister	Gordon Brown
Preceded by	Vernon Coaker
Succeeded by	James Brokenshire
Lord Commissioner of the Treasury
In office 5 May 2006 – 5 October 2008
Prime Minister	Tony Blair; Gordon Brown
Preceded by	Vernon Coaker
Succeeded by	Tony Cunningham

Member of Parliament for Tynemouth
- Incumbent
- Assumed office 1 May 1997
- Preceded by: Neville Trotter
- Majority: 15,455 (31.9%)

Personal details
- Born: 8 July 1957 (age 69) Consett, County Durham, England
- Party: Labour
- Spouse: Jayne Lamont (m. 1991)
- Children: 2
- Education: Lancaster University (BA); University of Leeds (PGCE); Northumbria University (MA)
- Website: www.alancampbellmp.co.uk

Sir Alan Campbell (born 8 July 1957) is a British politician who has served as Leader of the House of Commons and Lord President of the Council since 2025. He previously served as Chief Whip and Parliamentary Secretary to the Treasury from 2024 to 2025. A member of the Labour Party, he has been the Member of Parliament (MP) for Tynemouth since 1997. Before that, he was a schoolteacher.

== Early life and career ==
Alan Campbell was born on 8 July 1957 in Consett and went to Blackfyne Grammar School in the town before attending Lancaster University where he was awarded a BA in politics. He then gained a PGCE at the University of Leeds, before finishing his education at Newcastle Polytechnic with an MA in history.

He began his career as a history teacher at Whitley Bay High School in 1981; after eight years there became head of the sixth form at Hirst High School, Ashington, then head of department, where he remained until he was elected to the House of Commons.

== Parliamentary career ==
=== Early career ===
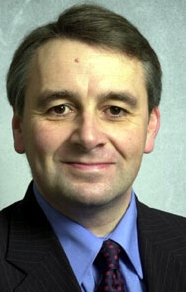
Official portrait, c. 2009

Campbell was first elected to Parliament at the 1997 general election, when he was elected as MP for Tynemouth with 55.4% of the vote and a majority of 11,273 votes. He made his maiden speech on 2 June 1997.

At the 2001 general election Campbell was re-elected as MP for Tynemouth with a decreased vote share of 53.2% and a decreased majority of 8,678. After the election he became the Parliamentary Private Secretary (PPS) to the Minister of State for the Cabinet Office Gus Macdonald, and in 2003 became the PPS to Adam Ingram at the Ministry of Defence.

At the 2005 general election, Campbell was again re-elected, with a decreased vote share of 47% and a decreased majority of 4,143. He entered the government of Tony Blair after the election as an assistant whip, being promoted to a full whip in 2006. On 5 October 2008, Campbell was promoted to the Home Office as a Parliamentary Under-Secretary of State.

=== In opposition ===
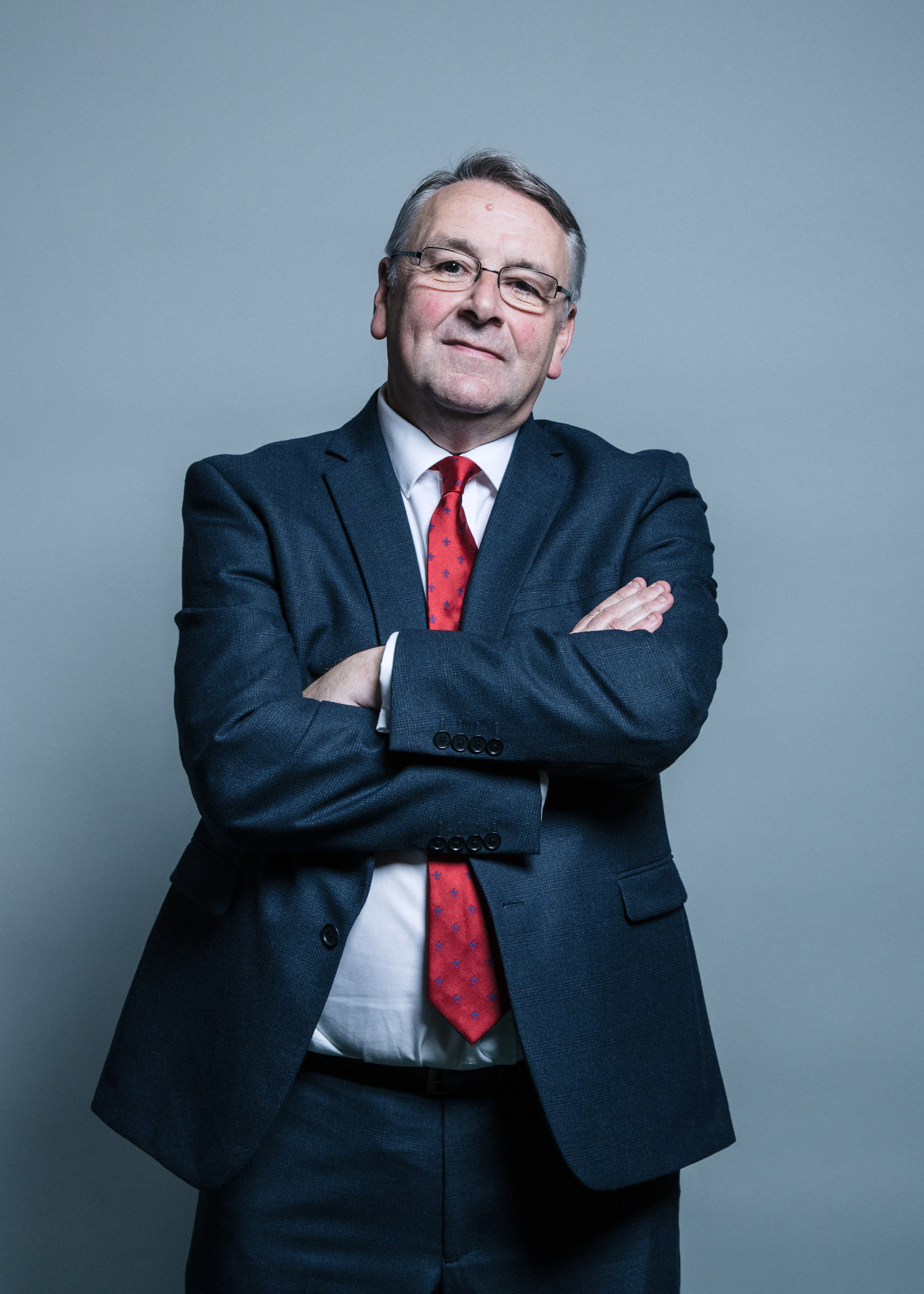
Official portrait, 2017

At the 2010 general election, Campbell was again re-elected, with a decreased vote share of 45.3% and an increased majority of 5,739 votes. After Ed Miliband was appointed party leader, he was appointed Deputy Chief Whip of the Labour Party, serving under Rosie Winterton as Chief Whip.

Campbell was again re-elected at the 2015 general election, with an increased vote share of 48.2% and an increased majority of 8,240. He was again re-elected at the snap 2017 general election with an increased vote share of 57% and an increased majority of 11,666. At the 2019 general election, Campbell was again re-elected, with a decreased vote share of 48% and a decreased majority of 4,857.

=== Return to government ===
==== Chief Whip (2024–2025) ====
===== Appointment =====
At the 2024 general election, Campbell was again re-elected, with an increased vote share of 50.6% and an increased majority of 15,455.

Following the Labour Party's landslide victory in the 2024 general election, on 5 July the new Prime Minister, Keir Starmer, appointed Campbell as Chief Whip of the Labour Party in the House of Commons and as Parliamentary Secretary to the Treasury, which mirrored his previous position as the new Chief Whip of the Labour Party in the May 2021 shadow cabinet reshuffle.

===== Disciplinary affairs =====
In July 2024, Labour withdrew the party whip from seven MPs who voted against the government's position on an amendment relating to the two-child benefit cap. The decision was reported as part of a wider effort by the party leadership to limit internal dissent and reinforce support for the government's legislative programme. Further disciplinary action followed in July 2025 after a number of Labour MPs voted against the government on welfare reform legislation. Campbell wrote to MPs involved in the rebellion, reminding them of their recorded votes and of party expectations regarding support for government policy. Reporting noted that the correspondence contained personalised references to individual voting records and was issued following one of the largest backbench rebellions of the parliamentary term.

Later that month, four Labour MPs were suspended from the parliamentary party for what party officials described as repeated breaches of discipline. Media coverage identified the Chief Whip's office as responsible for implementing and communicating the suspensions, which were framed as part of ongoing efforts to maintain party cohesion. The whip was subsequently restored to the suspended MPs following a period of dialogue between the whips' office and the individuals concerned.

During his tenure, Campbell was also involved in the handling of individual disciplinary matters within the parliamentary party. In early 2025, he informed Labour MP Oliver Ryan of his suspension following an internal investigation into offensive messages shared in a private group. Reporting described the action as part of a broader approach by the party leadership to enforce standards of conduct among MPs. Campbell's approach to discipline attracted criticism from some MPs and political commentators, who argued that the use of suspensions and warnings risked limiting internal debate within the parliamentary party. Coverage characterised these measures as indicative of a more centralised leadership style under Prime Minister Keir Starmer.

===== Other issues =====
During this period, Campbell continued to support government positions in parliamentary divisions. In November 2024, he voted in favour of the Terminally Ill Adults (End of Life) Bill at second reading, allowing the bill to proceed to further scrutiny. In July 2025, he supported the Universal Credit and Personal Independence Payment Bill, which introduced changes to eligibility for certain disability-related benefits, including Personal Independence Payment and the health element of Universal Credit.

==== Leader of the House of Commons (2025–present) ====
In September 2025, Campbell was appointed Leader of the House of Commons and Lord President of the Council as a part of the wider 2025 British cabinet reshuffle. Campbell replaced Lucy Powell, who was sacked from the government. His appointment marked a move from the whips' office into a Cabinet-facing parliamentary role during the second year of the Starmer administration.

In October 2025, Campbell was appointed Chair of the Commons Modernisation Committee, a committee re-established by Lucy Powell in 2024, to examine Commons procedure and working practices. Under his chairmanship, the committee initiated inquiries into accessibility in parliamentary proceedings and the use of proxy voting, as well as the effectiveness of existing sitting arrangements.

On 20 July 2026, Campbell was reappointed by Andy Burnham.

== Personal life ==
He married Jayne Lamont in August 1991 in Newcastle upon Tyne; they have a son and a daughter.

In May 2000, he had an operation at Newcastle General Hospital to remove a benign tumour from the top of his spine.

== Honours ==
In the 2019 New Year Honours, Campbell was knighted "for political service".

Parliament of the United Kingdom
Preceded by Neville Trotter	Member of Parliament for Tynemouth; 1997–present	Incumbent
Preceded by Vernon Coaker	Parliamentary Under-Secretary of State for the Home Office; 2008–2010	Succeeded by Lynne Featherstone
Preceded by John Randall	Opposition Deputy Chief Whip in the House of Commons; 2010–2021	Succeeded by Lilian Greenwood
Preceded by Nick Brown	Opposition Chief Whip in the House of Commons; 2021–2024	Succeeded by Stuart Andrew
Preceded by Simon Hart	Chief Whip of the House of Commons; 2024–2025	Succeeded by Jonathan Reynolds
Preceded by Simon Hart	Parliamentary Secretary to the Treasury; 2024–2025	Succeeded by Jonathan Reynolds
Preceded by Lucy Powell	Leader of the House of Commons; 2025–present	Incumbent
Preceded by Lucy Powell	Lord President of the Council; 2025–present	Incumbent
Party political offices
Preceded by Tommy McAvoy	Labour Deputy Chief Whip in the House of Commons; 2010–2021	Succeeded by Lilian Greenwood
Preceded by Nick Brown	Chief Whip of the Labour Party in the House of Commons; 2021–2025	Succeeded by Jonathan Reynolds
Order of precedence in England and Wales
Preceded by Andy Burnham as Prime Minister	Gentlemen as Lord President of the Council	Succeeded by Sir Lindsay Hoyle as Speaker of the House of Commons
