= Charles Percy (British politician) =

British Conservative politician (1851–1929)

Member of Parliament for Tynemouth
- In office 1918–1922
- Preceded by: Herbert James Craig
- Succeeded by: Alexander West Russell

Personal details
- Born: 1851
- Died: 10 September 1929
- Party: Conservative

Charles Percy (1851 – 10 September 1929) was a British Conservative politician. He was the Member of Parliament (MP) for Tynemouth from 1918 to 1922.

He earlier fought Wansbeck in the January 1910 general election.

Parliament of the United Kingdom
Preceded by Herbert James Craig	Member of Parliament for Tynemouth; 1918 – 1922	Succeeded by Alexander West Russell
