= Grace Colman =

British politician (1892–1971)

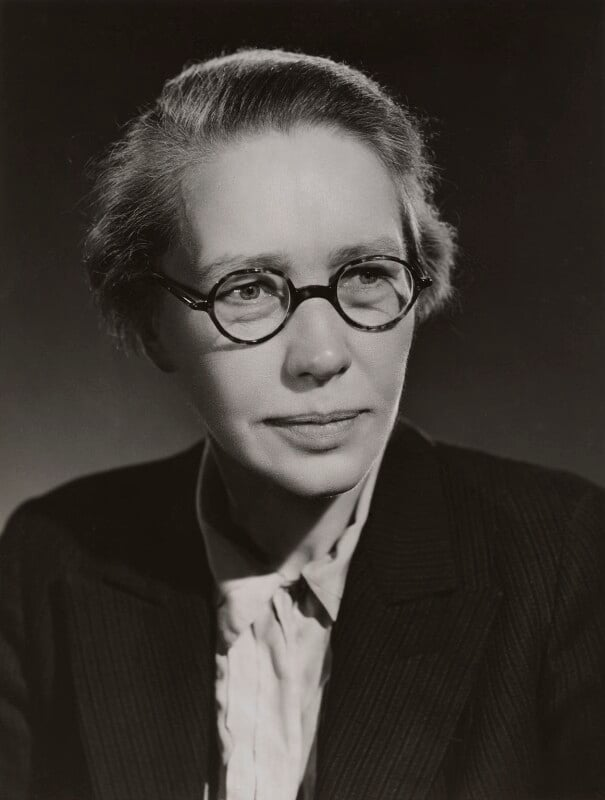
- Colman, c. 1945

Member of Parliament for Tynemouth
- In office 5 July 1945 – 3 February 1950
- Prime Minister: Clement Attlee
- Preceded by: Alexander West Russell
- Succeeded by: Irene Ward

Personal details
- Born: Grace Mary Colman; 30 April 1892
- Died: 7 July 1971 (aged 79)
- Party: Labour

Grace Mary Colman (30 April 1892 – 7 July 1971) was a British politician. She was Labour Member of Parliament (MP) for Tynemouth from 1945 to 1950.

== Early life and education ==
Grace Colman's father was a member of the clergy at Worcester Cathedral, and Grace attended Newnham College, Cambridge. She was a cousin of Academy Award winning actor Ronald Colman.

== Career ==
Colman taught at Ruskin College and the University of London. She was an organiser for the Workers' Educational Association. Later she became a magistrate. She unsuccessfully stood as the Labour candidate in Hythe in 1929 and 1931 and Sheffield Hallam in 1935 before winning the Tynemouth seat in 1945. After her defeat she stood once more in Tynemouth in 1951, again losing to the Conservative candidate, Irene Ward.

Parliament of the United Kingdom
Preceded by Alexander West Russell	Member of Parliament for Tynemouth; 1945–1950	Succeeded by Irene Ward
