= Mike Hall (British politician) =

British politician

Member of Parliament for Weaver Vale
- In office 1 May 1997 – 12 April 2010
- Preceded by: Constituency Created
- Succeeded by: Graham Evans

Member of Parliament for Warrington South
- In office 9 April 1992 – 8 April 1997
- Preceded by: Chris Butler
- Succeeded by: Helen Southworth

Personal details
- Born: 20 September 1952 (age 74) Ashton-under-Lyne, Lancashire, England
- Party: Labour
- Spouse: Lesley Evelyn Gosling
- Children: Thomas Hall
- Education: University of Chester, University of Wales, Bangor

Michael Thomas Hall (born 20 September 1952) is a British Labour Party politician who was the Member of Parliament (MP) for Weaver Vale from 1997 to 2010.

== Early life ==
Mike Hall was born in Ashton-under-Lyne, Lancashire, and educated at St Mary's RC Primary School and St Damian's Catholic Secondary Modern School there. He studied at Padgate Training College, Warrington, where he was awarded a Certificate in Education in 1977. He later returned to the college and received a Bachelor of Education degree in 1987. He completed his studies at the University of Wales, Bangor, where he earned a Postgraduate diploma in education in 1989.

He joined Imperial Chemical Industries in Blackley, Manchester, in 1969 as a scientific laboratory assistant, leaving to go to university in 1973. He became a history and physical education teacher in 1977 in Bolton, where he remained until he became a support teacher with the Halton community assessment team from 1985 until his election to Parliament.

He joined the Labour Party in 1977 and was elected as a councillor to the Warrington Borough Council in 1979. He became Warrington's deputy leader in 1984, and leader for seven years from 1985, before standing down in 1993. He was also elected to the Great Sankey Parish Council for four years from 1979. He served for four years on the Birchwood and Croft Parish Council from 1983.

== Parliamentary career ==
Hall was elected to the House of Commons for Warrington South at the 1992 general election, defeating the sitting Conservative MP Chris Butler by just 191 votes. He made his maiden speech on 6 May 1992. Following boundary changes, at the 1997 general election, he moved from Warrington South to the newly created, nearby constituency of Weaver Vale, which covers Northwich, Frodsham and parts of Runcorn. He won this seat with a safe 13,448 majority, and continued to hold the seat comfortably, albeit with reduced majorities at each subsequent election.

In Parliament he served as a member of the Public Accounts Committee (1992–1997), and became the Parliamentary Private Secretary (PPS) to the Leader of the House of Commons Ann Taylor following the 1997 General Election. He became a member of the Labour government, under Prime Minister Tony Blair, in 1998, when he was appointed as an Assistant Government Whip. He was sacked following the 2001 General Election. From 2001 to 2005 he served as PPS to the Secretary of State for Health, initially under Alan Milburn and, from 2003, his successor, John Reid. He has been a member of the Culture, Media and Sport select committee since the 2005 General Election. From October 2008 onwards he was the PPS to Jack Straw, the Justice Secretary.

In May 2009, it was reported by The Daily Telegraph that he claimed expenses in excess of £15,000 over three years for cleaning products.

On 2 February 2010, Hall announced that he was standing down at the next general election for health reasons.

== Personal life ==
He married Lesley Evelyn Gosling on 2 August 1975 in Ashton-under-Lyne and they have a son, Thomas.

In 2024, his daughter-in-law Sarah Hall was elected as the Member of Parliament in his old constituency Warrington South.
