= Graham Evans, Baron Evans of Rainow =

British politician (born 1963)

The Right Honourable The Lord Evans of Rainow
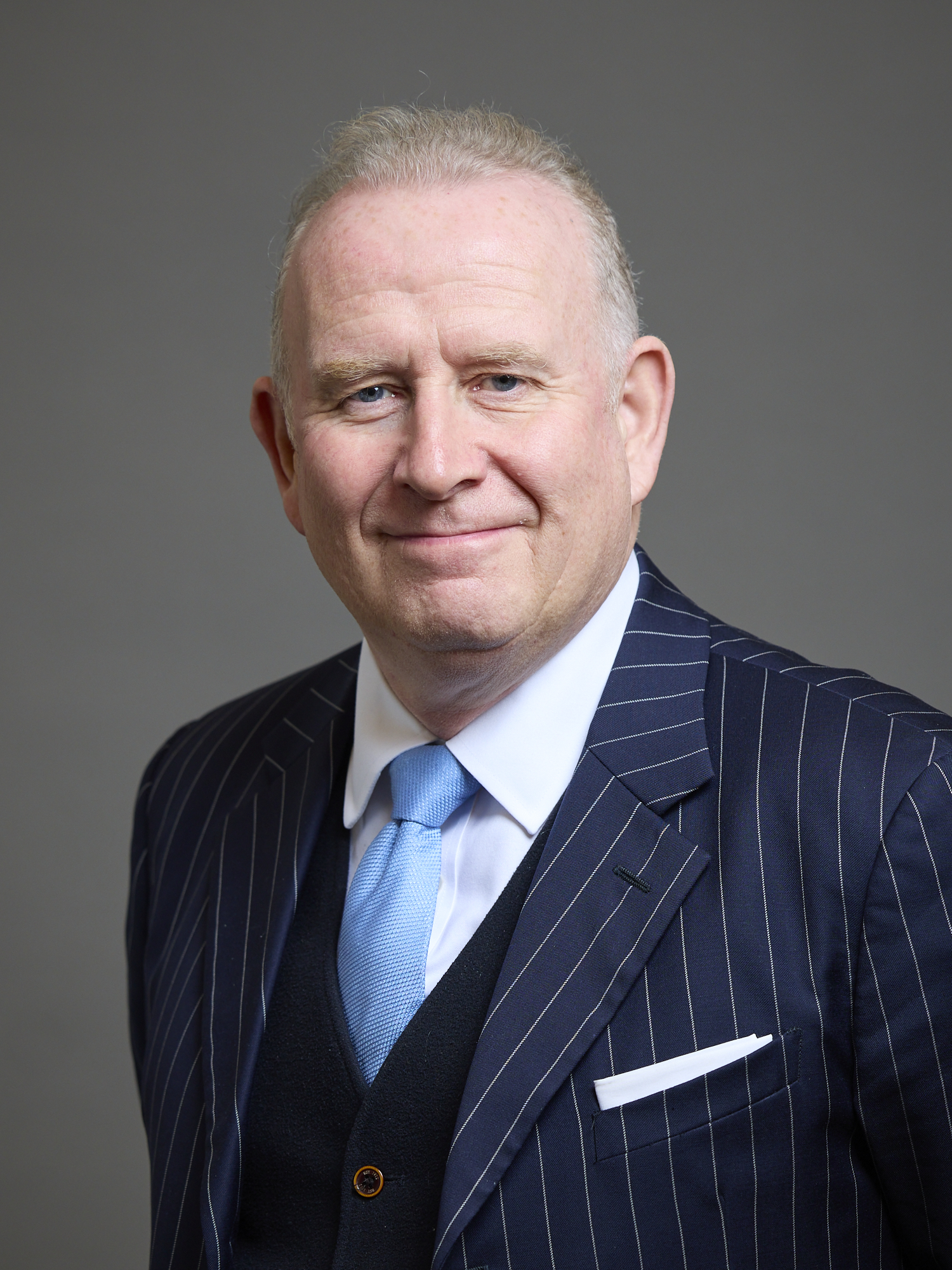
- Official portrait, 2024

Lord-in-waiting Government Whip
- In office 1 January 2023 – 4 July 2024
- Prime Minister: Rishi Sunak
- Preceded by: The Viscount Younger of Leckie

Member of the House of Lords
- Lord Temporal
- Life peerage 9 November 2022

Member of Parliament for Weaver Vale
- In office 6 May 2010 – 3 May 2017
- Preceded by: Mike Hall
- Succeeded by: Mike Amesbury

Personal details
- Born: 10 November 1963 (age 62) Poynton, Cheshire, England
- Party: Conservative
- Spouse: Cheryl Evans
- Children: 3
- Education: Manchester Metropolitan University
- Website: www.grahamevans.org.uk

Graham Thomas Evans, Baron Evans of Rainow (born 10 November 1963) is a British politician who served as the Member of Parliament (MP) for Weaver Vale in Cheshire from 2010 until 2017. A member of the Conservative Party, he was appointed to the House of Lords in 2022.

== Early life and career ==
Evans was born on a council house estate in Poynton, Cheshire. After attending Poynton High School, then a comprehensive school, he left with few qualifications and worked as a shelf stacker at a local supermarket. He went on to study at night school, and graduated from Manchester Metropolitan University with a Business Degree and Diploma in Marketing Management. He then completed an MA from King's College London. He had a successful two decade career in manufacturing, working for companies such as BAE Systems and Hewlett Packard. He spent four years as a Special Constable in the Cheshire Constabulary.

== Political career ==
Evans served ten years as a local councillor at Macclesfield Borough Council, until the council's abolition in 2009.

Evans unsuccessfully contested the 2005 general election for the Worsley constituency. In July 2007, he was selected by an open primary as the Conservative candidate for Weaver Vale. He was elected at the 2010 general election with an 8.1% swing - the highest swing in the country. Graham was re-elected as Member of Parliament for Weaver Vale in 2015.

Evans sat on the Work and Pensions Select Committee after being elected in November 2012. He sat on the backbench 1922 Executive Committee between Autumn 2012 and January 2014.

In January 2014 Evans was appointed Parliamentary Private Secretary to the Rt Hon Greg Barker MP, Minister of State for Energy and Climate Change. From July 2014 until he lost his seat, he served as Parliamentary Private Secretary to the Rt Hon Sir Michael Fallon MP, Secretary of State for Defence.

As MP Evans ran a campaign to reinstate the Halton Curve railway line to connect the villages of Helsby and Frodsham to Halton and Liverpool. The line reopened in 2019. In Parliament he led a Back Bench Business debate for Holocaust Memorial Day on 23 January 2013., introduced a Ten Minute Rule Bill in April 2013 for a National Commonwealth Military Day, and a Private Members' Bill in October 2013 about Drug Driving.

Evans was opposed to Brexit prior to the 2016 referendum.

In May 2016 Graham Evans was among a number of Conservative MPs who were under investigation for possible election fraud by police forces across Britain. Investigations began after evidence was uncovered by Channel 4 News. No charges were brought.

In the snap general election held on 8 June 2017 Evans lost his seat to Labour opponent Mike Amesbury.

It was announced on 14 October 2022, that as part of Boris Johnson's 2022 Political Honours, Evans would be appointed a life peer. On 9 November 2022, he was created Baron Evans of Rainow, of Macclesfield in the County of Cheshire.

It was announced on 11 September 2024 that Evans was appointed honorary president of the National Pubwatch, a position formerly held by Roy Kennedy, Baron Kennedy of Southwark.

== Personal life ==
Evans is married to Cheryl, and the couple have three children: George, Tom and Sophie. He has an interest in British social, economic and political history. He enjoys military history. Evans is a keen sportsman, regularly playing cricket, football and rugby on the Parliamentary teams. He is also a keen runner and has completed the London Marathon six consecutive times.

Parliament of the United Kingdom
Preceded by Mike Hall	Member of Parliament for Weaver Vale; 2010 – 2017	Succeeded by Mike Amesbury
Orders of precedence in the United Kingdom
Preceded by The Lord Hintze	Gentlemen; Baron Evans of Rainow	Followed by The Lord Weir of Ballyholme
