= Sarah Pochin =

British politician and businesswoman (born 1969)

Sarah Pochin MP
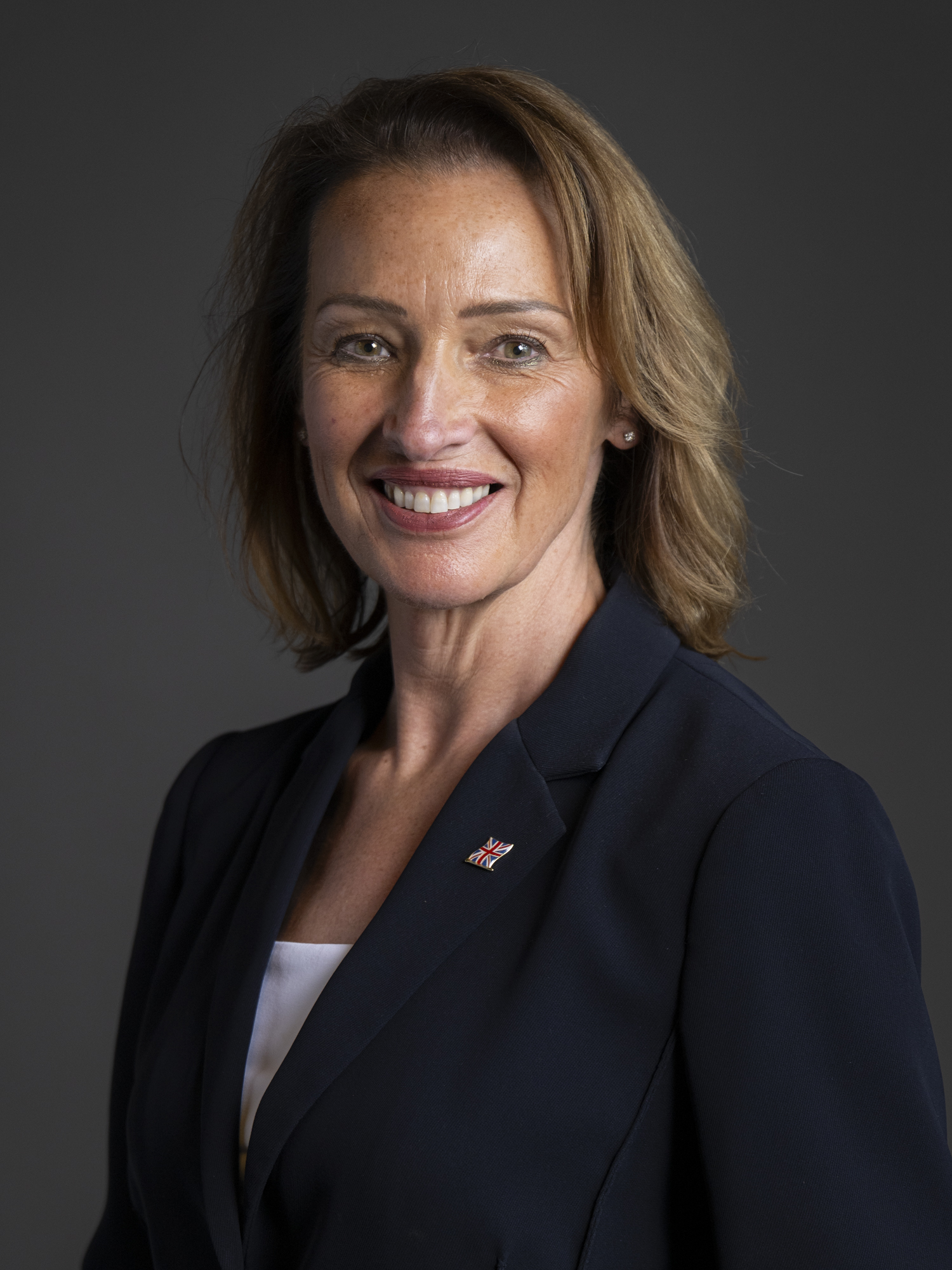
- Official portrait, 2025

Member of Parliament for Runcorn and Helsby
- Incumbent
- Assumed office 1 May 2025
- Preceded by: Mike Amesbury
- Majority: 6 (0.02%)

Mayor of Cheshire East
- In office 25 November 2021 – 19 May 2022
- Preceded by: Barry Burkhill
- Succeeded by: David Marren

Member of Cheshire East Council
- In office 7 May 2015 – 4 May 2023
- Ward: Willaston & Rope (2015–2019); Bunbury (2019–2023)
- Preceded by: Brian Silvester
- Succeeded by: Rebecca Posnett

Personal details
- Born: Sarah Joanne Hyde; June 1969 (age 57) Gloucestershire, England, UK
- Party: Reform UK (since 2025)
- Other political affiliations: Conservative (until 2020; 2022); Independent (2020–2022; 2022–2025)
- Spouse: Jonathan Pochin (m. 1996)
- Children: 2
- Education: Loughborough University (BSc)
- Website: www.sarahpochin.uk

Sarah Joanne Pochin (Note: Pronounced /ˈpəʊt͡ʃɪn/.) (née Hyde, born June 1969) is a British politician who has been the Member of Parliament (MP) for Runcorn and Helsby since a by-election in May 2025. She is Reform UK’s first female MP. She was previously the Mayor of Cheshire East and a local councillor, as well as a justice of the peace (JP).

Formerly a Conservative councillor who later sat as an independent member, she left the party and joined Reform UK. She currently holds the record for the smallest margin of victory in modern British by-election history, having overturned Labour's 14,700 majority from the 2024 general election to win by just six votes.

== Early life and career ==
Born in June 1969, she was educated at Haberdashers' Monmouth School for Girls from 1980 to 1987, a boarding and day private school. She then studied banking and finance at Loughborough University, graduating with a BSc in 1991.

Pochin has lived in Cheshire for over 30 years. She served as a justice of the peace, and worked for Shell plc and Novar plc, and later in the DIY sector.

Pochin was reprimanded in 2018 by the Judicial Conduct Investigations Office (JCIO) for misconduct during her tenure as a magistrate. The JCIO determined that Pochin used her judicial position to influence colleagues' views in a political context and breached confidentiality by publicising the complaint against her. The JCIO stated that her actions "fell below the standards expected of a magistrate". In 2025, Reform leader Nigel Farage said the allegations were politically motivated.

== Political career ==
=== Local government ===
Pochin entered politics as a member of the Conservative Party, representing the Willaston and Rope ward after gaining the seat from scandal-ridden Brian Silvester of UKIP in the 2015 Cheshire East Council election. Pochin stood as the Conservative candidate in the Bolton South East constituency at the 2017 general election, where she was defeated by incumbent Labour MP, Yasmin Qureshi. In the 2019 Cheshire East Council election, Pochin stood for the Bunbury ward, where she was elected.

In March 2020, a rift occurred between Pochin and her Conservative colleagues on the council when she accepted the position of Mayor of Cheshire East, a role offered by the governing Labour-Independent administration. She took over the position following Mayor Barry Burkhill's role in the Handforth Town Council incident involving Jackie Weaver. This decision led to her suspension and subsequent expulsion from the Conservative Group on the council, as it was seen as a breach of party rules. Following her expulsion, Pochin continued to serve as an independent member of the council. Originally slated to become mayor during the 2020/21 municipal year, she instead assumed the role in 2021/22 due to the COVID-19 pandemic, which caused the postponement of the scheduled swearing-in ceremony.

In 2022, Pochin rejoined the Conservative Party to participate in the July–September 2022 Conservative Party leadership election. This move led to her suspension from the Cheshire East Independent Group, as it violated the group's rules against holding membership in political parties.

=== Parliament ===
Pochin was announced as the Reform UK candidate for the 2025 Runcorn and Helsby by-election, which was triggered when Mike Amesbury resigned as MP following an assault conviction due to a physical altercation with a constituent.

She defeated Karen Shore of the Labour Party, overturning the 14,700-vote majority Labour achieved at the general election less than 10 months earlier, by 6 votes, the narrowest parliamentary by-election majority in modern British history. The win came amidst an increase in support for Reform UK in local elections held across the country the same day which were seen as a key test of the popularity of the Starmer government. Winning made her the first non-Labour MP elected in Runcorn in over fifty years, and the first ever female MP for the Reform UK party.

She made her maiden speech on 12 May 2025, in a debate on the Border Security, Asylum and Immigration Bill. She started by "saying how delighted I am that my colleagues have dragged themselves out of the pub to join me for my maiden speech" and went on to say that she was making her speech unusually early because "the Bill is important because it is so relevant to what I believe in. There are over 900 illegal immigrants—that we know about—living in Runcorn." She described her constituency as having "beautiful, leafy villages and housing estates battling drug crime and antisocial behaviour" and "lots of wonderful businesses in the constituency, ranging from the chemical industry and the farming industry right through to the science park".

She first spoke at Prime Minister's Questions (PMQs) on 4 June 2025, about banning the Burka, asking "Given the Prime Minister's desire to strengthen strategic alignment with our European neighbours, will he, in the interests of public safety, follow the lead of France, Denmark, Belgium and others and ban the burqa?" On 5 June 2025, Reform UK Chairman Zia Yusuf insinuated the question was "dumb", posting on X: "Nothing to do with me. Had no idea about the question nor that it wasn't policy. Busy with other stuff. I do think it's dumb for a party to ask the PM if they would do something the party itself wouldn't do." Yusuf subsequently resigned as Reform UK chairman prompting media speculation that this was over Pochin's question. However, Yusuf subsequently reversed his decision and stated that his resignation had been brought on by fatigue and clarified that if he were an MP he would "probably" vote in favour of banning the burqa. Pochin and other Reform MPs expressed their support for Yusuf's return.

Pochin said in July 2025 that she had received "disturbing reports" about incidents of anti-social behaviour happening in a street in her constituency, which she attributed to houses of multiple occupation housing immigrants; however, some residents of the street in question said the reports were "untrue" and the Cheshire Constabulary said it had received no such reports. In an open letter written by the warden of St Michael and All Angels church, Robert Littler, a resident of the street for 30 years said Pochin was trying to fulfil a "personal agenda" and accused Pochin of "scaremongering and hate-stirring and talking down a town which you were elected to represent". Another resident of the street for almost 40 years said that Pochin did not speak for her and a resident of the street of eight years said of Pochin, "Not anything that she has said is real". Pochin said the open letter "contains numerous falsehoods, personal attacks, and political smears that bear no resemblance to the reality on the ground".

While discussing the advertising industry, in a TalkTV interview in October 2025, Pochin said that a caller who complained about the "demographics" of advertising was "absolutely right" and "it drives me mad when I see adverts full of black people, full of Asian people". Pochin later apologised and said that she was attempting to highlight that the advertising industry had gone "DEI mad". In her statement, Pochin cited a Channel 4 study which established that the proportion of adverts featuring black people rose from 37% in 2020 to 51% in 2022. For comparison, 4% of the population of England and Wales in the 2021 census were black. She insisted she was not racist, but that her comments had been "phrased poorly" and that many adverts were "unrepresentative of British society". Reform UK leader Nigel Farage described the comments as "wrong and ugly" but said they were made "in a broader context of DEI madness in the advertising industry".

During the 2026 FIFA World Cup, Pochin congratulated the England national football team on their opening victory against Croatia in a video published to X on 18 June. Reflecting on the spike of domestic violence incidents that occurs during England games she said that "for the sake of women's safety", the squad needed to "keep winning". The comments drew criticism, from domestic abuse charities Refuge and Women's Aid, and from her political opponent, the equalities minister, Bridget Phillipson, for what they said was shifting the blame, for instances of abuse, onto football. Pochin rejected the criticism as "a leap too far, and twisting words", saying that she obviously did not mean that the responsibility for domestic abuse lay with the team, simply that family members of vulnerable women should be alert in the face of likely triggers.

In October 2026, Pochin and her husband bought a grade II listed building on Anglesey for £800,000 as a second home just two days after she had written to the housing minister Matthew Pennycook questioning the "impact of second-home ownership on housing availability in coastal and rural communities".

During undercover filming for the ITV documentary, Undercover: A Year in Reform, released in October 2026, Pochin accused her party's press officers of being chauvinistic.

== Personal life ==
She married businessman Jonathan Pochin in 1996 and has two sons. They own a house in Cheshire and a second home valued at £800,000 in Anglesey, Wales.

== Notes ==
Parliament of the United Kingdom
Preceded by Mike Amesbury	Member of Parliament for Runcorn and Helsby; 2025–present	Incumbent
