= Irene Ward =

British Conservative Party politician

The Right Honourable The Baroness Ward of North Tyneside CH DBE
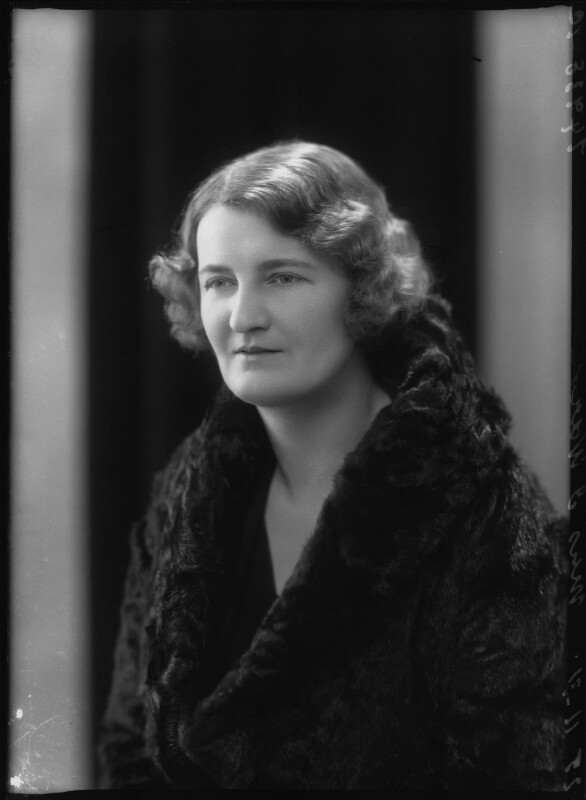
- Ward in 1931

Member of the House of Lords Lord Temporal
- In office 23 January 1975 – 26 April 1980; Life peerage

Member of Parliament for Tynemouth
- In office 23 February 1950 – 8 February 1974
- Preceded by: Grace Colman
- Succeeded by: Neville Trotter

Member of Parliament for Wallsend
- In office 27 October 1931 – 15 June 1945
- Preceded by: Margaret Bondfield
- Succeeded by: John McKay

Personal details
- Born: 23 February 1895
- Died: 26 April 1980 (aged 85)
- Party: Conservative

Irene Mary Bewick Ward, Baroness Ward of North Tyneside, CH, DBE (23 February 1895 – 26 April 1980) was a British Conservative Party politician. She was the Member of Parliament (MP) successively for Wallsend and for Tynemouth for over three decades, being the longest serving female Conservative MP in history. She later became a life peeress in the House of Lords, spending a total of 43 years in Parliament. She was an outspoken advocate of the rights of women and the elderly. She also advocated, with success, for the publication of an official history of the clandestine Special Operations Executive in the Second World War.

== Career ==
Ward was educated privately and at Newcastle Church High School. She contested Morpeth in 1924 and 1929 without success and was elected to the House of Commons in 1931 for Wallsend, defeating Labour's Margaret Bondfield. A strong advocate for Tyneside industry and social conditions, she lost her seat in the 1945 general election, which Labour won by a landslide.

In 1950, Ward returned to Parliament for Tynemouth, again defeating a female incumbent, Grace Colman. An active backbencher, she introduced the bill that became the Rights of Entry (Gas and Electricity Boards) Act, 1954. She promoted a Bill to pay pocket money to the elderly living in institutions. She also campaigned for Equal Pay for women in general, and for Florence 'Jean' Winder, the only woman reporter for Hansard, in particular. In 1954 she presented the cross-party 'Equal Pay in the public services' petition to Parliament on behalf of the Equal Pay Campaign Committee.

Ward worked with Charlotte Bentley who led the "National Association of State Enrolled Assistant Nurses". Her private member's bill passed through parliament to remove the demeaning word "assistant" from the State Enrolled Nurses's job title. This was the Nurses (Amendment) Act, 1961 and the following year there followed the Penalties for Drunkenness Act, 1962. She served on the Public Accounts Committee from 1964.

In the mid to late 1950s, Ward undertook a campaign to have the British government publish an official account of the work of the clandestine Special Operations Executive (SOE) during World War II. Ward was inspired to make the demand by a number of published, but unauthorized accounts of SOE, many of them critical of the British government and the SOE and describing the fate of female SOE agents who were captured and executed by Nazi Germany. Her interest was stimulated by books by Jean Overton Fuller and Elizabeth Nichols describing SOE disasters in France resulting in the death of SOE agents. Also, in writing a history of the First Aid Nursing Yeomanry (F.A.N.Y) she became aware that SOE records were inaccessible, even to a member of Parliament. Partly due to Ward's insistence, a reluctant British government authorized in 1960 an official history. Historian M.R.D. Foot was hired to write the history but without a guarantee it would be published. In 1962, Ward complained to Prime Minister Harold Macmillan that the publication of an official history was being blocked by a reluctant government. In 1964, in response to a question from Ward, the government announced that an official history would be published. In 1966, Foot's work, SOE in France, was finally published to acclaim from historians but also controversy and libel suits that cost the government tens of thousands of pounds.

Ward is remembered for being a fierce character in the House of Commons who was not shy of argument, openly expressing strong disagreements with ministers in her own party when she felt it necessary. She is remembered in some quarters for an incident which caused amusement on both sides of the House when she threatened to "poke" the then Labour Prime Minister Harold Wilson. Having received an evasive answer to a parliamentary question, she responded with the words: "I will poke the Prime Minister. I will poke him until I get a response." Another incident took place in 1968 when the Labour government, who then had a large majority, started passing large amounts of important legislation by making the House sit into the early hours of morning and making several bill committees sit simultaneously. During a division, Ward stood in front of the mace to prevent the tellers from giving the result on a finance bill. She furiously remarked to the Speaker that "Parliament is turning into a dictatorship, and I protest about it." Ward refused to relent and was escorted out the chamber by the serjeant-at-arms. She quipped: "Do you want my right or my left arm?"

Ward retired from the Commons in February 1974, having served a total of almost 38 years. She was the longest-serving female MP until that record was broken by Gwyneth Dunwoody in 2007. Aged 79 at her retirement, Ward was at that time also the oldest-ever serving female Member of Parliament and the oldest-ever woman to be re-elected, records not broken until Ann Clwyd achieved both in 2017.

Brian Harrison recorded an oral history interview with Ward, in July 1977, as part of the Suffrage Interviews project, titled Oral evidence on the suffragette and suffragist movements: the Brian Harrison interviews. In it she recalls her work with the Red Cross in the First World War, her early days in politics and her further Conservative career. Ward was chairwoman of the Committee on woman power investigating both the possibilities and problems of women’s war work between 1940 and 1945.

== Honours ==
She was created a life peer as Baroness Ward of North Tyneside, of North Tyneside in the County of Tyne and Wear, on 23 January 1975.

Ward was appointed a Commander of the Order of the British Empire (CBE) in 1929 and promoted to Dame Commander (DBE) in 1955, and was appointed a Member of the Order of the Companions of Honour in 1973.

== See also ==
- Women in the House of Commons of the United Kingdom

Parliament of the United Kingdom
Preceded by Margaret Bondfield	Member of Parliament for Wallsend; 1931–1945	Succeeded by John McKay
Preceded by Grace Colman	Member of Parliament for Tynemouth; 1950–1974	Succeeded by Neville Trotter
Honorary titles
Preceded by John Rankin	Oldest sitting member 1973 – 1974	Succeeded by David Weitzman
