= Richard Donkin =

Donkin in 1895.

Richard Sims Donkin (27 August 1836 – 5 February 1919) was an English shipowner and Conservative politician who sat in the House of Commons from 1885 to 1900.

Donkin was born in Tynemouth, the son of James Donkin of North Shields and his wife Ann Sims. He married Hannah Dryden in Christ Church, Tynemouth in 1864. He became a partner in Nelson, Donkin & Co steamship-owners of Newcastle on Tyne. He was a member of the committee of Lloyd's Register of Shipping and was a J.P. for Northumberland.

In the 1885 general election, Donkin was elected Member of Parliament (MP) for the newly created constituency of Tynemouth. He held the seat until he stood down at the 1900 general election.

Donkin lived at Albemarle, Wimbledon Common and died at the age of 82. The National Portrait Gallery has a photograph of him, which is available on-line.

Parliament of the United Kingdom
New constituency	Member of Parliament for Tynemouth; 1885 – 1900	Succeeded by Frederick Leverton Harris
