= Neville Trotter =

British politician (1932–2026)

Sir Neville Trotter JP DL FCA FRAeS FCIT

Member of Parliament for Tynemouth
- In office 28 February 1974 – 8 April 1997
- Preceded by: Irene Ward
- Succeeded by: Alan Campbell

Personal details
- Born: 27 January 1932 Blyth, Northumberland, England
- Died: 25 June 2026 (aged 94)
- Party: Conservative

Sir Neville Guthrie Trotter JP, DL, FCA, FRAeS, FCIT (27 January 1932 – 25 June 2026) was a British Conservative politician.

== Early life and career ==
Trotter was born in Blyth, Northumberland on 27 January 1932, the son of Captain Alexander Trotter and Elizabeth Winifred Trotter (née Guthrie). He was educated at Shrewsbury School and King's College, Durham (BCom).

Prior to becoming an MP, Trotter served as a Conservative councillor for Dene ward in Newcastle upon Tyne, which covered the northern areas of Heaton, parts of Benton and the well-known Freeman Hospital. Trotter was a member of Newcastle City Council from 1963 to 1974, and Tyne and Wear County Council from 1973 to 1974. In 1973, he was a Justice of the Peace in Newcastle.

== Parliamentary career ==
Trotter fought for the safe Labour seat of Consett in 1970, but came a distant second to the incumbent, David Watkins.

He was elected as MP for Tynemouth at the February 1974 general election until he retired at the 1997 election.

As an MP, he served on the Transport Committee from 9 June 1983 until his retirement in March 1997. He was also a member of the Expenditure Committee (1978-1979) and the Defence Committee (1992-1997).

Although his majorities were not huge, he successfully held on to Tynemouth, never being defeated at the polls. In 1992, the year after the Meadow Well Riots in the constituency, his majority was just under six hundred votes. After his retirement, Tynemouth was won by Labour's Alan Campbell. He is the most recent Conservative MP representing a constituency in Tyne and Wear.

== Outside parliament ==
Trotter was a consultant at Thornton Baker from 1974 to 1983, and at Grant Thornton, Chartered Accountants from 1983 to 2005.

== Personal life and death ==
In 1983, he married Caroline, daughter of the late Captain John Farrow, OBE, RN and Oona Farrow (née Hall). Trotter and his wife had a daughter.

Trotter's recreations were aviation, gardening, fell-walking, the study of foreign affairs, defence and industry. He was a member of the Royal Air Force and Northern Counties (Newcastle upon Tyne) clubs.

Trotter died on 25 June 2026, aged 94.

== Honours ==
Trotter was appointed a Knight Bachelor in John Major's Resignation Honours, 2 August 1997, the same year he became a deputy lieutenant. He became a Fellow of the Royal Aeronautical Society in 1998. Trotter was also a Fellow of the Institute of Chartered Accountants in England & Wales and the Chartered Institute of Transport. He was made a Freeman of the City of London in 1978. In April 2004, Trotter was appointed High Sheriff of Tyne and Wear.

== Sources ==
- Times Guide to the House of Commons, Times Newspapers Limited, 1992 and 1997 editions.

Parliament of the United Kingdom
Preceded by Irene Ward	Member of Parliament for Tynemouth; 1974–1997	Succeeded by Alan Campbell
