= Mike Amesbury =

British politician (born 1969)

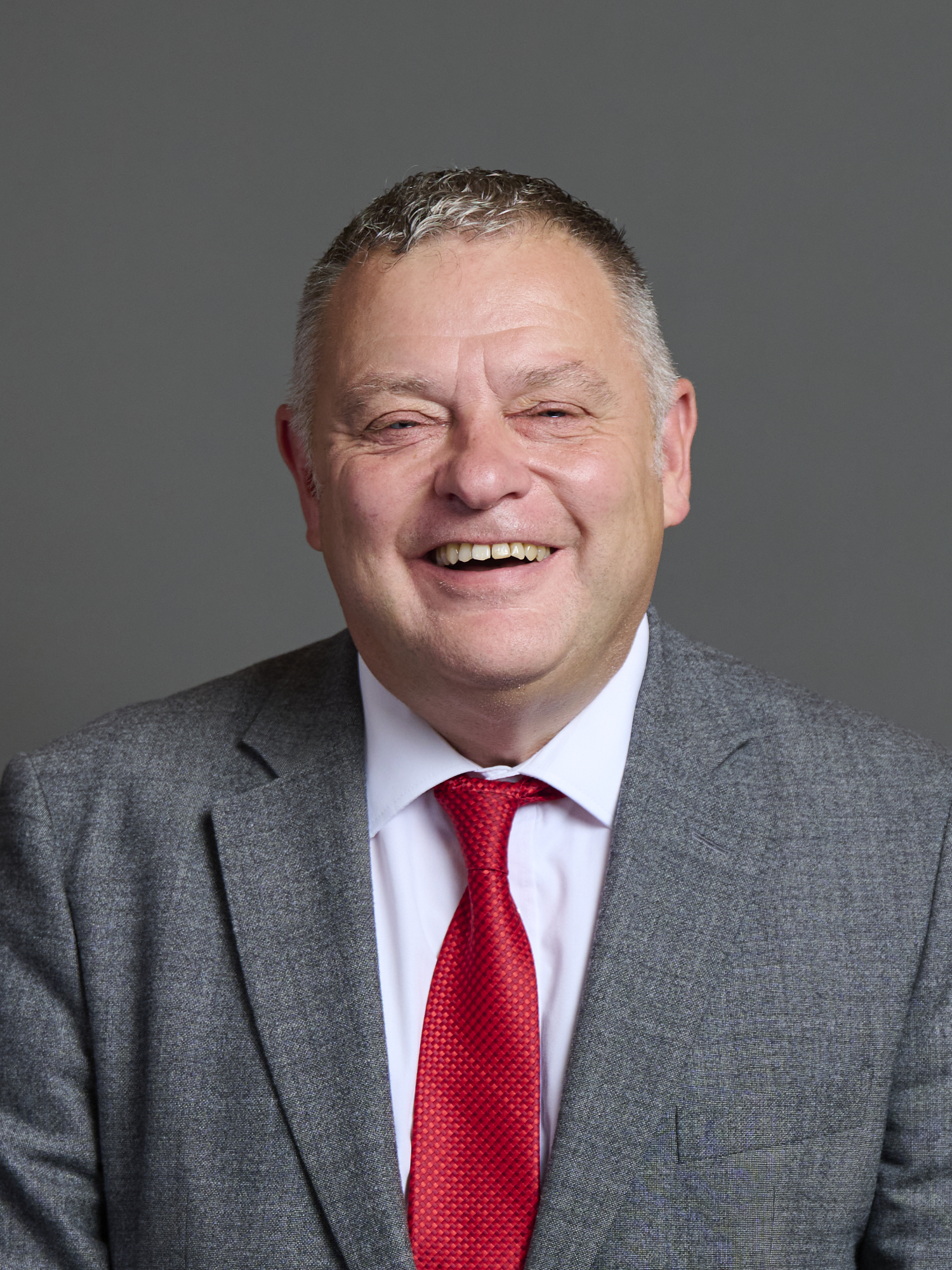
- Official portrait, 2024

Member of Parliament for Runcorn and Helsby Weaver Vale (2017–2024)
- In office 8 June 2017 – 17 March 2025
- Preceded by: Graham Evans
- Succeeded by: Sarah Pochin

Member of Manchester City Council for Fallowfield
- In office 4 May 2006 – 26 June 2017
- Preceded by: John-Paul Wilkins
- Succeeded by: Ali Ilyas

Personal details
- Born: Michael Lee Amesbury; 6 May 1969 (age 57) Wythenshawe, Cheshire, England
- Party: Independent (2025–present)
- Other political affiliations: Labour (1987–2025)
- Education: Ilkley College (BA); University of Central England (PGDip)
- Occupation: Politician; careers adviser

Michael Lee Amesbury (born 6 May 1969) is a British former politician who served as a Member of Parliament (MP) for Runcorn and Helsby (previously Weaver Vale) from 2017 until 2025. Formerly a member of the Labour Party, he was suspended in October 2024 and resigned his party membership in January 2025.

Born in Manchester and raised in West Yorkshire, Amesbury began working as a careers adviser and later became a Labour Party officer. He has been a political adviser to Greater Manchester politicians including Angela Rayner and Andy Burnham. Amesbury served as a Member of Manchester City Council from 2006 to 2017 and an Executive Member from 2008 to 2012. He held several shadow ministerial portfolios in Parliament between 2018 and 2024, including Employment, Housing, and Local Government.

In January 2025, Amesbury pleaded guilty to common assault and was sentenced to ten weeks in prison. On appeal, his prison sentence was upheld, but suspended for two years. In March 2025, he resigned from his seat in Parliament.

== Early life and education ==
Michael Lee Amesbury was born on 6 May 1969 in Wythenshawe, Manchester. He moved to Castleford in West Yorkshire at a young age, where he was educated at Castleford High School. He joined the Labour Party in 1987, having been politicised by the miners' strike.

Amesbury studied at Ilkley College, where he was awarded Bachelor of Arts degree in Community Studies from Bradford University in 1993. He was president of the Ilkley College students' union from 1993 to 1994, and founded its Labour Party society. In 1996, he received a Postgraduate Diploma in Careers Guidance from the University of Central England in Birmingham.

== Early career ==
Amesbury worked as a careers advisor in Birmingham after receiving his postgraduate degree. He became an officer for the North West Labour Party from 1999 until 2003, when returned to careers advice as a manager at Connexions.

He returned to North West Labour as an events and fundraising manager in 2013, having previously worked as a project manager at The Manchester College. He was a policy adviser at Tameside Council from 2014 until 2015, when he became an adviser to Tameside Member of Parliament (MP) Angela Rayner. He worked for Andy Burnham from 2016 to 2017, supporting his work as an MP and later his Greater Manchester mayoral campaign.

Amesbury was first elected to Manchester City Council in 2006, defeating the incumbent Liberal Democrat councillor in Fallowfield. He served as the Council's Executive Member for Culture and Leisure from 2008 to 2012. He was a member of Labour's National Policy Forum from 2010 to 2015. He resigned as a councillor following his election to Parliament in 2017.

== Parliamentary career ==
=== First term (2017–2019) ===
Amesbury was elected as Member of Parliament (MP) for Weaver Vale at the 2017 general election. He defeated the incumbent Conservative MP, Graham Evans, with 51.5% of the vote.

Amesbury has described his politics as "left of centre" and "pragmatic Labour". He supports electoral reform such as proportional representation, and voted to remain in the 2016 EU membership referendum.

From 2017 to 2018, Amesbury was a member of the Housing, Communities and Local Government Committee. He was appointed Parliamentary Private Secretary to the Shadow Work and Pensions Secretary, Debbie Abrahams, in January 2018. He was promoted to become Shadow Employment Minister in July 2018.

In 2019, Amesbury apologised "unreservedly" for having shared an antisemitic caricature on Facebook in 2013. He said that he did not recall sharing the post, but was "mortified" and would not have done so intentionally.

=== Second term (2019–2024) ===
At the 2019 general election, he was re-elected to represent Weaver Vale with a reduced majority of 562 votes over the Conservative candidate.

In February 2020, Amesbury introduced a private member's bill to reduce the cost of school uniforms; the bill was passed as the Education (Guidance about Costs of School Uniforms) Act 2021.

He was appointed Shadow Housing and Planning Minister in April 2020, which was reduced to Housing in May 2021. Amesbury became Shadow Local Government Minister in November 2021, but resigned in June 2022 to focus on his constituency work. He served on the Transport Committee from 2022 until 2023, when he rejoined the front bench as Shadow Building Safety and Homelessness Minister in September.

In July 2023, a 56-year-old man was convicted of stalking and harassing Amesbury; the offences took place from June to August 2022, and his sentence included a restraining order.

=== Third term (2024–2025) ===
Amesbury was elected to represent Runcorn and Helsby at the 2024 general election with a majority of almost 15,000. Weaver Vale had been abolished following boundary changes and replaced by his new constituency.

Following his election, Amesbury returned to the Housing, Communities and Local Government Committee and joined the Modernisation Committee.

In March 2025, following an assault conviction and imprisonment, Amesbury announced that he would resign as an MP at the earliest opportunity. On 17 March he was appointed Steward and Bailiff of the Chiltern Hundreds, a procedural appointment which caused him to vacate his parliamentary seat. Consequently, this triggered a by-election in the Runcorn and Helsby constituency which was won by Sarah Pochin of Reform UK.

== Assault conviction ==
At about 2:15 am on 26 October 2024, Amesbury was recorded by CCTV, in Frodsham, appearing to punch a man to the ground. Amesbury shouted: "You won't threaten the MP ever again, will you?" Cheshire Police stated that an assault had been reported and that no arrests had been made. The CCTV footage, subsequently released to the public, showed Amesbury directing more punches as the man lay prone on the ground. Bystanders intervened to restrain Amesbury.

Pending an investigation into the incident, the Labour Party administratively suspended Amesbury's party membership and parliamentary whip. Witnesses later said that the man had initially engaged Amesbury in a conversation about a local bridge which would be closed during winter, before the men's interactions became "heated". On 7 November 2024, Amesbury was charged with common assault and summoned to appear in court. On 16 January, he pleaded guilty and subsequently resigned from the Labour Party.

Appearing before the Deputy Chief Magistrate, Tan Ikram, on 24 February 2025 at Chester Magistrates' Court, Amesbury was sentenced to ten weeks imprisonment, and was sent to HMP Altcourse. He was due to serve 40 per cent of his sentence in prison, with the rest spent on licence. The custodial sentence would have triggered a recall petition under the Recall of MPs Act 2015, unless the sentence was sufficiently reduced to a non-custodial sentence, or he resigned. Public discussion arose regarding the fact that Amesbury would continue to be paid his MP's salary while in custody.

On 27 February at Chester Crown Court, Amesbury appealed against his sentence before His Honour Judge Steven Everett and two lay magistrates. The original sentence of ten weeks was upheld by the judge as being "spot on", but was suspended for two years. Amesbury was also ordered to attend 20 Rehabilitation Activity Requirement (RAR) days, principally surrounding anger management, with the judge noting that "[Amesbury] is not somebody who has complete control of [his] anger management issues". Amesbury was also ordered to carry out 200 hours of unpaid work, and submit to an Alcohol Monitoring Requirement for a period of 12 months. On 10 March Amesbury announced that he would step down from parliament "as soon as possible".

== Personal life ==
Amesbury is married and has a son.

He suffered from depression in the late 2000s, which resulted in behaviour of "self-destruction" and almost ended his marriage.

Amesbury is a supporter of Manchester United.

Parliament of the United Kingdom
Preceded by Graham Evans	Member of Parliament for Weaver Vale; 2017–2024	Constituency abolished
New constituency	Member of Parliament for Runcorn and Helsby; 2024–2025	Succeeded by Sarah Pochin
