= Weaver Vale =

UK Parliament constituency (1997–2024)

Coordinates: 53.260°N 2.531°W

- Former county constituency for the House of Commons
- Boundary of Weaver Vale in Cheshire

- Location of Cheshire within England
- County: Cheshire
- Electorate: 70,129 (2018)
- Major settlements: Northwich, Runcorn and Frodsham

1997–2024
- Seats: One
- Created from: Eddisbury, Tatton, Halton, and Warrington South
- Replaced by: Runcorn and Helsby, Mid Cheshire, Chester South and Eddisbury, and Tatton

Weaver Vale was a constituency (Note: A county constituency (for the purposes of election expenses and type of returning officer).) in Cheshire represented in the House of Commons of the UK Parliament from 1997 to 2024. (Note: As with all constituencies, the constituency elects one Member of Parliament (MP) by the first past the post system of election at least every five years.)

Further to the completion of the 2023 Periodic Review of Westminster constituencies, the seat was abolished at the 2024 general election. Just over half the seat became part of the new Runcorn and Helsby seat, with other areas moved to the new constituencies of Mid Cheshire and Chester South and Eddisbury, and a very small part joined the existing constituency of Tatton.

== Constituency profile ==
The constituency took its name from the River Weaver, which flows through the area, and much of the area was part of the former district of Vale Royal. The constituency covered the northern part of the Cheshire West and Chester unitary authority in Cheshire, including the towns of Northwich and Frodsham and the villages of Helsby and Weaverham. It also included part of the Borough of Halton, covering the eastern half of Runcorn.

The area has economic sectors as diverse as plastics and chemicals to construction. Other areas include telecommunications/bank communication centres, with in addition, a large national bakery and a supermarket distribution centre. Salt used to comprise a major mining industry of the area, much more of which is extracted today from large reserves in Northern Ireland. Workless claimants who were registered jobseekers were in November 2012 slightly higher than the national average of 3.8%, at 4.1% of the population based on a statistical compilation by The Guardian. This was, however, lower than the regional average of 4.4%. Northwich and the wards from Halton are inclined to vote Labour, whereas Frodsham, Helsby and the smaller rural villages are more Conservative.

== Creation ==
Weaver Vale was created for the 1997 general election from parts of Eddisbury, Tatton, Halton, and Warrington South, when the number of constituencies in Cheshire was increased from 10 to 11.

== Boundaries ==
Map of boundaries 2019-2024

1997–2010: The District of Vale Royal wards of Castle, Church, Forest, Frodsham East, Frodsham North West, Frodsham South, Gorst Wood, Hartford, Helsby Central, Helsby North, Helsby South and Alvanley Ward, Kingsley, Milton, Northwich, Weaver, Winnington, Witton North, and Witton South, and the Borough of Halton wards of Brookfields, Castlefields, Clough, Daresbury, Murdishaw, and Norton.

Norton and Daresbury were transferred from Warrington South, with other parts of Halton coming from the constituency thereof. Frodsham, Helsby and Weaverham were transferred from Eddisbury and Northwich had previously been part of Tatton.

2010–2019: The Parliamentary Constituencies (England) Order 2007 defined the boundaries as:

The Borough of Halton wards of Beechwood, Daresbury, Halton Lea, Norton North, Norton South, and Windmill Hill, and the Borough of Vale Royal wards of Forest, Frodsham North, Frodsham South, Hartford & Whitegate, Helsby, Kingsley, Leftwich & Kingsmead, Milton Weaver, Northwich Castle, Northwich Winnington, Northwich Witton, and Weaverham.

Halton Borough ward of Castlefields transferred to Halton constituency. Other minor changes due to revision of ward boundaries.

However, before the new boundaries came into force for the 2010 election, the districts making up the county of Cheshire were abolished on 1 April 2009, being replaced by four unitary authorities. Consequently, the constituency's boundaries became:

The Cheshire West and Chester wards of Davenham & Moulton (part), Frodsham, Gowy (part), Hartford & Greenbank, Helsby, Kingsley, Weaver & Cuddington (part), Winsford Over & Verdin (part), Winnington & Castle, and Witton & Rudheath (part), and the Borough of Halton wards of Beechwood, Daresbury, Halton Lea, Norton North, Norton South, and Windmill Hill.

2019–2024: Following a further local government ward boundary review in 2019, the boundaries were:

The Cheshire West and Chester wards of Davenham, Moulton & Kingsmead (part), Frodsham, Hartford & Greenbank, Helsby, Marbury (part), Northwich Leftwich, Northwich Winnington & Castle, Northwich Witton, Rudheath (part), Sandstone (part), Weaver & Cuddington (part), and Winsford Over & Verdin (part), and the Borough of Halton wards of Beechwood, Daresbury, Halton Lea, Norton North, Norton South, and Windmill Hill.

== Abolition ==
Further to the completion of the 2023 Periodic Review of Westminster constituencies, the seat was abolished prior to the 2024 general election, with its contents distributed to three new constituencies and one existing one:

- Helsby, Frodsham and the parts in the Borough of Halton (just over half the electorate) to Runcorn and Helsby
- Northwich to Mid Cheshire
- Weaverham to Chester South and Eddisbury
- The part in Cheshire West and Chester north of the River Weaver to Tatton

== Political history ==
From the 1997 general election, the new seat was held by the Labour Party's Mike Hall, who had first entered Parliament in 1992 for Warrington South. Labour held the seat relatively easily in the succeeding two general elections. In February 2010 Hall announced that he was standing down at the 2010 election for health reasons. Graham Evans (Conservative) gained the seat at the 2010 election on a swing of 8.15% with minor boundary changes mentioned as likely affecting this swing.

Mike Amesbury regained the seat for Labour at the 2017 general election and was returned again, with a reduced majority, in 2019.

Weaver Vale was one of seven seats won (held or gained) by a Labour candidate in 2017 from a total of 11 covering its county. Amesbury's 2017 win was one of 30 net gains of the Labour Party, three of which came from the county of Cheshire.

The seat was considered a marginal seat from 2010 onwards, as its winner's majority did not exceed 7.8% of the vote in any of the four elections held from then onwards, and it changed hands twice in that time.

== Members of Parliament ==
Election	Member	Party
1997	Mike Hall	Labour
2010	Graham Evans	Conservative
2017	Mike Amesbury	Labour

== Elections ==
=== Elections in the 2010s ===
General election 2019: Weaver Vale
Party	Candidate	Votes	%	±%
Labour	Mike Amesbury	22,772	44.9	―6.6
Conservative	Adam Wordsworth	22,210	43.8	+0.1
Liberal Democrats	Daniela Parker	3,300	6.5	+3.3
Brexit Party	Nicholas Goulding	1,380	2.7	New
Green	Paul Bowers	1,051	2.1	+0.5
Majority		562	1.1	―6.7
Turnout		50,713	71.9	―1.4
Labour hold		Swing		

General election 2017: Weaver Vale
Party	Candidate	Votes	%	±%
Labour	Mike Amesbury	26,066	51.5	+10.1
Conservative	Graham Evans	22,138	43.7	+0.5
Liberal Democrats	Paul Roberts	1,623	3.2	+0.2
Green	Chris Copeman	786	1.6	―0.9
Majority		3,928	7.8	N/A
Turnout		50,613	73.3	+4.8
Labour gain from Conservative		Swing	+4.25	

General election 2015: Weaver Vale
Party	Candidate	Votes	%	±%
Conservative	Graham Evans	20,227	43.2	+4.7
Labour	Julia Tickridge	19,421	41.4	+5.1
UKIP	Amos Wright	4,547	9.7	+7.4
Liberal Democrats	Mary Di Mauro	1,395	3.0	―15.6
Green	Chris Copeman	1,183	2.5	+1.7
TUSC	Joseph Whyte	94	0.2	New
Majority		806	1.8	―0.4
Turnout		46,867	68.5	+2.4
Conservative hold		Swing		

General election 2010: Weaver Vale
Party	Candidate	Votes	%	±%
Conservative	Graham Evans	16,953	38.5	+6.9
Labour	John Stockton	15,962	36.3	―9.4
Liberal Democrats	Peter Hampson	8,196	18.6	―1.1
BNP	Colin Marsh	1,063	2.4	New
UKIP	Paul Remfry	1,018	2.3	―0.5
Green	Howard Thorp	338	0.8	New
Independent	Mike Cooksley	270	0.6	New
Independent	Tom Reynolds	133	0.3	New
Independent	Will Charlton	57	0.1	New
Majority		991	2.2	N/A
Turnout		43,990	66.1	+10.5
Conservative gain from Labour		Swing	+8.15	

=== Elections in the 2000s ===
General election 2005: Weaver Vale
Party	Candidate	Votes	%	±%
Labour	Mike Hall	18,759	47.6	―4.9
Conservative	Jonathan Mackie	11,904	30.2	+2.3
Liberal Democrats	Trevor Griffiths	7,723	19.6	+5.2
UKIP	Brenda Swinscoe	1,034	2.6	+1.2
Majority		6,855	17.4	―7.2
Turnout		39,420	57.1	―0.5
Labour hold		Swing		

General election 2001: Weaver Vale
Party	Candidate	Votes	%	±%
Labour	Mike Hall	20,611	52.5	―3.9
Conservative	Carl Cross	10,974	27.9	―0.7
Liberal Democrats	Trevor Griffiths	5,643	14.4	+2.1
Independent	Mike Cooksley	1,484	3.8	New
UKIP	Jim Bradshaw	559	1.4	New
Majority		9,637	24.6	―3.2
Turnout		39,271	57.6	―15.4
Labour hold		Swing		

=== Elections in the 1990s ===
General election 1997: Weaver Vale
Party	Candidate	Votes	%	±%
Labour	Mike Hall	27,244	56.4	
Conservative	James Byrne	13,796	28.6	
Liberal Democrats	Trevor Griffiths	5,949	12.3	
Referendum	Roger Cockfield	1,312	2.7	
Majority		13,448	27.8	
Turnout		48,301	73.0	
Labour win (new seat)				

== See also ==
- List of parliamentary constituencies in Cheshire
- History of parliamentary constituencies and boundaries in Cheshire
