= Alexander Russell (politician) =

British politician (1879–1961)

Sir Alexander Russell
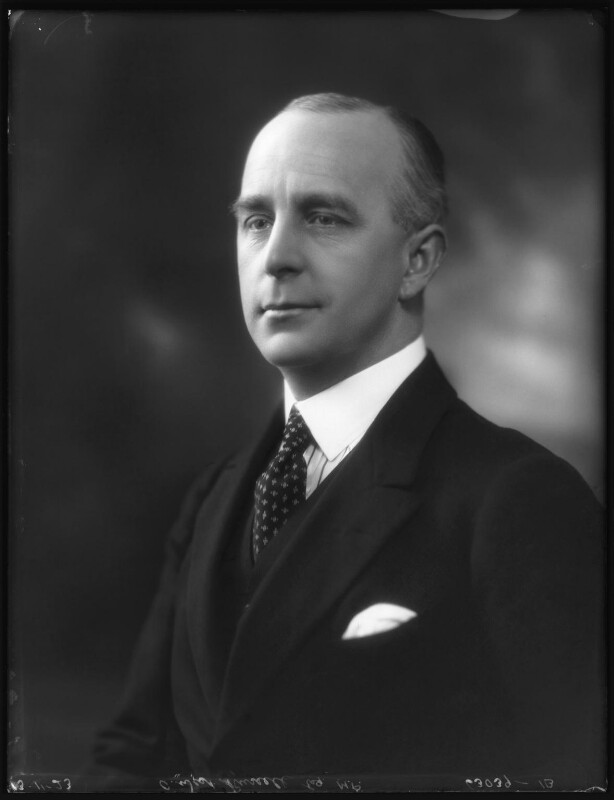
- Russell in 1923
- Born: Alexander West Russell; 1879
- Died: 1961 (aged 81–82)
- Occupation: Politician

Sir Alexander West Russell (1879–1961) was Conservative MP for Tynemouth from 1922 to 1945.

Parliament of the United Kingdom
Preceded by Charles Percy	Member of Parliament for Tynemouth; 1922 – 1945	Succeeded by Grace Colman
