= Runcorn and Helsby =

UK Parliament constituency (since 2024)

- County constituency for the House of Commons
- Interactive map of boundaries since 2024
- Location within North West England
- County: Cheshire
- Electorate: 70,950 (March 2020)
- Major settlements: Runcorn, Frodsham and Helsby

Current constituency
- Created: 2024
- Member of Parliament: Sarah Pochin (Reform UK)
- Seats: One
- Created from: Weaver Vale, Halton, City of Chester and Ellesmere Port and Neston and Eddisbury

Runcorn and Helsby is a constituency in Cheshire represented in the House of Commons of the UK Parliament. Further to the completion of the 2023 review of Westminster constituencies, it was first contested at the 2024 general election.

The incumbent MP is Sarah Pochin of Reform UK. Following the resignation of Labour MP Mike Amesburyin March 2025, she defeated Labour candidate Karen Shore by six votes at a by-election on 1 May 2025, overturning a 34.8% majority.

Amesbury had previously been the MP for the predecessor constituency of Weaver Vale from 2017 to 2024, having elected a Conservative MP from 2010 to 2017.

== Constituency profile ==
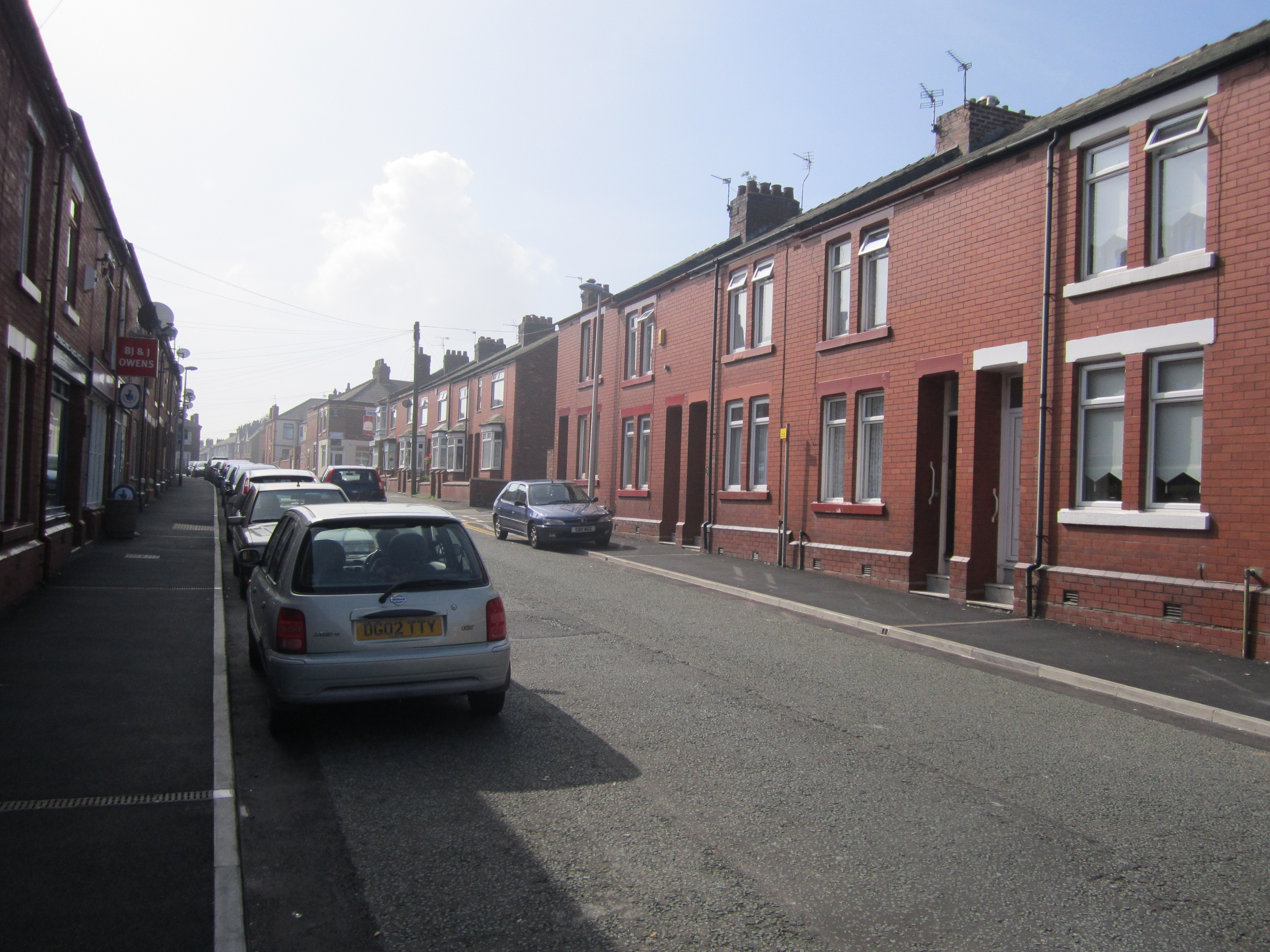
Balfour Street, Runcorn

Runcorn and Helsby is a constituency in Cheshire in North West England, covering parts of the Halton and Cheshire West and Chester districts. Its main settlement is the town of Runcorn, which has a population of around 63,000. The constituency also covers a rural area to the south-west of Runcorn which includes the town of Frodsham and the villages of Helsby and Elton.

Runcorn is a port town located around 11 miles (18 km) south-east of Liverpool. The town was a small, rural settlement until the arrival of canals in the industrial era, which transformed it into a centre for the shipbuilding and chemical industries. Runcorn was designated a new town in 1964 to accommodate overspill from Liverpool; the new suburban development would more than double the town's population. These neighbourhoods, which make up the eastern half of Runcorn, are highly-deprived with a large quantity of dense, terraced council housing. The constituency's rural areas are generally affluent, especially so around the small market town of Frodsham and in the villages close to Chester. House prices across the constituency are similar to the rest of North West England and lower than the UK average.

Runcorn and Helsby has an above-average proportion of retirees and a low young adult population. Residents have average levels of income, homeownership, child poverty and education. A high proportion work in the health and manufacturing sectors and the percentage claiming unemployment benefits is similar to the UK-wide rate. White people made up 97% of the population at the 2021 census.

Most of the constituency is represented by the Labour Party at the local council level. Some Conservatives were elected in the rural villages and Reform UK councillors won seats across Runcorn at the most recent election in 2026. An estimated 54% of voters in Runcorn and Helsby supported leaving the European Union in the 2016 referendum, marginally higher than the UK-wide figure of 52%.

== Boundaries ==
Further to the 2023 boundary review, the composition of the constituency is as follows from the 2024 general election (as they existed on 1 December 2020):

- The Borough of Cheshire West and Chester wards of: Frodsham; Gowy Rural; Helsby; Sandstone.
- The Borough of Halton wards of: Beechwood & Heath; Bridgewater; Daresbury, Moore & Sandymoor; Grange; Halton Castle; Halton Lea; Mersey & Weston; Norton North; Norton South & Preston Brook.

The seat comprises the following areas:

- Helsby, Frodsham and parts of the Borough of Halton previously in the former constituency of Weaver Vale, comprising about half the electorate
- The town of Runcorn, transferred from the former constituency of Halton
- The Gowy Rural and Sandstone wards – including the village of Elton, transferred from the former constituency of Ellesmere Port and Neston; Guilden Sutton from the former constituency of City of Chester; and Dunham-on-the-Hill and other small villages from the former constituency of Eddisbury.

== Members of Parliament ==
Election	Member	Party	Notes
2024	Mike Amesbury	Labour	
Oct 2024	Mike Amesbury	Independent	Whip suspended in October 2024
2025 by-election	Sarah Pochin	Reform UK	

== Elections ==
=== Elections in the 2020s ===
2025 Runcorn and Helsby by-election
Party	Candidate	Votes	%	±%
Reform	Sarah Pochin	12,645	38.72	+20.58
Labour	Karen Shore	12,639	38.70	−14.23
Conservative	Sean Houlston	2,341	7.17	−8.83
Green	Chris Copeman	2,314	7.09	+0.66
Liberal Democrats	Paul Duffy	942	2.88	−2.2
Liberal	Dan Clarke	454	1.39	+0.26
Independent	Michael Williams	363	1.11	New
Independent	Alan McKie	269	0.82	New
Workers Party	Peter Ford	164	0.50	New
Rejoin EU	John Stevens	129	0.40	New
Monster Raving Loony	Howling Laud Hope	128	0.39	New
English Democrat	Catherine Blaiklock	95	0.29	New
SDP	Paul Andrew Murphy	68	0.21	−0.07
Volt	Jason Philip Hughes	54	0.17	New
English Constitution Party	Graham Harry Moore	50	0.15	New
Rejected ballots		85		
Majority		6	0.02	N/A
Turnout		32,655	46.2	−12.5
Reform gain from Labour		Swing	+17.4	

General election 2024: Runcorn and Helsby
Party	Candidate	Votes	%	±%
Labour	Mike Amesbury	22,358	52.9	+4.1
Reform	Jason Moorcroft	7,662	18.1	+13.3
Conservative	Jade Marsden	6,756	16.0	−20.8
Green	Chris Copeman	2,715	6.4	+3.5
Liberal Democrats	Chris Rowe	2,149	5.1	−1.6
Liberal	Danny Clarke	479	1.1	New
SDP	Paul Murphy	116	0.3	New
Rejected ballots		171		
Majority		14,696	34.8	+22.9
Turnout		42,235	59.7	−9.5
Registered electors		70,801		
Labour hold		Swing	−4.6	

Changes are from the notional results of the 2019 election on the new boundaries.

=== Elections in the 2010s ===
2019 notional result
Party	Vote	%
Labour	23,617	48.8
Conservative	17,838	36.8
Liberal Democrats	3,247	6.7
Brexit Party	2,302	4.8
Green	1,414	2.9
Turnout	48,418	68.2
Electorate	70,950	
