= Tynemouth (constituency) =

Parliamentary constituency in the United Kingdom, 1885 onwards

Coordinates: 55.03°N 1.46°W

- Borough constituency for the House of Commons
- Interactive map of boundaries since 2024
- Location within North East England
- County: Tyne and Wear
- Electorate: 73,022 (March 2020)
- Major settlements: North Shields, Whitley Bay, Monkseaton, Tynemouth and Cullercoats

Current constituency
- Created: 1832
- Member of Parliament: Alan Campbell (Labour)
- Seats: One
- Created from: Northumberland

Tynemouth is a constituency (Note: A borough constituency (for the purposes of election expenses and type of returning officer)) in Tyne and Wear represented in the House of Commons of the UK Parliament since 1997 by Sir Alan Campbell, a member of the Labour Party. (Note: As with all constituencies, the constituency elects one Member of Parliament (MP) by the first past the post system of election at least every five years.)

== Constituency profile ==
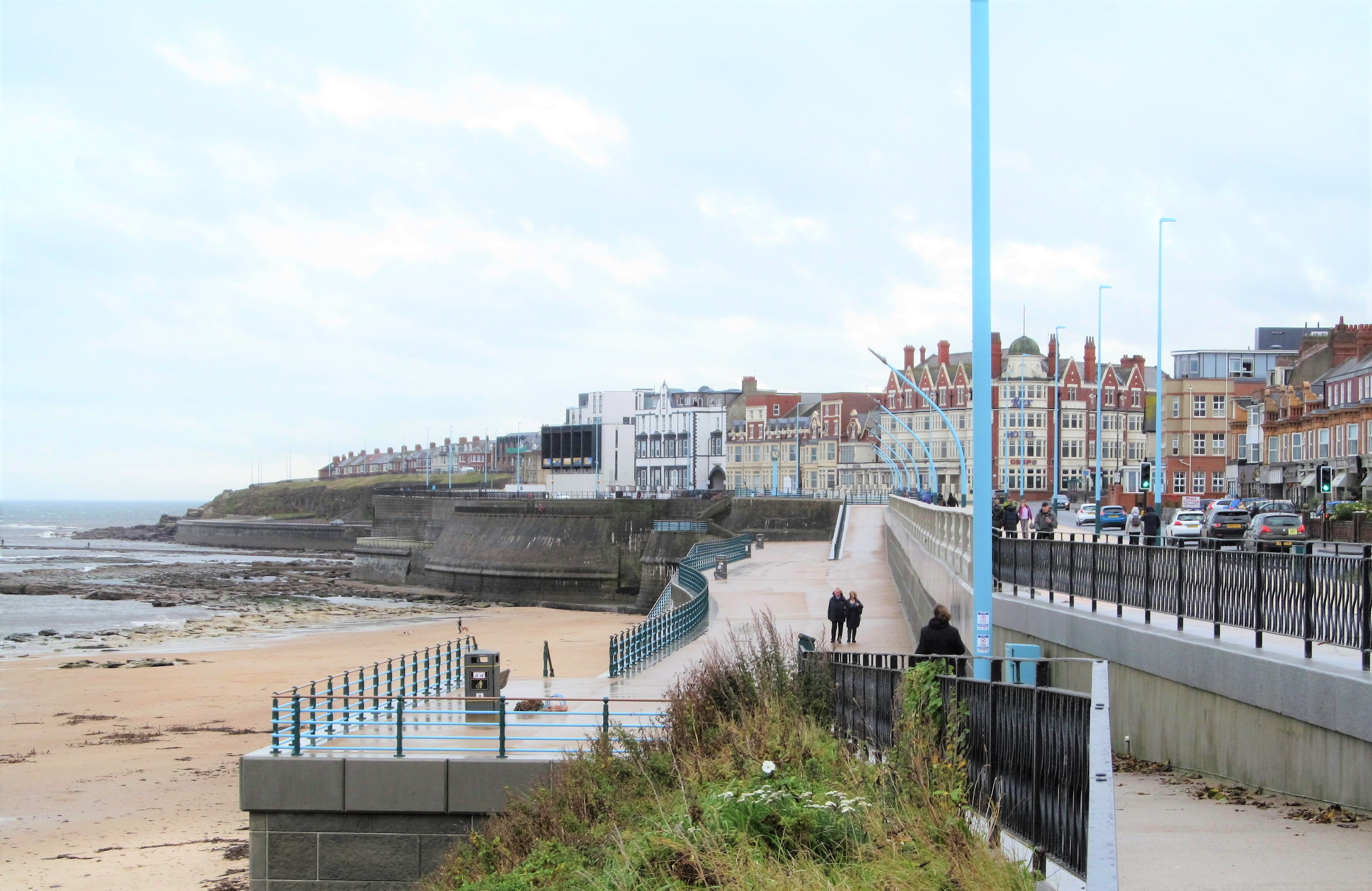
Whitley Bay

Tynemouth is a constituency in Tyne and Wear in North East England, within the borough of North Tyneside. It includes the towns of Tynemouth, North Shields and Whitley Bay.

This constituency covers three connected towns that form part of the Tyneside built-up area, located around 7 miles (11 km) north-east of Newcastle upon Tyne. North Shields is a former industrial town with a history of shipbuilding and coal mining. Today the town is highly-deprived with most residents living in dense terraces or flats. Tynemouth and Whitley Bay are coastal towns and are popular with tourists for their beaches. They are wealthier than North Shields; many of the suburban neighbourhoods in this area are highly affluent and serve as residences for commuters into Newcastle. House prices across the constituency are generally higher than the rest of North East England but lower than the UK average.

The Tynemouth constituency has a low proportion of young adults and a large retired population. Residents have average rates of income, above-average levels of homeownership, and the child poverty rate is low. They have average levels of education and a high proportion work in the health, retail and business administration sectors. White people made up 95% of the population at the 2021 census.

At the local borough council, most of this constituency is represented by the Labour Party with some Conservative councillors elected in the wealthy suburbs. An estimated 52% of voters in the Tynemouth constituency supported remaining in the European Union in the 2016 referendum, higher than the UK-wide figure of 48%.

== Creation ==
Tynemouth was one of 20 new single-member parliamentary boroughs created by the Reform Act 1832. However, under the Parliamentary Boundaries Act 1832, it is referred to as Tynemouth and North Shields. The constituency is referred to in various sources (e.g. Leigh Rayment and F.W.S.Craig) by the latter name between 1832 and 1885 and then treated as abolished and replaced by Tynemouth from 1885 onwards. However, there is no mention of this in the Redistribution of Seats Act 1885 and the boundaries were unchanged at that time. The current name of Tynemouth has officially been in use since the Representation of the People Act 1918. It therefore appears that both names were used for the same constituency at different times from 1832 to 1918.

== Boundaries ==
=== Historic ===
==== 1832-1918 ====
- Under the Parliamentary Boundaries Act 1832, the contents of Tynemouth and North Shields were defined as: The several Townships of Tynemouth, North Shields, Chirton, Preston and Cullercoats.

==== 1918–1950 ====
- The County Borough of Tynemouth.

No change to the boundaries.

==== 1950–1983 ====
- The County Borough of Tynemouth; and
- The Urban District of Whitley Bay.

Whitley Bay, which became a municipal borough in 1954, was transferred from the abolished constituency of Wansbeck.

==== 1983–1997 ====
- The Borough of North Tyneside wards of Chirton, Collingwood, Cullercoats, Monkseaton, North Shields, Riverside, St Mary's, Seatonville, Tynemouth, Whitley Bay.

Minor changes to take account of changes to local authority and ward boundaries following the reorganisation under the Local Government Act 1972.

==== 1997–2010 ====
- The Borough of North Tyneside wards of Chirton, Collingwood, Cullercoats, Monkseaton, North Shields, St Mary's, Seatonville, Tynemouth, Whitley Bay.

Map of 2010–2024 boundaries

Riverside ward transferred to the new constituency of North Tyneside.

==== 2010–2024 ====
- The Borough of North Tyneside wards of Chirton, Collingwood, Cullercoats, Monkseaton North, Monkseaton South, Preston, St Mary's, Tynemouth, Valley, Whitley Bay.

Valley ward transferred from North Tyneside.

=== Current ===
Under the 2023 review of Westminster constituencies, which came into effect for the 2024 general election, the constituency was defined as being composed of the following (as they existed on 1 December 2020):

- The Borough of North Tyneside wards of Chirton, Collingwood, Cullercoats, Monkseaton North, Monkseaton South, Preston, Riverside (majority, comprising polling districts FC, FD, FE, FF, FG, and FH), St. Mary's, Tynemouth, and Whitley Bay.

The Valley ward was moved back out, to the new constituency of Cramlington and Killingworth, partly offset by the reinstatement of most of Riverside ward from North Tyneside (abolished).

Further to a local government boundary review which became effective in May 2024, the constituency now comprises the following with effect from the 2024 general election:

- The Borough of North Tyneside wards of: Chirton & Percy Main; Cullercoats & Whitley Bay South; Monkseaton; New York & Murton; North Shields; Preston with Preston Grange; St. Mary's; Tynemouth; Whitley Bay North.

== Political history ==
The seat had historically tended to be one of the more Conservative-leaning seats in the North East of England, where the party has traditionally struggled against the Labour Party. As a relatively middle-class area, it returned Conservative MPs from 1950 to 1997, albeit often on narrow majorities. It has been represented by Labour since 1997, though the Conservatives remain strong at a local level. Similar to Sefton Central on Merseyside, despite being a traditionally strong Conservative area in a Labour-dominated county, the area has swung significantly to Labour during the twenty-first century, and has been won by semi-marginal to safe margins by Labour candidates at every general election since 1997, with significant swings to Labour seen in 2015, 2017 and 2024.

Since the 1997 general election, it has been represented by Alan Campbell of the Labour Party, who reached the level of government below a Minister of State in 2008, as a Parliamentary Under-Secretary of State for the Home Office. He is currently Leader of the House of Commons.

== Members of Parliament ==
- Constituency created (1885)

Election	Member	Party
1885	Richard Donkin	Conservative
1900	Frederick Leverton Harris	Conservative
1906	Herbert James Craig	Liberal
1918	Charles Percy	Conservative
1922	Alexander Russell	Conservative
1945	Grace Colman	Labour
1950	Irene Ward	Conservative
Feb 1974	Neville Trotter	Conservative
1997	Alan Campbell	Labour

== Elections ==
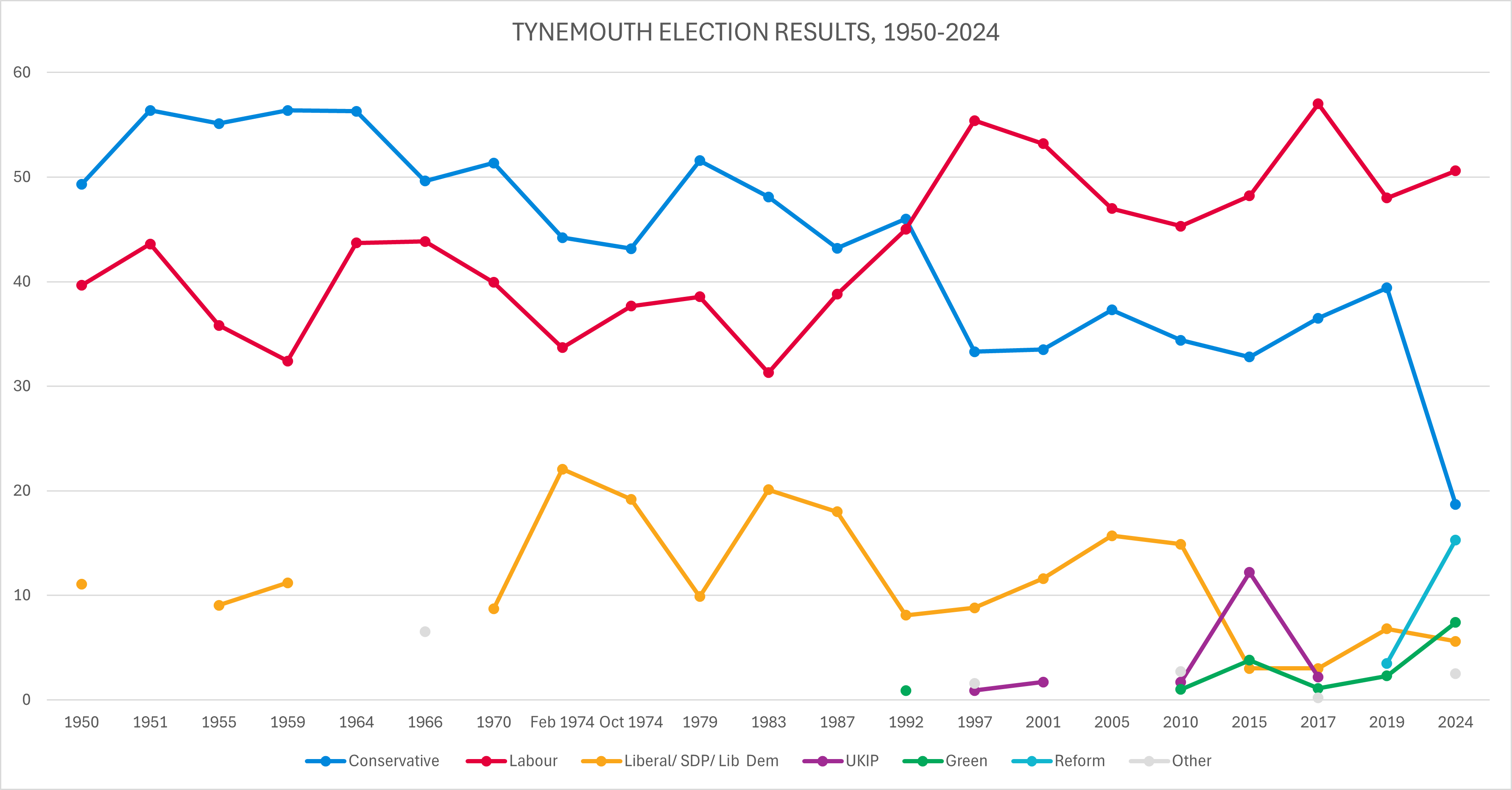
Election results 1950-2024

=== Elections in the 2020s ===
General election 2024: Tynemouth
Party	Candidate	Votes	%	±%
Labour	Alan Campbell	24,491	50.6	+3.9
Conservative	Lewis Bartoli	9,036	18.7	−21.5
Reform	Rosalyn Elliot	7,392	15.3	+11.4
Green	Chloe-Louise Fawcett-Reilly	3,592	7.4	+5.1
Liberal Democrats	John Appleby	2,709	5.6	−1.1
Independent	Mustaque Rahman	531	1.1	N/A
Party of Women	Kelly Dougall	286	0.6	N/A
Independent	Christopher Greener	273	0.6	N/A
Heritage	Adam Thewlis	108	0.2	N/A
Majority		15,455	31.9	+23.3
Turnout		48,418	65.9	−8.0
Labour hold		Swing	+12.7	

=== Elections in the 2010s ===
General election 2019: Tynemouth
Party	Candidate	Votes	%	±%
Labour	Alan Campbell	26,928	48.0	▼9.0
Conservative	Lewis Bartoli	22,071	39.4	▲2.9
Liberal Democrats	John Appleby	3,791	6.8	▲3.0
Brexit Party	Ed Punchard	1,963	3.5	New
Green	Julia Erskine	1,281	2.3	▲1.2
Majority		4,857	8.6	▼12.9
Turnout		56,034	72.5	▼2.0
Labour hold		Swing	▼5.9	

General election 2017: Tynemouth
Party	Candidate	Votes	%	±%
Labour	Alan Campbell	32,395	57.0	▲8.8
Conservative	Nick Varley	20,729	36.5	▲3.7
Liberal Democrats	John Appleby	1,724	3.0	Steady
UKIP	Stuart Haughton	1,257	2.2	▼10.0
Green	Julia Erskine	629	1.1	▼2.7
Independent	Anthony "The Durham Cobbler" Jull	124	0.2	New
Majority		11,666	20.5	▲4.1
Turnout		56,858	74.5	▲5.5
Labour hold		Swing	▲2.6	

General election 2015: Tynemouth
Party	Candidate	Votes	%	±%
Labour	Alan Campbell	25,791	48.2	▲2.9
Conservative	Glenn Hall	17,551	32.8	▼1.6
UKIP	Gary Legg	6,541	12.2	▲10.5
Green	Julia Erskine	2,017	3.8	▲2.8
Liberal Democrats	John Paton-Day	1,595	3.0	▼11.9
Majority		8,240	15.4	▲4.5
Turnout		53,495	69.0	▼0.6
Labour hold		Swing	▲2.3	

For the 2010 election, this was the primary target seat for the Conservatives in North East England following impressive local council victories since 2006 and the recent marginality of Alan Campbell's 2005 re-election.

General election 2010: Tynemouth
Party	Candidate	Votes	%	±%
Labour	Alan Campbell	23,860	45.3	▼3.0
Conservative	Wendy Morton	18,121	34.4	▼2.2
Liberal Democrats	John Appleby	7,845	14.9	▼0.2
BNP	Dorothy Brooke	1,404	2.7	New
UKIP	Natasha Payne	900	1.7	New
Green	Julia Erskine	538	1.0	New
Majority		5,739	10.9	▲1.2
Turnout		52,668	69.6	▲3.6
Labour hold		Swing	▼0.4	

=== Elections in the 2000s ===
Michael McIntyre was councillor for the Whitley Bay Ward at the time of polling. The Conservatives hoped to snatch the seat, but could only diminish Alan Campbell's majority. In the Mayoral election held on the same day, Mayor Linda Arkley (Conservative) narrowly lost re-election.

General election 2005: Tynemouth
Party	Candidate	Votes	%	±%
Labour	Alan Campbell	20,143	47.0	▼6.2
Conservative	Michael McIntyre	16,000	37.3	▲3.8
Liberal Democrats	Colin Finlay	6,716	15.7	▲4.1
Majority		4,143	9.7	▼10.0
Turnout		42,859	66.9	▼0.5
Labour hold		Swing	▼5.0	

Labour MP Alan Campbell was returned in 2001 with a smaller majority during Tony Blair's second landslide.

General election 2001: Tynemouth
Party	Candidate	Votes	%	±%
Labour	Alan Campbell	23,364	53.2	▼2.2
Conservative	Karl Poulsen	14,686	33.5	▲0.2
Liberal Democrats	Penny Reid	5,108	11.6	▲2.8
UKIP	Michael Rollings	745	1.7	▲0.8
Majority		8,678	19.7	▼2.4
Turnout		43,903	67.4	▼9.7
Labour hold		Swing	-1.2	

=== Elections in the 1990s ===
In 1997 Labour won the seat for the first time since 1945. The Conservatives chose Gateshead Councillor Martin Callanan as their candidate to replace the retiring Neville Trotter. He would subsequently become a North East MEP and later a peer and government minister.

General election 1997: Tynemouth
Party	Candidate	Votes	%	±%
Labour	Alan Campbell	28,318	55.4	▲10.4
Conservative	Martin Callanan	17,045	33.3	▼12.7
Liberal Democrats	Andrew Duffield	4,509	8.8	▲0.7
Referendum	Clive Rook	819	1.6	New
UKIP	Frank Rogers	462	0.9	New
Majority		11,273	22.1	N/A
Turnout		51,153	77.11	▼3.3
Labour gain from Conservative		Swing	▲11.5	

In 1992 Neville Trotter narrowly won his final term as the Labour candidate's fourth attempt failed. Many council seats were also unexpectedly won on the back of John Major's victory such as Whitley Bay and Monkseaton.

General election 1992: Tynemouth
Party	Candidate	Votes	%	±%
Conservative	Neville Trotter	27,731	46.0	▲2.8
Labour	Patrick Cosgrove	27,134	45.0	▲6.2
Liberal Democrats	Philip Selby	4,855	8.1	▼9.9
Green	Andrew Buchanan-Smith	543	0.9	New
Majority		597	1.0	▼3.4
Turnout		60,263	80.4	▲2.3
Conservative hold		Swing	▼1.7	

=== Elections in the 1980s ===
General election 1987: Tynemouth
Party	Candidate	Votes	%	±%
Conservative	Neville Trotter	25,113	43.2	▼4.9
Labour	Patrick Cosgrove	22,530	38.8	▲7.5
Liberal	David Mayhew	10,446	18.0	▼2.1
Majority		2,583	4.4	▼12.8
Turnout		58,089	78.1	▲3.5
Conservative hold		Swing	▼6.42	

The 1983 election saw Neville Trotter's biggest majority after a landslide victory won by Margaret Thatcher.

General election 1983: Tynemouth
Party	Candidate	Votes	%	±%
Conservative	Neville Trotter	27,029	48.1	▼3.5
Labour	Patrick Cosgrove	17,420	31.3	▼7.2
Liberal	David Mayhew	11,153	20.1	▲10.3
Majority		9,609	17.2	▲4.2
Turnout		55.602	74.6	▼3.1
Conservative hold		Swing	▲2.0	

=== Elections in the 1970s ===
1979: Patrick 'Paddy' Cosgrove's first of four attempts to win the seat. Cosgrove was the Labour councillor for Whitley Bay Ward.

General election 1979: Tynemouth
Party	Candidate	Votes	%	±%
Conservative	Neville Trotter	29,941	51.57	
Labour	Patrick Cosgrove (Note: Cosgrove was a Whitley Bay councillor and leading North East barrister)	22,377	38.55	
Liberal	R. Pinkney	5,736	9.88	
Majority		7,564	13.02	
Turnout		58,054	77.69	
Conservative hold		Swing		

General election October 1974: Tynemouth
Party	Candidate	Votes	%	±%
Conservative	Neville Trotter	24,510	43.16	
Labour	J. Miller	21,389	37.66	
Liberal	Rodney Turner	10,895	19.18	
Majority		3,121	5.50	
Turnout		56,794	74.29	
Conservative hold		Swing		

February 1974: Neville Trotter, a Newcastle City Councillor and Chartered Accountant, became MP.

General election February 1974: Tynemouth
Party	Candidate	Votes	%	±%
Conservative	Neville Trotter	26,824	44.22	
Labour	David Carlton	20,437	33.69	
Liberal	Rodney Turner	13,393	22.08	
Majority		6,387	10.53	
Turnout		60,654	80.02	
Conservative hold		Swing		

Jeremy Beecham would later become leader of Newcastle City Council and a Peer.

General election 1970: Tynemouth
Party	Candidate	Votes	%	±%
Conservative	Irene Ward	30,773	51.36	
Labour	Jeremy Beecham	23,927	39.93	
Liberal	Rodney Turner	5,221	8.71	New
Majority		6,846	11.43	
Turnout		59,921	75.85	
Conservative hold		Swing		

=== Elections in the 1960s ===
1966: Gordon Adam would latterly become a North East MEP and make a failed bid to become Mayor of North Tyneside in 2001.

General election 1966: Tynemouth
Party	Candidate	Votes	%	±%
Conservative	Irene Ward	29,210	49.62	
Labour	Gordon Adam	25,814	43.85	
Independent	James C. Edwards	3,846	6.53	New
Majority		3,396	5.77	
Turnout		58,870	78.45	
Conservative hold		Swing		

General election 1964: Tynemouth
Party	Candidate	Votes	%	±%
Conservative	Irene Ward	33,342	56.29	
Labour	Albert Booth	25,894	43.71	
Majority		7,448	12.58	
Turnout		59,236	78.96	
Conservative hold		Swing		

=== Elections in the 1950s ===
General election 1959: Tynemouth
Party	Candidate	Votes	%	±%
Conservative	Irene Ward	32,810	56.37	
Labour	William H. Hutchinson	18,866	32.42	
Liberal	David N. Thompson	6,525	11.21	
Majority		13,994	23.95	
Turnout		58,201	80.53	
Conservative hold		Swing		

General election 1955: Tynemouth
Party	Candidate	Votes	%	±%
Conservative	Irene Ward	30,949	55.12	
Labour	James Finegan	20,113	35.82	
Liberal	Roy Cairncross	5,082	9.05	New
Majority		10,836	19.30	
Turnout		56,144	79.35	
Conservative hold		Swing		

General election 1951: Tynemouth
Party	Candidate	Votes	%	±%
Conservative	Irene Ward	33,800	56.39	
Labour	Grace Colman	26,144	43.61	
Majority		7,656	12.78	
Turnout		59,944	84.54	
Conservative hold		Swing		

General election 1950: Tynemouth
Party	Candidate	Votes	%	±%
Conservative	Irene Ward	28,785	49.30	
Labour	Grace Colman	23,148	39.65	
Liberal	E.B. Slack	6,452	11.05	
Majority		5,637	9.65	
Turnout		58,385	84.01	
Conservative gain from Labour		Swing		

=== Elections in the 1940s ===
General election 1945: Tynemouth
Party	Candidate	Votes	%	±%
Labour	Grace Colman	13,963	46.07	
Conservative	Alexander Russell	10,884	35.91	
Liberal	Kenneth Paterson Chitty	5,460	18.02	
Majority		3,079	10.16	N/A
Turnout		30,307	76.85	
Labour gain from Conservative		Swing		

=== Elections in the 1930s ===
General election 1935: Tynemouth
Party	Candidate	Votes	%	±%
Conservative	Alexander Russell	16,003	47.1	▼4.7
Labour	Samuel Segal	10,145	29.8	▲6.0
Liberal	John Stanley Holmes	7,868	23.1	▼1.3
Majority		5,858	17.3	▼10.1
Turnout		34,016	79.22	▼4.9
Conservative hold		Swing		

General election 1931: Tynemouth
Party	Candidate	Votes	%	±%
Conservative	Alexander Russell	17,607	51.8	▲14.8
Liberal	John Stanley Holmes	8,295	24.4	▼8.7
Labour	T.H. Knight	8,110	23.8	▼6.1
Majority		9,312	27.38	▲23.5
Turnout		34,012	84.15	▲0.8
Conservative hold		Swing		

=== Elections in the 1920s ===
General election 1929: Tynemouth
Party	Candidate	Votes	%	±%
Unionist	Alexander Russell	11,785	37.0	▼8.2
Liberal	Richard Irvin	10,545	33.1	▲5.7
Labour	John Stuart Barr	9,503	29.9	▲2.5
Majority		1,240	3.9	▼13.9
Turnout		31,833	83.3	▼1.3
Unionist hold		Swing	▼7.0	

General election 1924: Tynemouth
Party	Candidate	Votes	%	±%
Unionist	Alexander Russell	11,210	45.2	▲4.2
Liberal	Harry Barnes	6,820	27.4	▼10.9
Labour	John Stuart Barr	6,818	27.4	▲6.7
Majority		4,390	17.8	▲15.1
Turnout		24,848	84.6	▲3.5
Unionist hold		Swing	▲7.5	

Harry Barnes

General election 1923: Tynemouth
Party	Candidate	Votes	%	±%
Unionist	Alexander Russell	9,612	41.0	▼7.1
Liberal	Harry Barnes	9,008	38.3	▲9.3
Labour	W. Pitt	4,875	20.7	▼2.2
Majority		604	2.7	▼16.4
Turnout		23,495	81.1	▼2.4
Unionist hold		Swing	▼8.2	

General election 1922: Tynemouth
Party	Candidate	Votes	%	±%
Unionist	Alexander Russell	11,244	48.1	▲13.4
Liberal	Herbert Craig	6,787	29.0	▼3.2
Labour	George Harold Humphrey	5,362	22.9	▲7.7
Majority		4,457	19.1	▲16.6
Turnout		23,393	83.5	▲19.7
Unionist hold		Swing	▲8.4	

=== Elections in the 1910s ===
Craig

General election 1918: Tynemouth
Party		Candidate	Votes	%	±%
C	Unionist	Charles Percy	5,883	34.7	▼14.2
	Liberal	Herbert Craig	5,434	32.2	▼18.9
	Independent Labour	George Harold Humphrey	2,566	15.2	New
	Independent	Henry Gregg (British politician)	2,495	14.8	New
	National	Dixon Scott	517	3.1	New
Majority			449	2.5	N/A
Turnout			16,895	63.8	▼15.6
	Unionist gain from Liberal		Swing	▲2.4	
C indicates candidate endorsed by the coalition government.

1918: Dixon Scott was the founder of Newcastle's 'News Cinema', the modern 'Tyneside Cinema'.

General election December 1910: Tynemouth
Party	Candidate	Votes	%	±%
Liberal	Herbert Craig	4,106	51.1	▼1.8
Conservative	Charles Percy	3,939	48.9	▲1.8
Majority		177	2.2	▼3.6
Turnout		8,045	79.4	▼3.9
Registered electors		10,122		
Liberal hold		Swing	▼1.8	

General election January 1910: Tynemouth
Party	Candidate	Votes	%	±%
Liberal	Herbert Craig	4,487	52.9	▼2.0
Conservative	Edward George Spencer-Churchill	3,993	47.1	▲2.0
Majority		494	5.8	▼4.0
Turnout		8,480	83.3	▼3.3
Registered electors		10,122		
Liberal hold		Swing	▼2.0	

=== Elections in the 1900s ===
Herbert Craig

General election January 1906: Tynemouth
Party	Candidate	Votes	%	±%
Liberal	Herbert Craig	4,286	54.9	▲8.0
Conservative	Frederick Leverton Harris	3,522	45.1	▼8.0
Majority		764	9.8	N/A
Turnout		7,808	86.6	▲4.6
Registered electors		9,019		
Liberal gain from Conservative		Swing	▲8.0	

General election 1900: Tynemouth
Party	Candidate	Votes	%	±%
Conservative	Frederick Leverton Harris	3,501	53.1	▲1.4
Liberal	F.D. Blake	3,094	46.9	▼1.4
Majority		407	6.2	▲2.8
Turnout		6,595	82.0	▲2.0
Registered electors		8,041		
Conservative hold		Swing	▲1.4	

=== Elections in the 1890s ===
General election 1895: Tynemouth
Party	Candidate	Votes	%	±%
Conservative	Richard Donkin	3,168	51.7	▼1.2
Liberal	Francis Blake	2,959	48.3	▲1.2
Majority		209	3.4	▼2.4
Turnout		6,127	80.0	▼0.9
Registered electors		7,659		
Conservative hold		Swing	▼1.2	

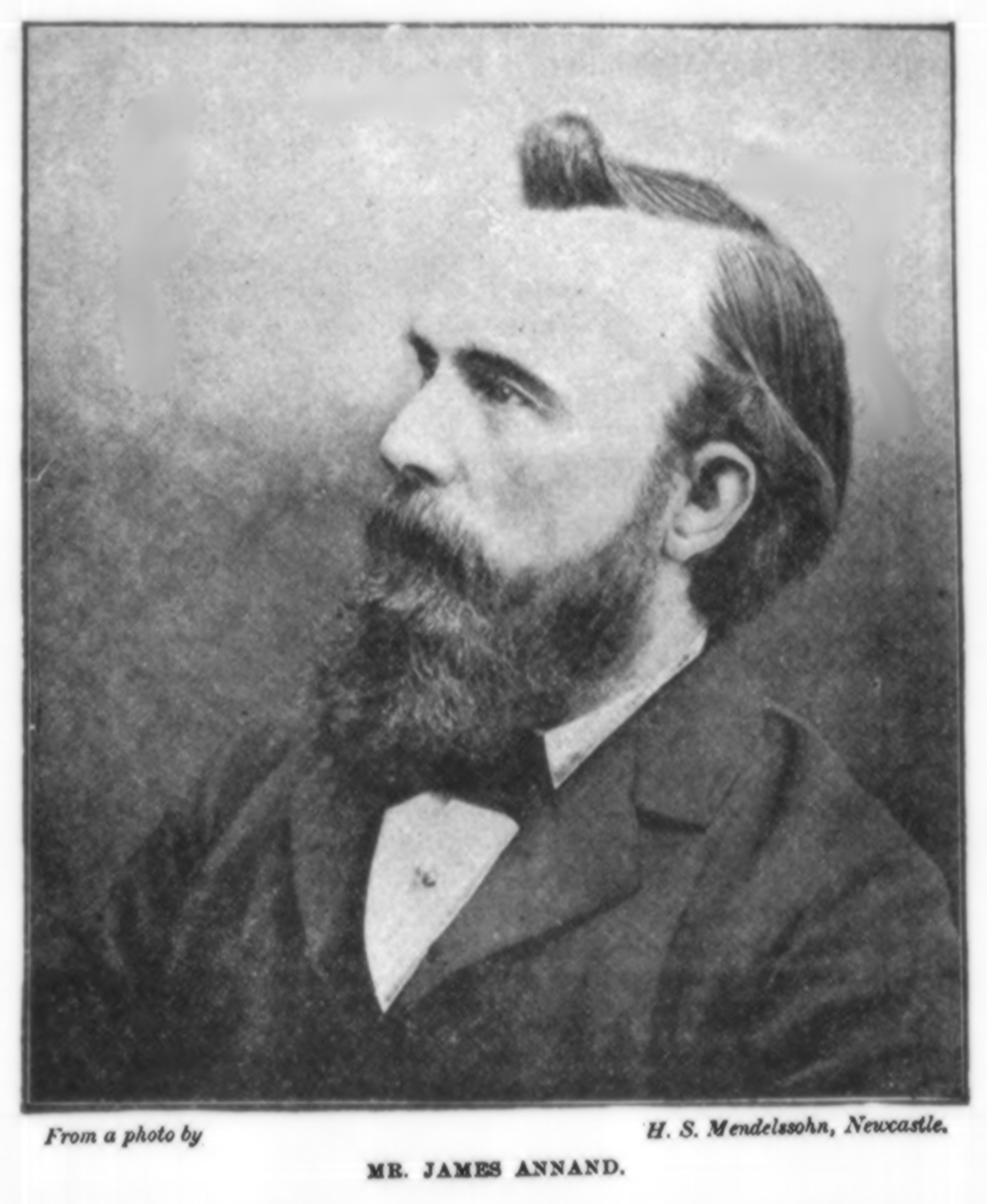
James Annand

General election 1892: Tynemouth
Party	Candidate	Votes	%	±%
Conservative	Richard Donkin	3,121	52.9	▼2.2
Liberal	James Annand	2,783	47.1	▲2.2
Majority		338	5.8	▼4.4
Turnout		5,904	80.9	▲4.8
Registered electors		7,300		
Conservative hold		Swing	▼2.2	

=== Elections in the 1880s ===
General election 1886: Tynemouth
Party	Candidate	Votes	%	±%
Conservative	Richard Donkin	2,795	55.1	▼2.1
Liberal	William Thomas Raymond	2,277	44.9	▲2.1
Majority		518	10.2	▼4.2
Turnout		5,072	76.1	▼3.3
Registered electors		6,669		
Conservative hold		Swing	▼2.1	

General election 1885: Tynemouth
Party	Candidate	Votes	%	±%
Conservative	Richard Donkin	3,027	57.2	
Liberal	Joseph Spence	2,269	42.8	
Majority		758	14.4	
Turnout		5,296	79.4	
Registered electors		6,669		
Conservative win (new seat)				

== See also ==
- List of parliamentary constituencies in Tyne and Wear
- History of parliamentary constituencies and boundaries in Tyne and Wear
- History of parliamentary constituencies and boundaries in Northumberland
- List of parliamentary constituencies in North East England (region)
