= Parliamentary constituencies in Northumberland =

The county of Northumberland is divided into 4 parliamentary constituencies, all of which are county constituencies.

== Constituencies ==
† Conservative ‡ Labour ¤ Reform UK

Constituency (Note: BC denotes borough constituency, CC denotes county constituency.)	Electorate	Majority (Note: The majority is the number of votes the winning candidate receives more than their nearest rival.)	Member of Parliament	Nearest opposition	Electoral wards	Map
Blyth and Ashington CC	76,263	9,173	Ian Lavery‡	Mark Peart¤	Northumberland County Council: Ashington Central, Bedlington Central, Bedlington East, Bedlington West, Bothal, Choppington, college, Cowpen, Croft, Haydon, Hirst, Isabella, Kitty Brewster, Newbiggin Central and East, Newsham, Plessey, Seaton with Newbiggin West, Sleekburn, South Blyth, Stakeford, Wensleydale.	
Cramlington and Killingworth CC	76,228	12,820	Emma Foody‡	Gordon Fletcher¤	Newcastle City Council: Castle (polling districts F01, F02 and F03). North Tyneside Council: Camperdown, Killingworth, Valley, Weetslade. Northumberland County Council: Cramlington East, Cramlington Eastfield, Cramlington North, Cramlington South East, Cramlington Village, Cramlington West, Hartley, Holywell, Seghill with Seaton Delaval.	
Hexham CC	76,431	3,713	Joe Morris‡	Guy Opperman†	Newcastle City Council: Callerton and Throckley. Northumberland County Council: Bellingham, Bywell, Corbridge, Haltwhistle, Haydon and Hadrian, Hexham Central with Acomb, Hexham East, Hexham West, Humshaugh, Longhorsley, Ponteland East and Stannington, Ponteland North, Ponteland South with Heddon, Ponteland West, Prudhoe North, Prudhoe South, South Tyneside, Stocksfield and Broomhaugh.	
North Northumberland CC	74,132	5,067	David Smith‡	Anne-Marie Trevelyan†	Northumberland County Council: Alnwick, Amble, Amble West with Warkworth, Bamburgh, Berwick East, Berwick North, Berwick West with Ord, Druridge Bay, Longhoughton, Lynemouth, Morpeth Kirkhill, Morpeth North, Morpeth Stobhill, Norham and Islandshires, Pegswood, Rothbury, Shilbottle, Wooler.	

== Boundary changes ==
=== 2024 ===
See 2023 review of Westminster constituencies for further details.

Former name	Boundaries 2010–2024	Current name	Boundaries 2024–present
1. Berwick-upon-Tweed CC; 2. Blyth Valley BC; 3. Hexham CC; 4. Wansbeck CC	2010–2024 constituencies in Northumberland	1. Blyth and Ashington BC; 2. Cramlington and Killingworth CC; 3. Hexham CC; 4. North Northumberland CC	Current constituencies in Northumberland

For the 2023 review of Westminster constituencies, which redrew the constituency map ahead of the 2024 United Kingdom general election, the Boundary Commission for England opted to combine Northumberland with the Tyne and Wear boroughs of Newcastle upon Tyne and North Tyneside as a sub-region of the North East Region, with the creation of two cross-county boundary constituencies, resulting in the abolition of Berwick-upon-Tweed, Blyth Valley and Wansbeck.

The following seats resulted from the boundary review in Northumberland:

- Blyth and Ashington
- Cramlington and Killingworth (parts also in Newcastle upon Tyne and North Tyneside)
- Hexham (part in Newcastle upon Tyne)
- North Northumberland

=== 2010 ===
Under the fifth periodic review of Westminster constituencies, the Boundary Commission for England decided to retain Northumberland's constituencies for the 2010 election, making a very small change between Berwick-upon-Tweed and Hexham to realign constituency boundaries with the boundaries of current local government wards.

Name	Boundaries 1997–2010	Boundaries 2010–2024
1. Berwick-upon-Tweed CC; 2. Blyth Valley BC; 3. Hexham CC; 4. Wansbeck CC	Parliamentary constituencies in Northumberland (1997–2010)	Parliamentary constituencies in Northumberland (2010–2024)

== Results history ==
Primary data source: House of Commons research briefing – General election results from 1918 to 2019

=== 2024 ===
The number of votes cast for each political party who fielded candidates in constituencies comprising Northumberland in the 2024 general election were as follows:

Party	Votes	%	Change from 2019	Seats	Change from 2019
Labour	84,147	45.1%	▲11.2%	4	▲3
Conservative	47,776	25.6%	▼23.2%	0	▼3
Reform UK	27,999	15.0%	▲11.1%	0	0
Liberal Democrats	10,876	5.8%	▼4.2%	0	0
Greens	8,314	4.5%	▲1.3%	0	0
Others	7,354	3.9%	▲3.7%	0	0
Total	186,466	100.0		4	

=== Percentage votes ===
Election year	1983	1987	1992	1997	2001	2005	2010	2015	2017	2019	2024
Labour	30.0	34.7	39.9	48.7	43.2	39.4	30.2	33.5	42.8	33.9	45.1
Conservative	33.5	28.6	30.8	22.7	26.1	25.6	29.0	34.9	44.4	48.8	25.6
Reform UK^{2}	–	–	–	–	–	–	–	–	–	3.9	15.0
Liberal Democrat^{1}	36.3	36.4	28.2	25.0	27.9	33.7	32.0	12.0	9.3	10.0	5.8
Green Party	–	*	*	*	*	*	0.4	4.3	2.1	3.2	4.5
UKIP	–	–	–	*	*	*	2.4	15.2	1.4	*	–
Other	0.2	0.4	1.0	3.7	2.8	1.3	5.9	0.1	–	0.2	

^{1}1983 & 1987 – SDP–Liberal Alliance

^{2}2019 – Brexit Party

* Included in Other

=== Seats ===
Election year	1983	1987	1992	1997	2001	2005	2010	2015	2017	2019	2024
Labour	2	2	2	2	2	2	2	2	2	1	4
Conservative	1	1	1	1	1	1	1	2	2	3	0
Liberal Democrat^{1}	1	1	1	1	1	1	1	0	0	0	0
Total	4	4	4	4	4	4	4	4	4	4	4

^{1}1983 & 1987 – SDP–Liberal Alliance

=== Maps ===
==== 1885–1910 ====
1885

1886

1892

1895

1900

1906

Jan 1910

Dec 1910

==== 1918–1945 ====
1918

1922

1923

1924

1929

1931

1935

1945

==== 1950–1979 ====
1950

1951

1955

1959

1964

1966

1970

Feb 1974

Oct 1974

1979

==== 1983–present ====
1983

1987

1992

1997

2001

2005

2010

2015

2017

2019

2024

== Historical representation by party ==
A cell marked → (with a different colour background to the preceding cell) indicates that the previous MP continued to sit under a new party name.

=== 1885 to 1918 ===
Conservative Labour Liberal Liberal-Labour Liberal Unionist

Constituency	1885	1886	1892	93	1895	1900	1906	07	08	Jan 1910	Dec 1910	16	18
Berwick-upon-Tweed	E. Grey											Blake	
Hexham	MacInnes		Clayton	MacInnes	Beaumont			Holt					
Morpeth	Burt												
Newcastle upon Tyne (two MPs)	Morley				Cruddas	Plummer	Hudson						
Newcastle upon Tyne (two MPs)	Cowen	J. Craig	Hamond			Renwick	Cairns		Renwick	Shortt			
Tynemouth	Donkin					Harris	H. Craig						
Tyneside	A. Grey	Beaumont	Pease			Smith	Robertson						
Wansbeck	Fenwick												Mason

=== 1918 to 1950 ===
Coalition Liberal (1918–22) / National Liberal (1922–23) Coalition National Democratic & Labour Conservative Independent Conservative Labour Liberal National Liberal (1931–68) Speaker

Constituency	1918	19	1922	23	1923	1924	26	29	1929	31	1931	1935	40	40	41	43	44	1945
Berwick-upon-Tweed	Blake		Philipson^{1}						Todd			Seely			Grey		Beveridge	Thorp
Hexham	Brown				Finney	Brown										→		
Newcastle upon Tyne North	Grattan-Doyle												Headlam	→				
Tynemouth	Percy		Russell															Colman
Newcastle upon Tyne Central	Renwick		Trevelyan								Denville							Wilkes
Newcastle upon Tyne East	Barnes		Bell	Henderson	Aske	Connolly			Aske	→								Blenkinsop
Newcastle upon Tyne West	Shortt		Adams		Ramage	Palin					Leech		Nunn					Popplewell
Wallsend	Simm		Hastings				Bondfield				Ward							McKay
Wansbeck	Mason	→	Warne					Shield			Cruddas		Scott					Robens
Morpeth	Cairns			Smillie					Edwards		Nicholson	Taylor						

^{1} original 1922 victor Hilton Philipson (National Liberal) declared void due to electoral fraud. Mabel Philipson won the subsequent by-election for the Conservatives.

=== 1950 to 1983 ===
Conservative Independent Labour Labour Liberal National Liberal (1931–68) Social Democratic Speaker

Constituency	1950	1951	54	1955	57	1959	60	1964	1966	1970	73	Feb 1974	Oct 1974	76	1979	81
Berwick-upon-Tweed	Thorp	Lambton									Beith					
Hexham	Brown	Speir							Rippon							
Newcastle upon Tyne North	Headlam	Lloyd George			Elliott											
Tynemouth	Ward											Trotter				
Newcastle upon Tyne East	Blenkinsop					Montgomery		Rhodes					Thomas			→
Blyth	Robens						Milne					→	Ryman			
Morpeth	Taylor		Owen							Grant						
Newcastle upon Tyne Central	Wilkes	Short												Cowans		
Newcastle upon Tyne West	Popplewell								Brown							
Wallsend	McKay							Garrett								

=== 1983 to present ===
Conservative Labour Liberal Liberal Democrats

Constituency	1983	1987	88	1992	1997	2001	2005	2010	2015	2017	2019	2024
Berwick-upon-Tweed / North Northumberland (2024)	Beith		→						Trevelyan			Smith
Blyth Valley / Cramlington and Killingworth^{1} (2024)	Ryman	Campbell									Levy	Foody
Hexham^{1}	Rippon	Amos		Atkinson				Opperman				Morris
Wansbeck / Blyth and Ashington (2024)	Thompson				Murphy			Lavery				

^{1}contains areas of Tyne and Wear since 2024

== See also ==
- Parliamentary constituencies in North East England
- History of parliamentary constituencies and boundaries in Northumberland
