= Wansbeck by-election =

Wansbeck by-election may refer to one of three parliamentary by-elections held in the British House of Commons constituency of Wansbeck in Northumberland:

- 1918 Wansbeck by-election
- 1929 Wansbeck by-election
- 1940 Wansbeck by-election

See also

- Wansbeck (UK Parliament constituency)
