= Ellington Colliery =

Former colliery in Northumberland, England

Ellington Colliery The Big E
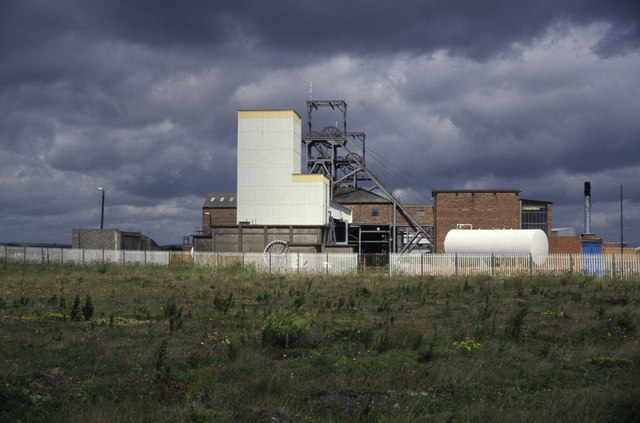
- Ellington Colliery

- Location within Northumberland
- Location: Ellington, Northumberland, England; 55.217°N 1.555°W
- Products: Coal
- Production: 2,326,000 tonnes (2,564,000 tons)
- Financial year: 1989/1990
- Greatest depth: 2,600 feet (800 m)
- Opened: 1909
- Closed: 2005
- Company: See section

Ellington Colliery (also known as The Big E), was a coal mine situated to the south of the village of Ellington in Northumberland, England. The colliery was the last deep coal mine in the north east of England (also known as the Great Northern Coalfield). At one time, the deepest part of the mine was 800 metres (2,600 ft) and it extended 15 miles (24 km) under the North Sea. During the 1980s, the pit (along with Lynemouth Colliery) was known as the biggest undersea mine in the world and produced 69% of the mined coal in Northumberland.

Ellington had several faces for mining and was known for winning coal from under the North Sea, before flooding caused the early closure of the mine.

== History ==
The pit was first sunk into the Great Northern Coalfield in 1909, but was not completed until 1913. Coal was mined from the Ashington, High Main, Main, Yard, Low Main and Brass Thill seams. By 1974, over 66% of the mine's output was going to the adjacent aluminium smelter, with the remainder being sold to the CEGB. Ellington and Lynemouth Collieries were linked underground, and were known as Ellington Combine. When Lynemouth Colliery was deliberately flooded to try and extinguish a fire, a new drift entrance was built called Bewick Drift, with all coal from Ellington being brought to the surface there and then latterly moved on a conveyor to the aluminium smelter. Bewick Drift opened in 1968, and the railway connection to Ellington from the west became redundant. It closed in the late 1970s.

During the 1970s, coal waste from Ellington and Lynemouth Colleries was tipped into the sea. The action of the waves upon the coal waste separated out the coal which would float. This waste, coupled with coal from the seams under the sea being washed up on local beaches, created a local harvesting industry known as Seacoaling.

In 1983, the pit set a record by outputting 1,000,000 tonnes (1,100,000 tons) in just 29 weeks. At the same time, it was estimated that Ellington employed 50 pit ponies, one of the last large industrial producers to do so. Throughout the 1980s, Ellington remained the most profitable colliery in the Northumberland coalfield, and during 1985/86, it was only colliery in that area to turn a profit. It was also the worlds' largest undersea project, and regularly accounted for over 69% of all deep-mined coal in the county of Northumberland.

In February 1984, a few weeks before the start of the 1984–1985 miners' strike, the National Coal Board chairman, Ian MacGregor visited the colliery but was "besieged" by 400 miners protesting about the planned closure of Bates Colliery at Blyth. This led to MacGregors planned underground tour being cancelled and as he was being given a secure police escort off the site, the protesters surged forward and a low fence collapsed with MacGregor being "jostled" to the ground. The NUM later said it would not apologise for the incident.

British Coal closed the mine on 18 February 1994, with the loss of 1,100 jobs. The last pit ponies used in a commercial venture in England were also retired at the same time. The mine was acquired by RJB Mining for £800 million, and they reopened it for production in March 1995.

In November 1999, the site was threatened with closure by RJB Mining due to "deteriorating geological conditions". The company said that the coal being produced was too low quality, and slated closure of the site for February 2000.

The mine was used as a backdrop for the fictional colliery in the film Billy Elliot in 2000. Ellington was used, because it was one of a very small number of operational mines remaining in the north east of England.

The mine was once again threatened with closure in 2002 after running up losses of £26 million in 2001. But an injection of £1 million in cash was used to search for new seams, which at the time, was said to have guaranteed the life of the mine until 2007.

Final closure of the mine came on 26 January 2005. An inundation of water underground made operations unsafe, although the pumps were kept working in an effort to see what could be salvaged from underground, however, over £8 million worth of equipment was left in the floodwaters. The 300+ miners who worked at the mine were later given £6,000 each after an employment tribunal ruled that UK Coal had not given the statutory 90-day consultation notice of closure. UK Coal stated that the immediate closure due to flooding prevented them giving prior notification.

By February 2006, two of the shafts had been capped and the 90-foot (27 m) winding tower had been demolished. Since closure, the site has been redeveloped for housing.

A report released in 2020, estimated that over 30 million tonnes (33,000,000 tons) of colliery waste had been tipped at the coast near to Lynemouth from Ellington Combine and other local pits. Aside from the environmental damage, the tipped spoil acted as a replenishment for the nearby beaches, and with Ellington closing in 2005, this tipping had ceased. The beaches are now suffering from faster erosion rates than were previously recorded, as there is now no beach replenishment.

== Production ==
Between 1974 and its closure in 2005, an average of 66% of the mine's output went to the nearby Lynemouth Power Station.

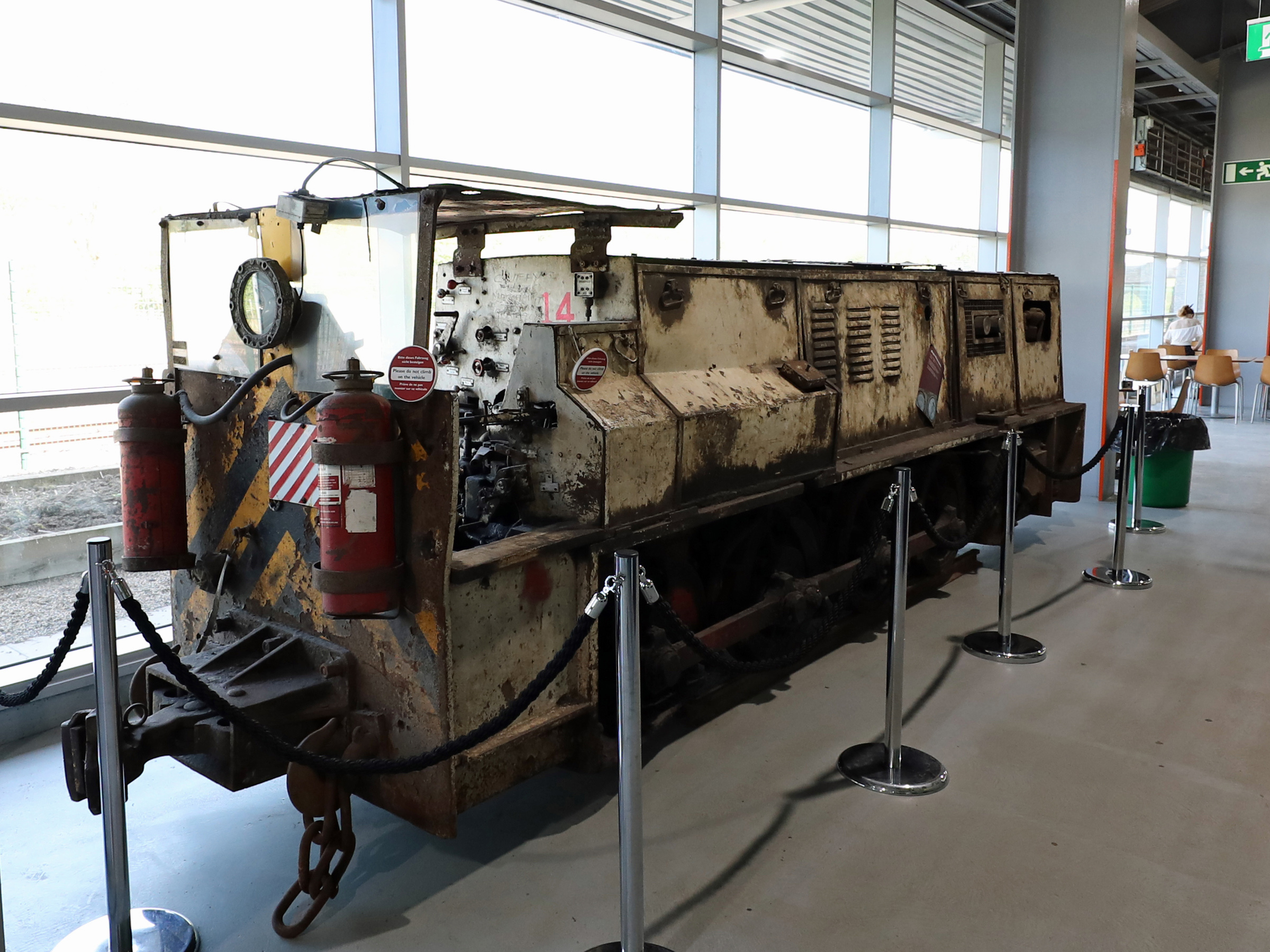
Ellington Colliery Paddy Train at the NRM Shildon

Production statistics of Ellington Colliery
Year	Production	Notes
1947	412,000 tonnes (454,000 tons)	
1981/1982	1,783,000 tonnes (1,965,000 tons)	
1985/1986	2,118,000 tonnes (2,335,000 tons)	
1988/1989	2,326,000 tonnes (2,564,000 tons)	
1989/1990	2,110,000 tonnes (2,330,000 tons)	
1990/1991	2,300,000 tonnes (2,500,000 tons)	
1993/1994	2,200,000 tonnes (2,400,000 tons)	
1994/1995	1,200,000 tonnes (1,300,000 tons)	Projected amount in 1993 due to electricity generation cutbacks
2001	600,000 tonnes (660,000 tons)	
2002	700,000 tonnes (770,000 tons)	
2003	600,000 tonnes (660,000 tons)	

== Ownership ==
- 1909–1947 Ashington Coal Company
- 1947–1986 National Coal Board
- 1986–1994 British Coal
- 1994–2001 RJB Mining
- 2001–2005 UK Coal

Between 1947 and 1992, the mine was in public ownership with the switch in 1986 being a name change. Likewise, the period of 1992 to 2005, the mine was in private ownership with the switch in 2001 being a name change after Richard Budge retired. Whilst the mine was acquired by RJB Mining in 1994, it did not resume production until 1995.

== Notable colliers ==
- The following Labour MPs for Wansbeck, worked at the colliery:
  - Ian Lavery was a miner at Ellington between 1981 and 1986
  - Denis Murphy, worked at the mine for 30 years
  - Jack Thompson, worked as an electrical engineer at the mine
