= Lynemouth power station =

Biomass power station in Northumberland, England

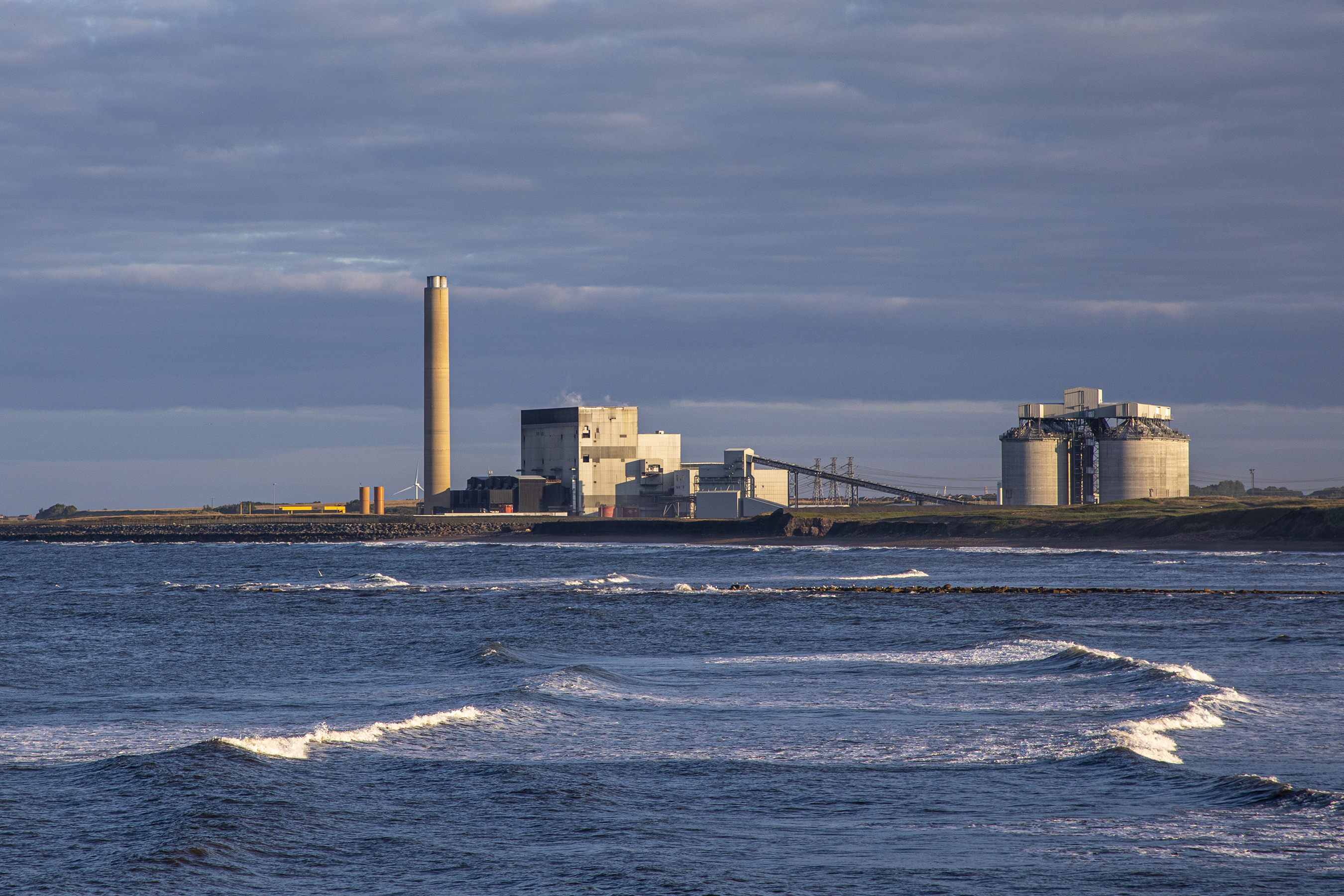
- Lynemouth Power Station from Cresswell
- Official name: Lynemouth Power Station
- Country: England
- Location: Lynemouth, Northumberland
- Coordinates: 55°12′15″N 1°31′15″W
- Status: Operational
- Construction began: 1968
- Commission date: 1972
- Owners: Rio Tinto Alcan (1972–2013); RWE npower (2013–2016); EPH (2016–present)
- Operator: EP UK Investments

Thermal power station
- Primary fuel: Biomass

Power generation
- Units operational: Three 140 MW Parsons
- Nameplate capacity: 420 MW

External links
- Website: https://www.epuki.co.uk/
- Commons: Related media on Commons

Lynemouth Power Station is a biomass power plant which provides electricity for the UK National Grid. Until March 2012, it was the main source of electricity for the nearby Alcan Lynemouth Aluminium Smelter. It is located on the coast of Northumberland, north east of the town of Ashington in north east England. The station has stood as a landmark on the Northumberland coast since it opened in 1972, and had been privately owned by aluminium company Rio Tinto Alcan throughout its operation until December 2013, when RWE npower took over. In January 2016 it was acquired by the Czech company Energetický a průmyslový holding.

The station was one of the most recently built coal-fired power stations in the United Kingdom, but with a generating capacity of only 420 megawatts (MW), was one of the smallest.

In 2011, it was announced that the power station may be converted to burn biomass only, in a bid to avoid government legislation. In January 2016 the station was purchased by Energetický a průmyslový holding (EPH). The station converted to biomass in 2018, ending its use of coal. Two separate wind farm plants currently have permission to be built near the station, one for a 13 turbine wind farm near the smelter and another three turbine wind farm to the north of the station. In 2009, Alcan announced that they hope to fit the station with carbon capture and storage technology.

== History ==
In 1968, Alcan had applied for planning permission for the construction of a new aluminium smelter in Northumberland at Lynemouth. Later that year, Alcan was granted the permission and site preparation would soon begin. However, to meet the electric demand of the new smelter, a power station would also be needed to be a built. Therefore, Lynemouth Power Station was constructed only 800 m (2,600 ft) from the aluminium smelter.

The smelter and power station were constructed in southeast Northumberland to lower high unemployment numbers. The site was chosen because of the nearby Ellington and Lynemouth collieries. Ellington Colliery was sunk in 1909 and Lynemouth Colliery in 1927. In 1968 the two collieries were connected underground by the Bewick Drift, from which coal was brought to the surface. The Drift had no rail connection, and so coal was sent to the washery at Lynemouth by conveyor belt. The power station was constructed at the end of the conveyor belt.

Both buildings were designed by architects Yorke Rosenberg Mardall, with engineering consultation from Engineering & Power Consultants Ltd. The power station was constructed by Tarmac Construction and the smelter by M.J. Gleeson Company. Both the power station and smelter were brought into operation in March 1972.

== Design and specifications ==
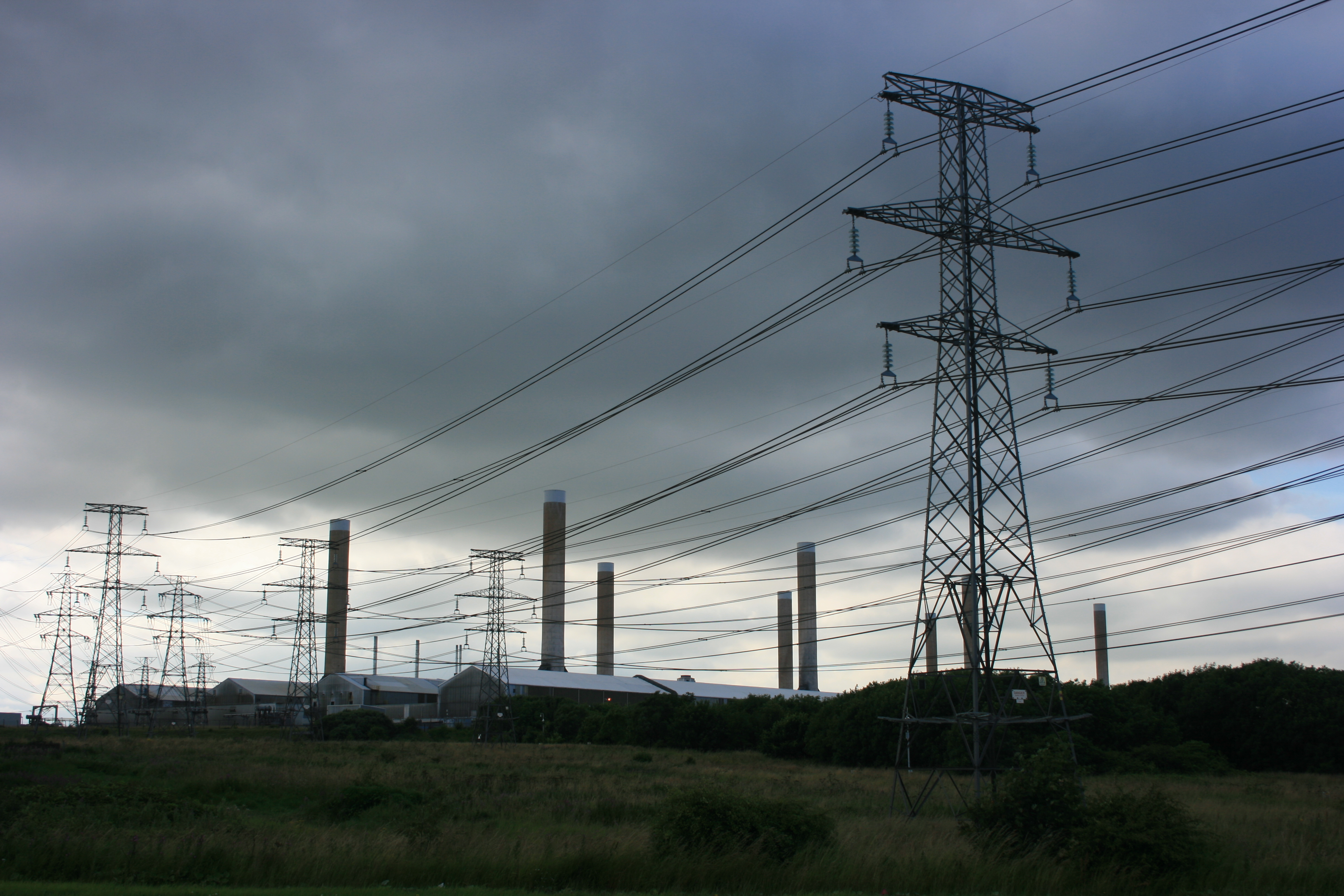
Electricity is fed from the power station to the smelter by a 24 kilovolt connection

The boiler house and turbine hall have a steel frame with aluminium cladding. Other structures include a single 114 m (374 ft) tall chimney of reinforced concrete, and coal delivery and sorting plant.

The station's boiler house houses three 380 MWth International Combustion boilers, which were fuelled by pulverised bituminous coal. Each of these provide steam a 140 megawatt (MW) Parsons turbo-alternators, situated in the station's turbine hall. These give the station a total generating capacity of 420 MW. The electricity generated was fed at 24 kilovolts (kV) to a substation to power the smelter during operation. The substation also has a 132 kV connection to the National Grid, where electricity is distributed to homes and other industries by Northern Electric Distribution Limited. The smelter's two pot lines required 310 MW of the 420 MW that the power station produces, so the excess 110 MW was fed into the national grid. Since the closure of the smelter, all generation goes to the grid.

Between 1999 and 2000, the power station was given a turbine upgrade. In 2000, the station's condensers were also refurbished. The condenser refurbishment was carried out by Alstom. These improvements saw an increase in the station's generating capacity, thermal efficiency and MWh production.

== Operations ==
=== Coal supply and transport ===
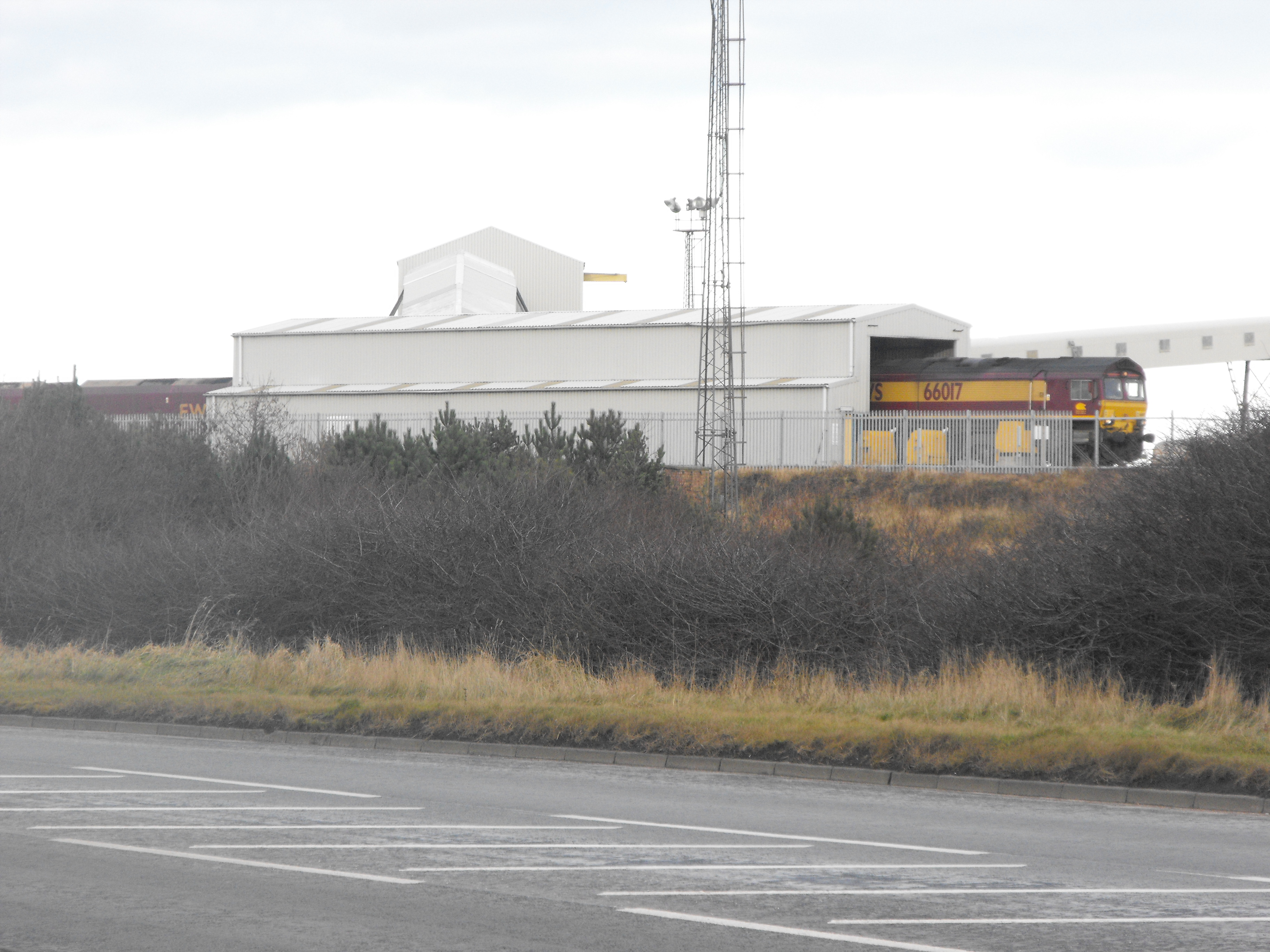
Coal was delivered to the power station by railway and unloaded using a merry-go-round system

The power station was the leading coal customer in Northumberland, burning 1,200,000 tonnes of coal a year, with a weekly coal consumption between 25,000 and 27,000 tonnes. The station had relatively limited coal storage facilities, and was only able to hold three to four weeks' worth of its fuel.

The station was designed specifically to burn coal from the Northumberland coalfields. The neighbouring Ellington Colliery originally fed coal directly to the power station using a conveyor belt from its Bewick Drift Mine, situated 970 metres (3,180 ft) from the station. Within a year of the power station opening, 3,000 men were employed between the Ellington and Lynemouth collieries, producing over two million tons of coal a year, the majority of it being sold to the power station. In 1994, Ellington Colliery connected underground with Lynemouth Colliery, but coal continued to be taken straight to the power station's coal sorting area using conveyor belts. This supply was supplemented by coal from local opencast mines. However, Ellington Colliery was forced to close when it flooded in January 2005. The station burned the colliery's remaining coal stock after it closed, and since then coal had been sourced from opencast mines in Northumberland and Scotland, but then a small amount of import was necessary.

Coal was then delivered to the station mainly using rail transport and was unloaded at the station using a merry-go-round system. Trains supplying the station used the Newbiggin and Lynemouth branch line of the Blyth and Tyne Railway, which also served the smelter. This line was originally used to export coal from the local coalfield, and also had passenger services. These passenger services ceased in 1964, and then the line was only used to serve the power station and smelter. Coal from the local opencast mines was brought to the station by road using heavy goods vehicles. Coal was graded and washed at the station prior to being burned.

With only one significant opencast in the local area mining past 2008, along with another smaller opencast at Stony Heap, there was a need for more local supplies of coal for the station because of the risks in depending upon overseas sources of coal. Long distance supplies of coal could see sharp fluctuations in price, as well as the flexibility and security of the supply, whereas local sources would not be as vulnerable to interruptions and would have fixed, contracted prices. The station was not an established importer of coal, having only imported since 2005. It is situated a long way from the major coal unloading ports of Teesside, Hull and Immingham, which had been booked by power stations closer to them. This meant that coal for the power station needed to be imported via Blyth or the Port of Tyne. However, because of the small sizes of these docks, they can only receive ships from Poland and Russia. Due to high production costs and industry restructuring in Poland though, the only realistic source of imported coal for the station was Russia. The environmental impact of shipping 1,000,000 tonnes of coal from Russia to Lynemouth was the production of 12,812 tonnes of CO_{2}, whereas hauling coal from local mines to the station would produce only 703 tonnes of CO_{2}. There were currently two local opencast mines for which planning approval had been granted, one at Shotton near Cramlington approved in 2007, the other at Potland Burn near Ashington approved in October 2008. However, the coal mined from Potland Burn would have had too high a sulphur content to meet the station's environmental requirements, meaning it would not have been an immediate choice of coal for the station. Coal had been provided by the Delhi surface mine at Blagdon, owned by Banks Developments, since 2002. It finished extracting coal in March 2009, following the permission of extension proposals to its original plans in May 2007.

=== Water use ===
For creating the steam to turn steam turbines and generate electricity, and for cooling the steam coming away from the turbines, water is needed, and is thus beneficial to have near any thermal power station. The cooling water that is used in the Lynemouth power station is taken from a body of water located close to the plant, the North Sea. The water is transferred from the sea to the plant by a series of shafts and tunnels. There are three condensers (one per each generating set) in the interior of the power station, which are used to cool the heated water before it is reused in the steam cycle. The cooling water is then transferred back to the North Sea.

Water used in the steam cycle is taken from the local mains water, supplied by Northumbrian Water. Up to 300,000 tons of mains water per year is used in the station; however, it has to be cleaned of impurities before use. This is done at an on site water treatment plant that uses a process of ion exchange to remove impurities such as silica and control PH levels so as to avoid boiler tube corrosion. This treated water is used to make superheated steam in the coal-fired boilers, that will turn the turbines before being recovered in the condenser and reused.

Operating close to the power station is a fishing bait company, Seabait. Seabait uses some of the excess hot water that the plant generates to grow worms four times as fast as in the wild. The worms are used for several purposes, primarily for providing worms as bait while fishing. However, the worms are also frozen, packaged and exported to seafood farms. This is seen as environmentally beneficial as it reduces the need for bait digging in natural habitats.

=== Ash removal ===
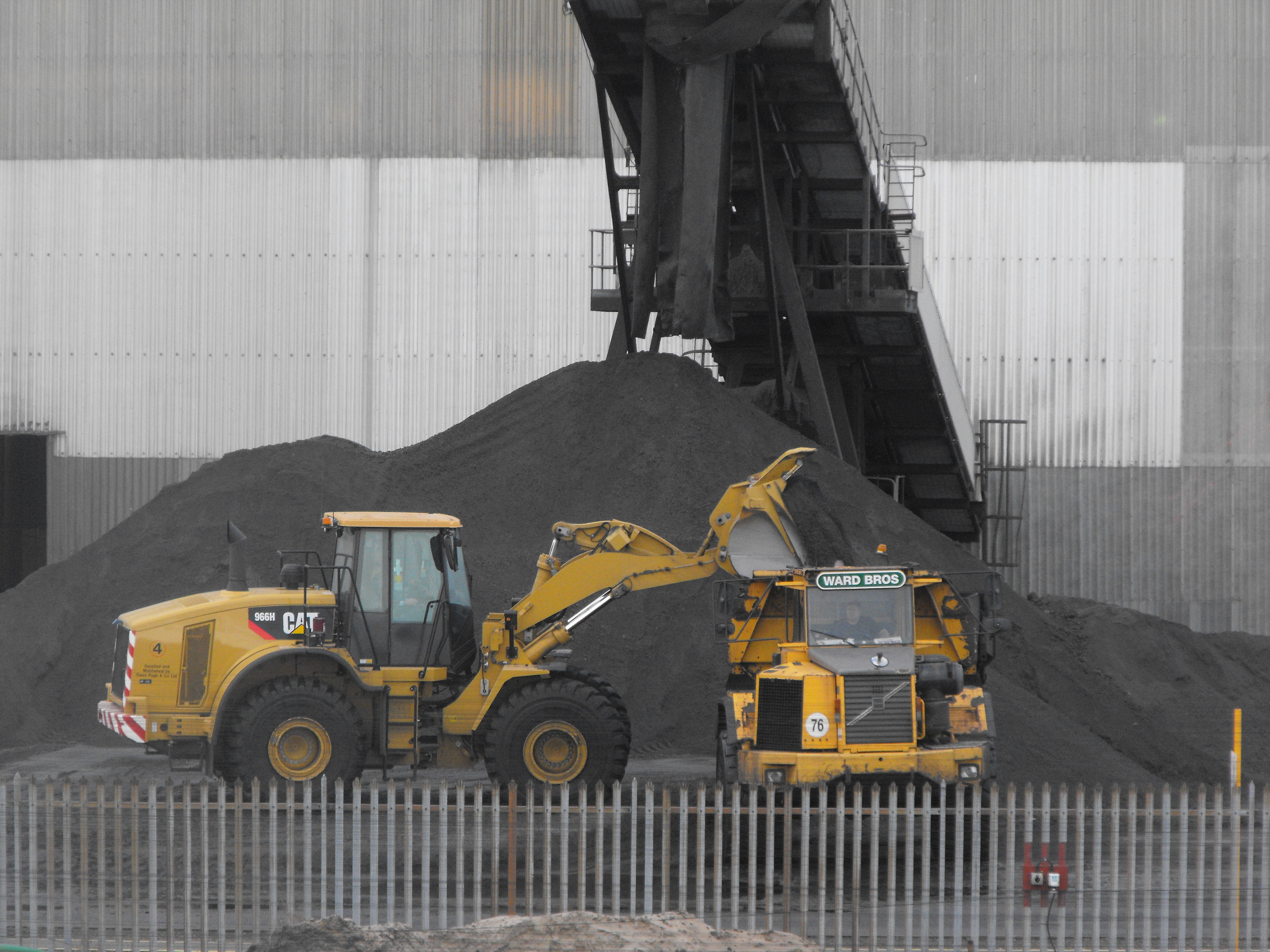
Ash from the station is usually either landfilled or recycled in the construction industry

Fly ash and bottom ash are two byproducts made through the burning of coal in power stations. Ash is normally dumped in the station's Ash Lagoons landfill site, which is located on site. Since 2006, ash produced at Lynemouth Power Station has been recycled and used as a sub-fill material in the construction industry and in the production of grout. In 2007, 63,000 tonnes of ash from the station, along with 100,000 tonnes of ash from the Ash Lagoons, was taken and recycled. In September 2007, Pulverised Fuel Ash was utilised as a filling material in the capping of Woodhorn Landfill, which had been used for the disposal of spent potlining from the smelter.

=== Biomass usage ===
In December 2003 the Environment Agency granted permission for the plant to co-fire biomass fuels in the station. Since 2004 three different types of biomass fuel been in use at Lynemouth; Sawdust and Wood pellets from FSC certified forests and Olive residues. These fuels are mixed with the coal on the conveyor belt into the power station. In 2004 11,000 tonnes of biomass fuel were used in the station. Biomass conversion ambitions have increased, with the site currently aiming to be 100% biomass fired from 2015.

The station earned the world class OHSAS 18001 health and safety certificate in 2003, ahead of Alcan's global targets. All of the station's staff were required to take place in safety audits to improve working practice at the station. The certificate was presented to the station's manager by Wansbeck MP Denis Murphy on 15 March 2003. The station's attention to health and safety was further recognised on 6 June 2007 when they were honoured by the Royal Society for the Prevention of Accidents (RoSPA) with a RoSPA Occupational Health and Safety Award at the Hilton Birmingham Metropole Hotel. Workers at the station had been audited by RoSPA for 10 years before receiving the award.

=== Coastal defence ===
In late 1994, the power station was flooded to a foot deep of sea water, after a freak high tide and strong winds. This led to a sea defence system being constructed to protect the building. The problems came about because of the temporary closure of Ellington Colliery. Tipped waste from the colliery had been used as a coastal defence measure, but as the colliery had closed, waste was no longer being tipped. The colliery was reopened by RJB Mining, and in July 1999 the station ensured the future of the colliery by signing a contract with RJB Mining to be provided with 3,000,000 tonnes of coal from Ellington Colliery and opencast mines in Northumberland, over the course of three years. The colliery closed for good in 2005, leading to problems with coastal defence again, threatening the station's coal stocking area. This required a £2.5 million new coastal defence scheme be put in place, involving the use of large rocks as a defence wall.

== Environmental impact ==
The power station's use of biomass since 2004 has been part of an attempt to reduce its carbon dioxide (CO_{2}) output. In 2002 and 2004 the station met its targets for reduction in greenhouse gas emissions. Despite this, in 2006 the power station was revealed as having the fourth highest CO_{2} emissions in the north of England, for producing 2,685,512 tonnes of CO_{2} per year. Generally the station reduced its CO_{2} emissions by 65% between 1990 and 2010, and the local air quality meets UK and European standards. However, some of its wood has been linked to unsustainable sources, including threatened longleaf pine from the southeast US.

== Windfarms ==
In 2006 a proposal was made by Hawthorn Power, an offshoot of UK Coal, to construct three 110 m (360 ft) tall wind turbines on an unused part of the station's coal sorting area, north of the power station. Permission was granted for the turbines in February 2008. In July 2010, it was revealed that the project's new developer, Clipper Windpower, would be using the site to erect the country's first super-efficient wind turbines, called Liberty Wind Turbine. However, this meant the height of the turbines would increase from 110 m (360 ft) to 130 m (430 ft). Each turbine would have a rating of 2.5 MW, but only three turbines would be built. The wind farm would produce enough electricity to provide power for 1,690 houses. One turbine is expected to be erected initially, while environmental issues are assessed.

ScottishPower Renewables also have permission to build 13 wind turbines near the aluminium smelter. They were initially refused planning permission, which they submitted in November 2006. This was because their site is spread over two council boundaries and Wansbeck Council approved the scheme, but Castle Morpeth refused. An appeal hearing was given in April 2008, and permission was eventually granted in January 2009 for the construction of up to 13 turbines, producing 30 MW of electricity.

== Future of the station ==
Following a visit to the station by Prime Minister Gordon Brown on 3 July 2009, it became apparent that Rio Tinto Alcan were hoping to be able to demonstrate Carbon Capture and Storage (CCS) technology at the station in the future, using "pre-combustion" CCS technology. This would have involved treating the coal prior to burning so that less CO_{2} was produced, with any remaining CO_{2} being pumped under the North Sea into an aquifer. However, due to the economic climate, Rio Tinto did not commit the funding for the project themselves, and did not secure any of the required £1 billion European Union funding available for demonstration of CCS technology. In November 2009 it was announced that a variety of energy experts were preparing for the £1 billion bid to the Government for investment. The plans included a pipeline into the North Sea, and the upgrading of one of the station's generating sets from 140 MW to around 375 MW, to safeguard the supply of electricity to the aluminium smelter.

The European Commission (EC) claimed that Alcan is in breach of their operating licence as the station has failed to "significantly reduce its emissions". The UK Government contested the allegations, as the power station and smelter combined then provided 650 jobs and a contribution of £100,000,000 to the local economy, in an area heavily affected by the loss of traditional heavy industry. They lost the court case over it and on 22 April 2010, the European Court of Justice ruled that the plant was subject to the emission limit values of the European directive on Large Combustion Plants. As a consequence, the station has to have at least £200 million worth of adaptations made to it so that it conforms to the directive, or be shut down. A date has not yet been given for it to conform, but two options for saving the station are the CCS project, or a switch from coal to biomass as a fuel.

Lynemouth's future came further under threat in March 2011, following carbon cutting measures announced in the 2011 United Kingdom budget. The government's plans meant that the station would cost an extra £40 million a year, erasing Rio Tinto Alcan's profits on the station. This has made the station's operators consider the option of converting the power station to operate on biomass only to avoid the penalties. However, this conversion itself would cost €400 million and then using biomass instead of coal would cost an additional £170 million a year. Nevertheless, as of 2024 the plant runs fully on wood biomass.

== Cultural use and visual impact ==
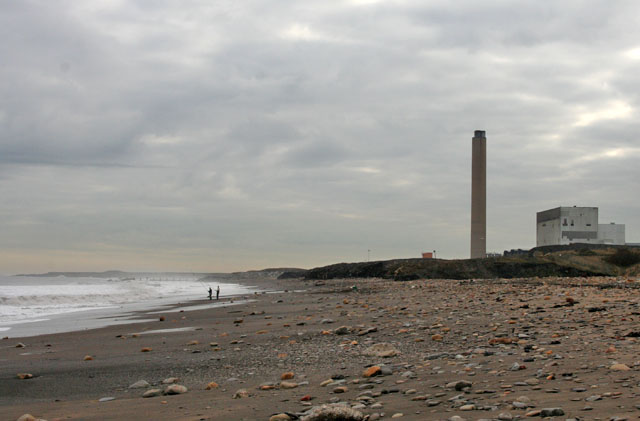
Lynemouth power station's 370 ft (110 m) tall chimney can be seen over a 16 mi (26 km) stretch of the Northumberland coast.

Since its construction, the station has made appearances in a small number of films shot locally. These include:

- Seacoal – a film made by Amber Films in 1985. The station is features heavily as a backdrop in the beach scenes, where the characters are working, collecting seacoal. Photographer Mik Critchlow (who would later become involved with Amber Films' sister company Side Gallery) also documented the seacoalers at Lynemouth, between 1981 and 1983. He also used the power station as an industrial backdrop to some of his images.
- Billy Elliot – a 2000 film directed by Stephen Daldry. The power station and the smelter both feature as an industrial backdrop in the film's cemetery scenes. The power station's coal sorting area is used to represent a colliery.

The chimney of the power station is a strong landmark on the local coastline, and can be seen over a 25-kilometre (16 mi) stretch of coast, from Cresswell down to South Shields pier.

== See also ==
- List of power stations in England
- Energy use and conservation in the United Kingdom
