= History of parliamentary constituencies and boundaries in Northumberland =

The county of Northumberland has returned four MPs to the UK Parliament since 1983. Under the 2023 review of Westminster constituencies, coming into effect for the 2024 general election, the boundary commission proposed that two of the four constituencies be shared with the county of Tyne and Wear.

Under the Local Government Act 1972, which came into effect on 1 April 1974, the boundaries of the historic/administrative county were significantly altered with the south-east of the county, comprising more than half the electorate, being transferred to the new metropolitan county of Tyne and Wear. These changes were reflected in the following redistribution of parliamentary seats which did not come into effect until the 1983 general election, resulting in a reduction in the county's representation from 10 to 4 MPs.

== Number of seats ==
The table below shows the number of MPs representing Northumberland at each major redistribution of seats affecting the county.

Year	County seats^{1}	Borough seats^{1}	Total
Historic County
Prior to 1832	2	6	8
1832-1885	4	6	10
1885-1918	4	4	8
1918-1950	3	7	10
1950-1974	3	7	10
Current County
1974-1983^{2}	3	1	4
1983–2024	3	1	4
2024–present^{3}	4	–	4

^{1}Prior to 1950, seats were classified as County Divisions or Parliamentary Boroughs. Since 1950, they have been classified as County or Borough Constituencies.

^{2}Approximate equivalent number of constituencies. Prior to the redistribution coming into effect for the 1983 general election, two constituencies were split between Northumberland and Tyne and Wear and two were wholly within the reconfigured county.

^{3}Includes two cross-county border constituencies shared with Tyne and Wear.

== Constituencies timeline ==
County seat Borough seat

Constituency	Prior to 1832	1832-1885	1885-1918	1918-1950	1950-1974	1974-1983	1983–2024	2024–present
Northumberland	1290-1832 (2 MPs)							
North Northumberland		1832-1885 (2 MPs)						2024–present
Berwick-upon-Tweed	1512-1885 (2 MPs)		1885–2024					
Morpeth	1553-1832 (2 MPs)	1832-1950			1950-1983			
South Northumberland		1832-1885 (2 MPs)						
Wansbeck			1885-1950				1983–2024	
Blyth and Ashington								2024–present
Blyth Valley							1983–2024	
Blyth					1950-1983			
Cramlington and Killingworth (part)								2024–present
Hexham (part from 2024)			1885–present					
Tynemouth and North Shields		1832-1885				Part of Tyne and Wear from 1974		
Tynemouth			1885→			Part of Tyne and Wear from 1974		
Tyneside			1885-1918			Part of Tyne and Wear from 1974		
Wallsend				1918→		Part of Tyne and Wear from 1974		
Newcastle upon Tyne	1283-1918 (2 MPs)					Part of Tyne and Wear from 1974		
Newcastle upon Tyne East				1918→		Part of Tyne and Wear from 1974		
Newcastle upon Tyne North				1918→		Part of Tyne and Wear from 1974		
Newcastle upon Tyne West				1918→		Part of Tyne and Wear from 1974		
Newcastle upon Tyne Central				1918→		Part of Tyne and Wear from 1974		

== Boundary reviews ==
=== Prior to 1832 ===
Since 1290, the parliamentary county of Northumberland, along with all other English counties regardless of size or population, had elected two MPs (knights of the shire) to the House of Commons.

The county also included three parliamentary boroughs, namely Berwick-upon-Tweed, Morpeth and Newcastle upon Tyne, all returning two MPs (burgesses) each.

=== 1832 ===
The Reform Act 1832 radically changed the representation of the House of Commons, with the county being divided into the Northern and Southern Divisions, both returning two MPs. The representation of Morpeth, which included the parish of Bedlington, was reduced to one MP. Tynemouth was established as a single-member Borough - named Tynemouth and North Shields under the Parliamentary Boundaries Act 1832.

=== 1868 ===
Under the Boundary Act 1868, the boundaries of Morpeth were further extended to include the townships of Cowpen and Newsham (which incorporprated the town of Blyth). There were no other changes.

=== 1885 ===
Under the Redistribution of Seats Act 1885, the two two-member county divisions were replaced by four single-member constituencies, namely Berwick-upon-Tweed, Wansbeck, Hexham and Tyneside. The Parliamentary Borough of Berwick-upon-Tweed was abolished. Tynemouth and North Shields became known as Tynemouth, with no changes to its boundaries.

=== 1918 ===
Under the Representation of the People Act 1918, the number of constituencies in Northumberland was increased back up to 10 as the two-member borough of Newcastle upon Tyne was replaced by four Divisions – Central, East, North and West.

The County Division of Tyneside was abolished and its contents distributed as follows:

- the majority of the electorate, comprising the municipal borough of Wallsend and the urban districts of Gosforth, Longbenton and Weetslade formed the new Parliamentary Borough of Wallsend;
- the former urban districts of Walker, and Benwell and Fenham which had been abolished in 1904 and absorbed into the County Borough of Newcastle upon Tyne were included in Newcastle upon Tyne East and West respectively; and
- the urban district of Newburn and surrounding rural areas were transferred to Wansbeck.

Elsewhere, Berwick-upon-Tweed gained Amble from Wansbeck and Rothbury from Hexham, and Ashington was transferred from Wansbeck to Morpeth.

=== 1950 ===
As a result of the redistribution enacted by the Representation of the People Act 1948, Northumberland's representation remained at 10 MPs.

A new borough constituency named Blyth was established, which included the towns of Blyth and Bedlington, previously part of Morpeth. Wansbeck was abolished with its contents distributed as follows:

- rural areas around Morpeth, including Newbiggin-by-the-Sea, to Morpeth;
- Seaton Valley urban district (incorporating Cramlington, Seghill, Earsdon and Seaton Delaval) to Blyth;
- Whitley Bay to Tynemouth;
- rural areas to the west of Newcastle upon Tyne to Hexham; and
- Newburn to Newcastle upon Tyne West – necessitating the redrawing of the boundaries of the other three Newcastle upon Tyne seats.

=== 1955 ===
There was only one change resulting from the First Periodic Review of Westminster constituencies – the transfer of Benwell ward from Newcastle upon Tyne West to Newcastle upon Tyne Central.

=== 1974 (Feb) ===
There were no changes resulting from the Second Periodic Review, which came into effect for the February 1974 election.

=== 1974 (Apr) ===
Shortly after the Second Periodic Review came into effect, the county was subject to a major reconfiguration under the terms of the Local Government Act 1972. As a result, with effect from 1 April 1974, the four Newcastle upon Tyne constituencies and those of Wallsend and Tynemouth, (Note: Apart from the small community of Seaton Sluice.) together with small areas of Hexham and Blyth, became part of the metropolitan county of Tyne and Wear.

=== 1983 ===
The next change to parliamentary constituency boundaries, following the recommendations of the Third Periodic Review, reflected the change in county boundaries and reorganisation of local government authorities in 1974. This review did not come into effect for a further nine years, at the 1983 general election, and resulted in the following changes:

- Morpeth was abolished and, with the exception of northern rural areas which were transferred to Berwick-upon-Tweed, its contents formed the bulk of the re-established constituency of Wansbeck (which had very little in common with the original constituency);
- Blyth was renamed Blyth Valley, with Bedlington being included in Wansbeck; and
- the small areas of Blyth (Earsdon and Backworth) and Hexham (part of Castle Ward rural district) which had been absorbed into the new county of Tyne and Wear were transferred to Wallsend and Newcastle upon Tyne North respectively.

=== 1997 ===
There were no changes under the Fourth Review.

=== 2010 ===
At the Fifth Review there were only minor changes due to the revision of local authority ward boundaries.

=== 2024 ===
For the 2023 periodic review of Westminster constituencies, which redrew the constituency map ahead of the 2024 general election, the Boundary Commission for England opted to combine Northumberland with the Tyne and Wear boroughs of Newcastle upon Tyne and North Tyneside as a sub-region of the North East Region, with the creation of two cross-county boundary constituencies, resulting in the abolition of Berwick-upon-Tweed, Blyth Valley and Wansbeck.

Detailed changes were as follows:

- Berwick-upon-Tweed was combined with the town of Morpeth in the Wansbeck constituency to form the re-established seat of North Northumberland.
- The rest of Wansbeck was combined with the town of Blyth in the Blyth Valley constituency to form Blyth and Ashington.
- The rest of Blyth Valley was combined with northern-most areas of Tyne and Wear, including the communities of Killingworth, Shiremoor and Wideopen, to form the cross-county boundary seat of Cramlington and Killingworth.
- Hexham was retained, but expanded to include western-most parts of Newcastle-upon-Tyne, including Throckley and Newburn.

== Maps ==
1885-1918

1918-1950

1955-1983
1983-2010

2010-2024

2024-present

== Communities timeline ==
The table below shows which constituencies represented major communities within the current county from 1885 onwards.

Town	1885-1918	1918-1950	1950-1983	1983-2024	2024-present
Alnwick	Berwick-upon-Tweed				North Northumberland
Amble	Wansbeck	Berwick-upon-Tweed			North Northumberland
Ashington	Wansbeck	Morpeth		Wansbeck	Blyth and Ashington
Bedlington	Morpeth			Wansbeck	Blyth and Ashington
Berwick-upon-Tweed	Berwick-upon-Tweed				North Northumberland
Blyth	Morpeth		Blyth	Blyth Valley	Blyth and Ashington
Cramlington	Wansbeck		Blyth	Blyth Valley	Cramlington and Killingworth
Hexham	Hexham				
Morpeth	Morpeth			Wansbeck	North Northumberland
Newbiggin-by-the-Sea	Wansbeck		Morpeth	Wansbeck	Blyth and Ashington
Ponteland	Wansbeck		Hexham		
Prudhoe	Hexham				
Rothbury	Hexham	Berwick-upon-Tweed			North Northumberland
Seaton Delaval	Wansbeck		Blyth	Blyth Valley	Cramlington and Killingworth

== See also ==
- List of parliamentary constituencies in Northumberland
- History of parliamentary constituencies and boundaries in Tyne and Wear
