= Mik Critchlow =

British photographer (1955–2023)

- Born: 7 March 1955; Ashington, England
- Died: 7 March 2023 (aged 68)
- Known for: Documentary photography
- Website: www.mikcritchlow.com

Mik Critchlow (7 March 1955 – 7 March 2023) was a British social documentary and portrait photographer who made work about North East England, in particular about his home town of Ashington. A book of this work was published in 2019 and he had a solo exhibition at Woodhorn museum in 2021/22. Critchlow's work is held in the collection of Amber Film & Photography Collective.

== Life and work ==
Critchlow was born and lived in Ashington, Northumberland. His grandfather worked as a coal miner there for 52 years and Critchlow's father was a coal miner. He left school aged 15.

Beginning in 1977, he worked for decades on a long-term documentary photography project about Ashington, chronicling social change, including with its coal mining. An exhibition and book, Coal Town, depicted "the colliery and the people who worked there before and after the mine was closed." He also photographed the harsh way of life of people collecting seacoal from the beach near Lynemouth power station, close to Ashington.

== Death ==
Critchlow died on 7 March 2023, on his 68th birthday.

== Publications ==
- Seamen – The NUS Strike 1988 – 1989: Photographs by Mik Critchlow. Black Diamond, 2013. Edition of 200 copies.
- Hirst. Manchester: Buddleia / Morpeth: Bait (Museums Northumberland), 2018. With a foreword by Andrea Hawkins. Edition of 500 copies.
- Coal Town. Liverpool: Bluecoat, 2019. With a foreword by Derek Smith.

== Solo exhibitions ==
- Coal Town, Woodhorn, Ashington, 2021/22

== Collections ==
- Amber Film & Photography Collective, Newcastle upon Tyne
