= Lynemouth Colliery =

Coal mine in England

- Country: England
- Location: Lynemouth, Northumberland
- Coordinates: 55.201976472°N 1.53966901564°W
- Status: Demolished
- Commission date: 1927
- Decommission date: 1994
- Owners: Ashington Coal Company Ltd. (1927); National Coal Board (1947); British Coal (1986)

Lynemouth Colliery was a coal mine in Lynemouth, Northumberland, England. It was in operation between 1927 and 1994. According to Historic England, "it was one of Britain's largest collieries until it was closed due to an underground fire". The colliery was demolished in 2005.

Its number 1 pit was the downcast, and its number 2 was the upcast.

In 1960, the mine employed 1,734 people (1,390 above ground, 344 below).
