= Ian Lavery =

British politician (born 1963)

Ian Lavery MP
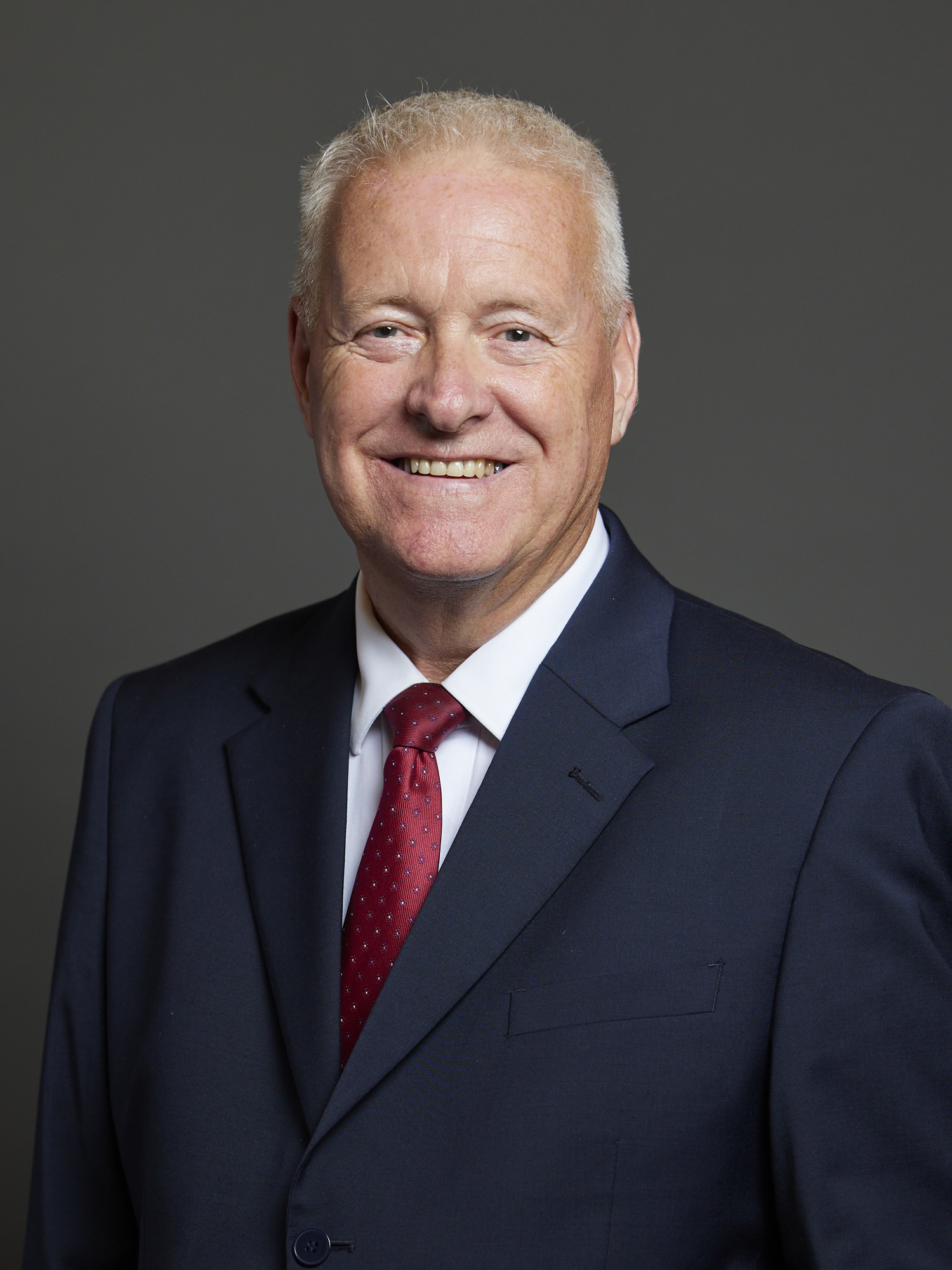
- Official portrait, 2024

Chair of the Labour Party
- In office 14 June 2017 – 5 April 2020
- Leader: Jeremy Corbyn
- Preceded by: Tom Watson
- Succeeded by: Angela Rayner

Labour Party Co-National Campaign Coordinator
- In office 10 February 2017 – 5 April 2020 Serving with Andrew Gwynne
- Leader: Jeremy Corbyn
- Preceded by: Jon Trickett
- Succeeded by: Angela Rayner

Shadow Minister without Portfolio
- In office 9 February 2017 – 5 April 2020
- Leader: Jeremy Corbyn
- Preceded by: Andrew Gwynne
- Succeeded by: Conor McGinn (2021)

Shadow Minister for the Cabinet Office
- In office 7 October 2016 – 9 February 2017
- Leader: Jeremy Corbyn
- Preceded by: Tom Watson
- Succeeded by: Jon Trickett

Shadow Minister for Trade Unions and Civil Society
- In office 18 September 2015 – 7 October 2016
- Leader: Jeremy Corbyn
- Preceded by: Lisa Nandy (Civil Society)
- Succeeded by: Steve Reed (Civil Society)

Member of Parliament for Blyth and Ashington Wansbeck (2010–2024)
- Incumbent
- Assumed office 6 May 2010
- Preceded by: Denis Murphy
- Majority: 9,173 (22.7%)

President of the National Union of Mineworkers
- In office 2002–2010
- Preceded by: Arthur Scargill
- Succeeded by: Nicky Wilson

Personal details
- Born: 6 January 1963 (age 63) Ashington, Northumberland, England
- Party: Labour
- Other political affiliations: Socialist Campaign Group
- Spouse: Hilary Baird (m. 1986)
- Children: 2
- Education: New College Durham
- Website: www.ianlavery.co.uk

Ian Lavery (born 6 January 1963) is a British Labour Party politician who has served as Member of Parliament (MP) for Blyth and Ashington from 2024. He was previously the MP for Wansbeck from 2010 to 2024. Lavery served as the chair of the Labour Party under Jeremy Corbyn from 2017 to 2020, and was the president of the National Union of Mineworkers from 2002 to 2010. He is a member of the Socialist Campaign Group parliamentary caucus.

== Early life and education ==
Ian Lavery was born on 6 January 1963 in Ashington, Northumberland to parents John Robert Lavery and his wife, Patricia. After leaving East School, Lavery began a Youth Training Scheme before working in the construction industry. Following a recruitment campaign by the National Coal Board, he started work at the Lynemouth colliery in January 1980. In July 1980, Lavery started a mining craft apprenticeship, transferring to Ellington Colliery in 1981 and attended New College Durham, receiving a Higher National Certificate in mining engineering.

== Early political career ==
In 1986, Lavery was elected onto the National Union of Mineworkers (NUM) committee at Ellington Colliery as compensation secretary. Later, he was voted on to the Northumberland Executive Committee, and then on to the North East Area Executive Committee. He has said that because of his union activity, he was barred by management from completing his Higher National Diploma qualification:

I was the only one in the whole of the North East Area who had completed the HNC who wasn't given that opportunity. I went to see the manager, not that I would have gone by the way, and he said that they didn't think I would be interested. I asked him if he had thought to ask me, and he said no, not really, and he was smiling as he said it.

After serving as first cabinet chair of Wansbeck District Council, Lavery was appointed general secretary of the Northumberland area through the NUM. In 1992, Lavery stood for the national executive committee of the NUM. In the subsequent ballot, he was elected in the first round having gained more than 50% of the vote. When Arthur Scargill stood down as NUM president in August 2002, Lavery was elected unopposed to replace him.

== Parliamentary career ==
=== First term (2010–2015) ===
In February 2010, Lavery became the prospective parliamentary candidate for the Labour Party for Wansbeck. At the 2010 general election, Lavery was elected as MP for Wansbeck with 45.9% of the vote and a majority of 7,031.

He was appointed as Parliamentary Private Secretary to deputy leader Harriet Harman, but resigned in 2012 after breaking the party whip by levelling an amendment to exempt prison staff and psychiatric workers from a general public sector increase in the pension age to 68. In December 2012, he said that miners with criminal charges related to the Battle of Orgreave should have them struck. In the same month, he said in Parliament that he had been given a copy of a suicide note written by a constituent who had died of suicide after being told he was no longer eligible for state support.

In March 2014, Lavery posed with one of his sons who had blackened his face to look like Michael Jackson at a fancy dress party. According to the Daily Mail, some of Lavery's constituents said they found it offensive.

=== Second term (2015–2017) ===
At the 2015 general election, Lavery was re-elected as MP for Wansbeck with an increased vote share of 50% and an increased majority of 10,881. After Ed Miliband resigned as leader of the Labour Party, Lavery supported Andy Burnham in the subsequent leadership election which was won by Jeremy Corbyn. In September 2015, Corbyn appointed him shadow minister for trade unions and civil society.

In 2016, it was reported that Lavery had received £165,387 from the NUM, the union he had run. A union fund provided him a loan of £72,500 to buy a house in 1994, which was written off in 2003 when Lavery was NUM president. He kept £18,000 returned by an endowment fund he had paid into to repay the cost of the house, and received £89,887.83 in termination payments from the union. He paid back £15,000 of the redundancy payment. Allegations of impropriety were examined by the Trades Union Certification Officer, who in 2017 found that there were no documents detailing the process or decision about Lavery's redundancy, so no investigation followed.

Lavery was appointed as Labour's national campaign co-ordinator, serving jointly with Andrew Gwynne in February 2017.

=== Third and fourth terms (2017–2024) ===
At the snap 2017 general election, Lavery was again re-elected, with an increased vote share of 57.3% and a decreased majority of 10,435. In June 2017, Lavery was appointed to the role of chair of the Labour Party. In the same month, he was criticised for saying that Labour was "too broad a church".

In December 2018, Lavery raised in parliament the high insurance premiums of his constituents living near the River Wansbeck in the wake of the 2015–16 Great Britain and Ireland floods. In the same month, he opposed Jeremy Corbyn's move to support a second referendum on Brexit, reportedly saying that if Labour supported a second referendum on the UK's membership of the European Union, the party would lose the next general election.

At the 2019 general election, Lavery was again re-elected, with a decreased vote share of 42.3% and a decreased majority of 814.

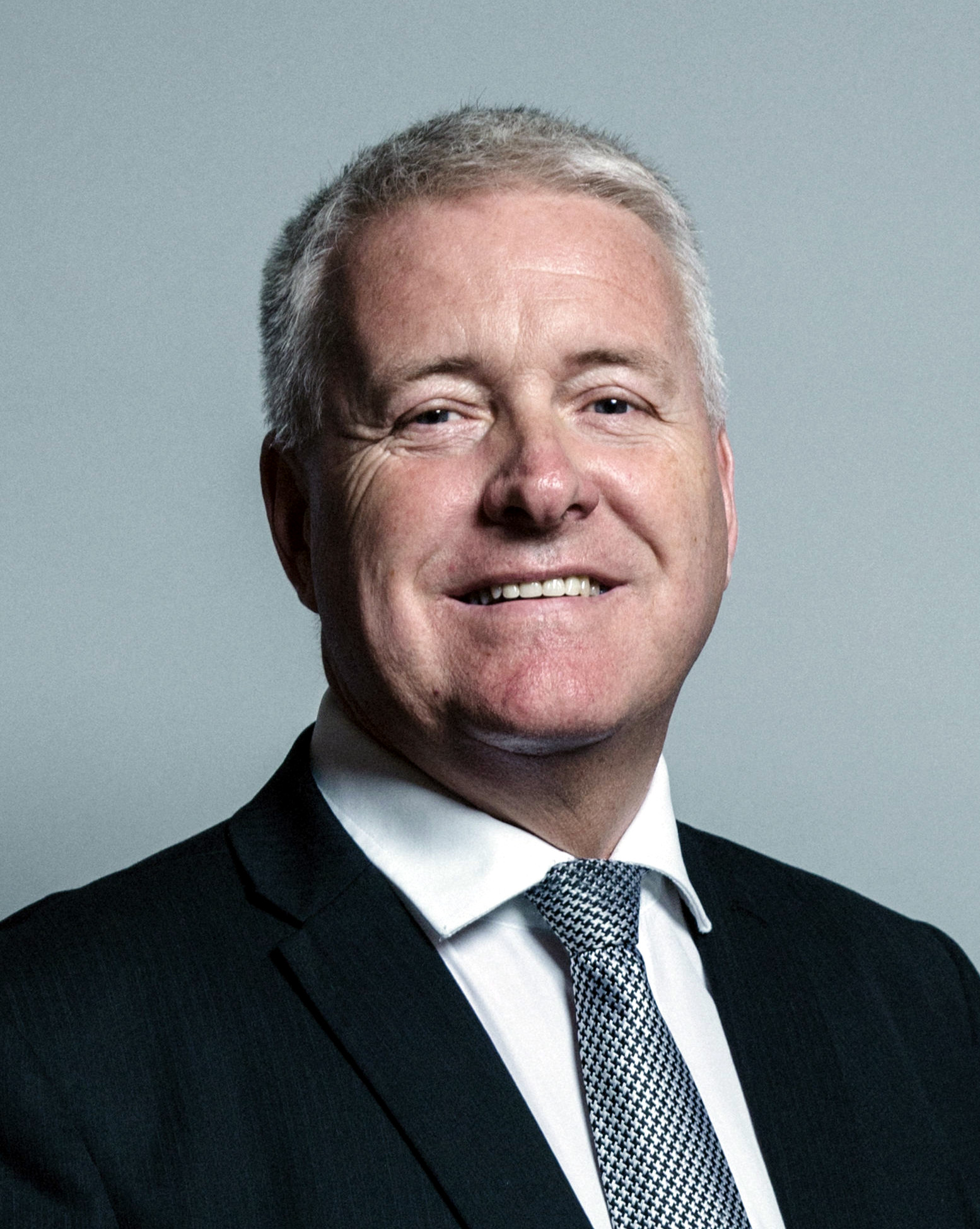
Lavery in 2017

In January 2021, Lavery was criticised after he questioned why anyone would have faith in the COVID-19 vaccine and expressed concern about the time it took to approve the vaccine. In a statement, Lavery said that his words had been taken out of context.

On 24 February 2022, following the Russian invasion of Ukraine, Lavery was one of 11 Labour MPs threatened with losing the party whip after they signed a statement by the Stop the War Coalition which questioned the legitimacy of NATO and accused the military alliance of "eastward expansion". All 11 MPs subsequently removed their signatures after being threatened with suspension from the party.

=== 2024 to present ===
He was elected MP for Blyth and Ashington at the 2024 general election. On 8 May 2026, he called on Keir Starmer to resign following the 2026 United Kingdom local elections.

== Personal life ==
Lavery married Hilary Baird in 1986, aged 23, at the Holy Sepulchre Church in Ashington. The couple have two sons, Ian Junior, born 1988 and Liam, born 1993. Liam was a town councillor for the college ward of Ashington and had been an activist in the Labour Party since his early teens.

Lavery is a trustee of CISWO in the North East area, Northumberland Aged Mineworkers' Homes Association, Woodhorn Colliery Museum and Buzz Learning Disability; he is a patron of Headway for South East Northumberland and Wansbeck Disability Forum. He is also chair and trustee of Pitmen Painters, which reached international acclaim following the release of the West End play of the same name, and which follows a story about the formation of the Northumberland-based organisation.

Trade union offices
Preceded by Arthur Scargill	President of the National Union of Mineworkers; 2002–2010	Succeeded by Nicky Wilson
Parliament of the United Kingdom
Preceded by Denis Murphy	Member of Parliament for Wansbeck; 2010–2024	Constituency abolished
New constituency	Member of Parliament for Blyth and Ashington; 2024–present	Incumbent
Political offices
Preceded by Tom Watson	Shadow Minister for the Cabinet Office; 2016–2017	Succeeded by Jon Trickett
Preceded by Andrew Gwynne	Shadow Minister without Portfolio; 2017–2020	Succeeded by Conor McGinn
Party political offices
Preceded by Tom Watson	Chair of the Labour Party; 2017–2020	Succeeded by Angela Rayner
