= Robert Mason (Liberal politician) =

British politician

Robert Mason (17 December 1857 – 1 August 1927) was a British Liberal Party politician.

== Family ==
Mason was born at Belford in Northumberland. In 1884, he married Rosa Elizabeth Thompson and they had two sons and three daughters. Their home was Marden House in Whitley Bay.

== Career ==
Mason was a shipping agent and shipowner by profession. He was also an Alderman of Northumberland County Council and a justice of the peace.

== Politics ==
Mason was selected to fight the Wansbeck constituency at a by-election on 28 May 1918 as a supporter of the Coalition government of David Lloyd George. He was opposed by Ebenezer "Ebby Edwards" for the Labour Party and won the seat by a majority of 547 votes. He stood again as a Coalition Liberal at the 1918 general election having presumably been awarded the Coalition coupon. In another straight fight against Labour he held the seat, this time with a majority of 3,399. By this time the electorate was greatly increased thanks to the Representation of the People Act 1918.

Mason retired from the House of Commons at the 1922 election, and did not stand again.

Parliament of the United Kingdom
Preceded by Charles Fenwick	Member of Parliament for Wansbeck; 1918–1922	Succeeded by George Warne
