= Jack Thompson (politician) =

British politician

Member of Parliament for Wansbeck
- In office 9 June 1983 – 8 April 1997
- Preceded by: New constituency
- Succeeded by: Denis Murphy

Personal details
- Born: 27 August 1928
- Died: 21 July 2011 (aged 82)
- Party: Labour

John Thompson DL (27 August 1928 – 21 July 2011), known as Jack Thompson, was a British Labour Party politician - the Member of Parliament for Wansbeck from 1983 to 1997. Thompson had a lasting achievement to thwart a plan for a nuclear power station on the long and sandy Druridge Bay, east of Widdrington in the county, one of the leading beaches of Northumberland.

== Early life ==
Jack Thompson was the son of a clerk. After leaving Bothal School he worked at a local coal mine (Note: in then colloquial language, and occasionally in Board publications, referred to as pits.), completing his education at Ashington Mining College. He became an electrical engineer, and shift charge engineer at Ellington Colliery.

== Local politics ==
Thompson was an undemonstrative leftwinger, described by one of the Conservative candidates he defeated as an "absolute gentleman" and became a party whip for seven years.

He joined the Labour Party in 1960, and from 1965 was secretary/agent in his constituency. He was elected to Newbiggin council in 1970, and Wansbeck Council which incorporated it in 1974; the same year he became a county councillor. In 1978 he was elected leader of Northumberland County Council Labour group, and when the party took control in 1981 he became council leader, implementing many changes and increasing its effectiveness.

Thompson saw the Druridge Bay project as a threat to the environment as well as to the coal industry, and was alarmed that a pressurised water reactor — which he considered unsafe — was under consideration by the Central Electricity Generating Board. He therefore persuaded the council to campaign against PWRs as such. It was 1987 before he secured a promise from Lord Marshall, chairman of the CEGB, that there would not be a PWR at Druridge Bay; even then he was unconvinced.

== National Politics ==
When the Wansbeck constituency was created at the 1983 election George Grant, MP for Morpeth, had a better claim as Morpeth forms its largest town, but stood down through ill health: this prompted Thompson to a successful nomination, upon which he planned to resign as council leader if elected the new MP. He accomplished this on being elected with 47% of local support in a three-party contest, bolstered by sponsorship from the mineworkers’ union.

At Westminster, he co-sponsored the Commons motion against narcotic glue sniffing, a problem then growing in schools, attacked "diktats" from Whitehall which he said were destroying local government, and repeatedly criticised the Conservative government's "squeeze" on education funding.

During the UK miners' strike (1984–1985) he argued that some pit closures were due to bad management. In November 1984 he joined MPs from the hard-left Left Campaign Group in a demonstration that forced suspension of the chamber's sitting, over deductions from supplementary benefit for striking miners’ dependants.

When the poll tax was first proposed, Thompson warned ministers that while the rating system was unfair, the community charge would be worse — and uncollectable.

Thompson's local government experience led to his appointment to the Education, Science and Arts Select Committee for two years from 1985.

Before the 1987 election he told Margaret Thatcher her government was "totally ignorant" about the depressed economic situation in the north. He later critiqued the "absolute folly" of breaking up the electricity industry prior to privatisation, campaigned against a planned toxic waste plant at North Blyth, and criticised Northumbria's ambulance service for opting out of NHS control without consultation.

In 1990 Neil Kinnock appointed Thompson as Labour's whip for the northern county MPs. In 1991 he told the Employment Secretary that his decision to put an extra £120 million into training programmes meant little compared with £1 billion taken out of the training budget over the previous three years. He retired from the Commons in 1997.

International Committees

From 1989, Thompson was a delegate to the Council of Europe and the Western European Union. He chaired the Council's Fisheries subcommittee, and the WEU's rules and privileges committee.

== Personal life ==
Jackie Milburn, a prized Newcastle United footballer, was a cousin. Jack Thompson married Margaret Clarke in 1952 with whom he had two children.

== Notes and references ==
Notes

References

- Times Guide to the House of Commons 1992

Parliament of the United Kingdom
New constituency	Member of Parliament for Wansbeck; 1983–1997	Succeeded by Denis Murphy
