= Bernard Cruddas =

British politician

Bernard Cruddas MP

Member of Parliament for Wansbeck
- In office 1931–1940
- Preceded by: George William Shield
- Succeeded by: Donald Scott

Personal details
- Born: 1 January 1882
- Died: 23 December 1959 (aged 77)

Military service
- Allegiance: United Kingdom
- Branch/service: British Army
- Rank: Lieutenant Colonel
- Battles/wars: First World War

Lieutenant Colonel Bernard Cruddas DSO (1 January 1882 – 23 December 1959) was a British Conservative politician.

Educated at Winchester College, Cruddas was commissioned into the 4th (Militia) Battalion of the North Staffordshire Regiment in July 1899, but the following year transferred to the Regular Army and the Northumberland Fusiliers (later the Royal Northumberland Fusiliers).

He reached the rank of Lieutenant colonel in World War I and was awarded the Distinguished Service Order (DSO) in January 1918.

He was elected as Member of Parliament (MP) for Wansbeck at the 1931 general election, and returned at the 1935 election. He stood down in 1940, and at the Wansbeck by-election on 29 July the Conservative candidate Donald Scott was returned unopposed.

Parliament of the United Kingdom
Preceded by George William Shield	Member of Parliament for Wansbeck; 1931–1940	Succeeded by Donald Scott
