= 1940 Wansbeck by-election =

UK parliamentary by-election

The 1940 Wansbeck by-election was a by-election held in England on 22 July 1940 for the UK House of Commons constituency of Wansbeck in Northumberland.

== Vacancy ==
The seat became vacant when the Conservative Member of Parliament (MP) Bernard Cruddas resigned from the House of Commons on 12 July 1940. He had held the seat since the 1931 general election.

== Result ==
The Conservative candidate, Robert Scott, was returned unopposed. He represented the constituency until his defeat at the 1945 general election.

== See also ==
- Wansbeck District
- 1929 Wansbeck by-election
- 1918 Wansbeck by-election
- List of United Kingdom by-elections
