= Lynemouth =

Coordinates: 55.2172°N 1.5354°W

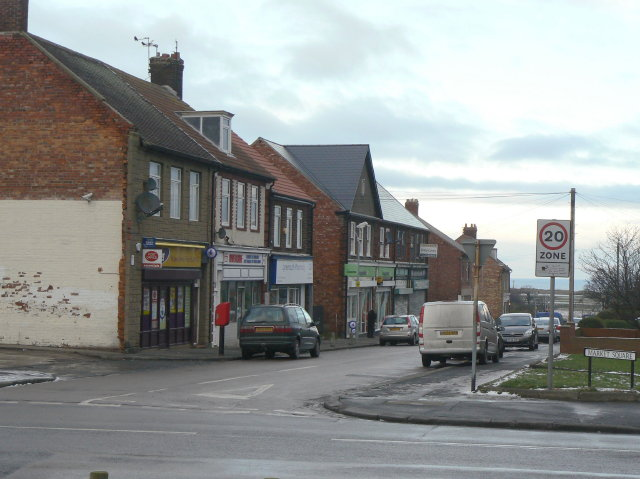
- Market Square, Lynemouth

- Location within Northumberland
- Population: 1,858 (2011 census)
- OS grid reference: NZ295915
- Civil parish: Lynemouth
- Shire county: Northumberland
- Region: North East
- Country: England
- Sovereign state: United Kingdom
- Post town: MORPETH
- Postcode district: NE61
- Police: Northumbria
- Fire: Northumberland
- Ambulance: North East
- UK Parliament: North Northumberland

Lynemouth is a village in Northumberland, England, 3 miles (5 km) northeast of Ashington, close to the village of Ellington to the north west. It was built close to coal mines, including Lynemouth Colliery.

Lynemouth and the surrounding industrial area featured in the 1985 docudrama Seacoal about the seacoalers who made a living from collecting waste coal from the beach. A series of photographs in the Henri Cartier-Bresson Award–winning book In Flagrante (1988) by Chris Killip shows the work and life of the seacoalers; more were published in 2011 in the book Seacoal. (Note: Chris Killip, Seacoal (Göttingen: Steidl, 2011; ISBN 3-86930-256-9).)

To the south of the village is the former Alcan Lynemouth Aluminium Smelter, now closed, and Lynemouth Power Station.

== Governance ==
Lynemouth electoral ward stretches north along the coast to Craster, with a population at the 2011 Census of 4,842.

== Freedom of the Parish ==
The following people and military units have received the Freedom of the Parish of Lynemouth.

=== Individuals ===
- Gillian Thompson: 4 May 2016.
- Sarah Hannah "Sadie" Williamson: 4 May 2016.
- Milburn Irving Douglas: 10 May 2017. (Awarded Posthumously)

== In popular culture ==
The village can be seen in the 2000 film Billy Elliot. Lynemouth Cemetery doubles as Everington Cemetery, in which Elliot's mother is buried. The colliery, demolished in 2005, can be seen in scenes filmed at the cemetery.
