= Donald Scott (politician) =

British politician

Sir Robert Donald Scott (13 November 1901 – 18 June 1974) was a British Conservative Party politician.

== Early life and education ==
Scott was son of timber importer William Scott, of Newcastle-upon-Tyne. He was educated at Mill Hill School and Magdalene College, Cambridge. His father bought him a farm, Caistron, at Thropton, Northumberland, which he farmed from 1926.

== Political career ==
Scott was elected unopposed as Member of Parliament (MP) for Wansbeck in a by-election on 22 July 1940, but at the 1945 general election he lost his seat to Labour's Alf Robens, who won with a majority of over 13,000 votes.

He held office as joint Parliamentary Secretary, Ministry of Agriculture and Fisheries, from May to July 1945.

At the 1950 general election, he was returned to Parliament for the new constituency of Penrith and The Border, where he was re-elected at the 1951 election. He stood down at the 1955 general election, when he was succeeded by the future Deputy Prime Minister William Whitelaw. Scott was knighted in 1955.

== Personal life ==
Scott married Olive Anna Daphne, daughter of J. J. Russell, of Ballygasson House, County Louth. They had two daughters, (Ellenora) Maureen Russell Scott and (Rachel) Mirabel Steel Scott.

Parliament of the United Kingdom
Preceded by Bernard Cruddas	Member of Parliament for Wansbeck; 1940–1945	Succeeded by Alfred Robens
New constituency	Member of Parliament for Penrith and The Border; 1950–1955	Succeeded by William Whitelaw
