= Alcan Lynemouth Aluminium Smelter =

Coordinates: 55.20159°N 1.53963°W

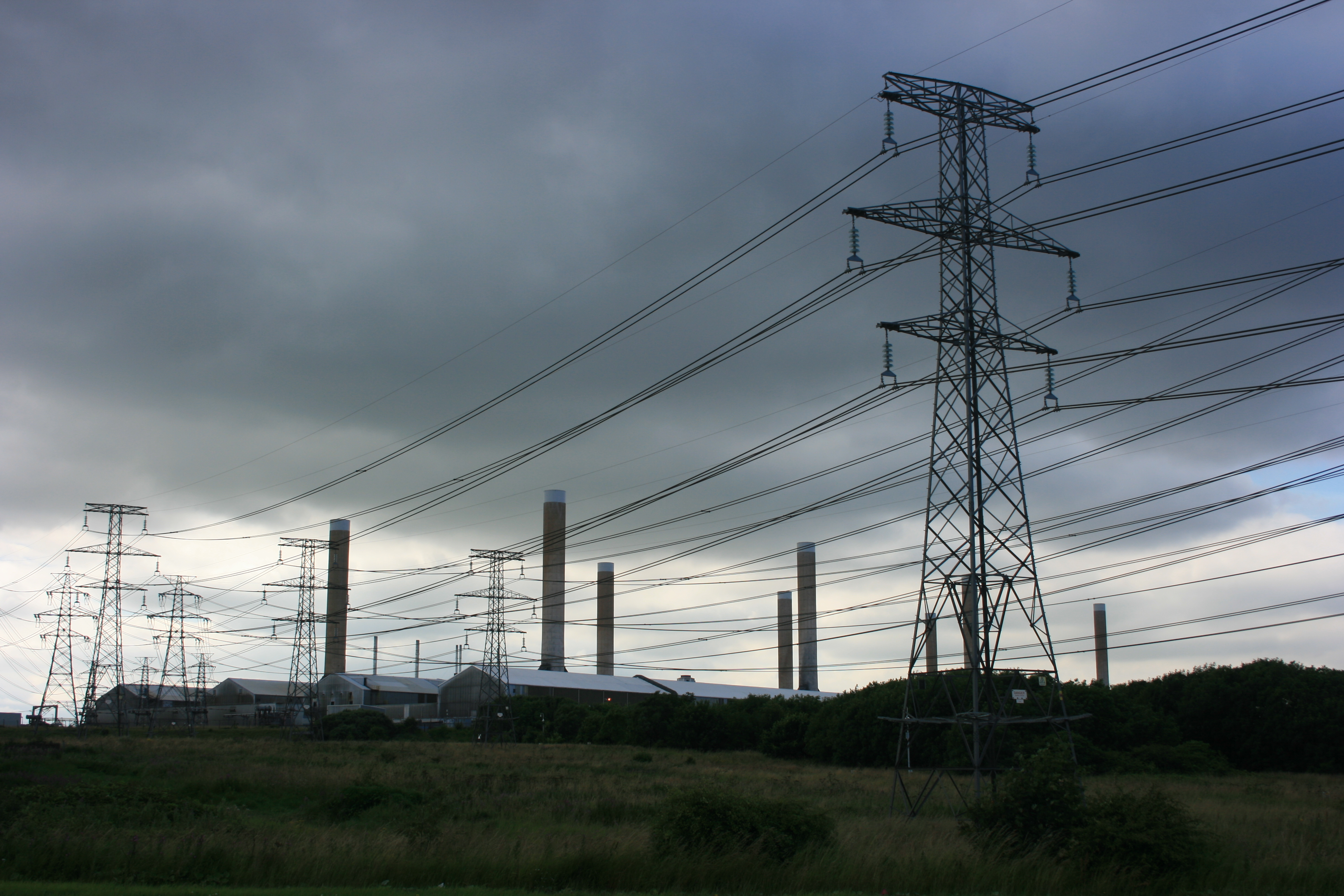
- Alcan Lynemouth Smelter in July 2008
- Interactive map of the Alcan Lynemouth Aluminium Smelter area

General information
- Type: Aluminium smelter
- Location: Lynemouth, Northumberland, North East England
- Inaugurated: 1974
- Demolished: 2018
- Cost: £54 million
- Owner: Alcan

The Alcan Lynemouth Aluminium Smelter was an industrial facility near Ashington, Northumberland, on the coast of North East England, 0.65 mi (1.05 km) south of the village of Lynemouth. The smelter was owned by the Canadian aluminium company Alcan, which is part of Rio Tinto. The smelter was opened in 1974 at a cost, which exceeded its budgeted estimate of £54 million, of $156 million. The plant ceased production in March 2012, and demolition of the facility was completed in March 2018.

== Factors determining the smelter's site ==
A variety of factors determined the smelter's position:

- The first was a source of electric power to smelt the aluminium. One tonne of aluminium requires the same amount of electricity that an average family uses in 20 years, so cheap power was needed. In 1972, Alcan commissioned Lynemouth Power Station, less than 200 m (660 ft) from the smelter's site, to fulfil its power needs. The station's site was convenient for access to the Ellington and Lynemouth coal mines nearby, which were also the fundamental reason for the nearby village's creation. The power station has a 420 megawatt (MW) capacity, more than enough to meet the load requirements of the smelter. The spare electricity is sold to the National Grid.
- Another factor was finding a labour force. Many coal mines in the area had shut down, leaving thousands of people there unemployed. Aluminium smelting is very labour-intensive, but the workforce in the local area was used to heavy work because of working in the mines. The British government also granted £28 million to the company to help reduce unemployment in the area.
- Transport was another major factor as bauxite could not be found in the United Kingdom, only in places such as Jamaica and Australia. The smelter's location had to be near a port with good transport links to the site. The town of Blyth, which is 4 mi (6.4 km) south of the smelter, already had a deep sea port. There was also a railway link from the port going directly to the power station, which was connected to the Alcan facility. The site also has good road links.

== Facts ==
- The smelter had two of the most efficient ring burners in the world, costing around £17 million each.
- The smelter was the only aluminium smelting site in Europe which rebuilt the smelter whilst still in production. It was a 100-day process which took place every seven years.
- The smelter was provided with alumina by two trains a day from Blyth, each consisting of 21 wagons. The alumina was shipped to Blyth from Limerick in the Republic of Ireland.
- Coke was shipped to Blyth from Louisiana in the U.S. and was transported to the smelter by heavy goods vehicles.

== Worries ==
When work started on the site, local farmers were worried that pollution from the smelter would ruin their crops and harm their livestock. To address their concerns, Alcan decided to buy the land from them. Alcan now owns over 4,500 acres (18 km^{2}) of land in the local area and employs a farming director. The land is still used to grow crops and raise livestock.

In early 2005, residents of nearby villages were worried about the fate of the smelter when the only remaining local coal mine, situated at Ellington, closed. However, the smelter did not close and imports its coal from overseas or from mines in other parts of the country.

The emissions of the power plant connected to the smelter were another concern for the environment. In April 2010, the European Court of Justice decided that, contrary to the claim of the UK government, the power plant was subject to the emission limit values laid down in the 2001 Large Combustion Plant Directive. As a consequence, emissions of air polluting substances of the plant had to be reduced.

== Closure ==
Production at the Lynemouth Smelter ended at 14:00 on 29 March 2012, following a 90-day consultation period. It closed in May 2012 putting 515 people out of work and causing a knock-on effect in its local supply chain. Alcan cited rising energy costs due to emerging European environmental legislation as the reason.

The 420MW coal power station continues to operate under new ownership.

In 2015, the site was sold by Rio Tinto to Harworth Estates who plan to turn the site into an 'employment park.' In June 2016, all eight chimneys at the site were demolished and the site had been decommissioned. Demolition of the former smelter was completed in March 2018. The rest of the buildings are now rented to other businesses. It has now been repurposed as a biomass power plant. The area is now a wind farm site.

== See also ==
- British Aluminium
- Anglesey Aluminium
- Lochaber hydroelectric scheme § Fort William Smelter
- List of aluminium smelters
