= Charles Fenwick =

British trade unionist and Liberal-Labour politician

Charles Fenwick c.1895

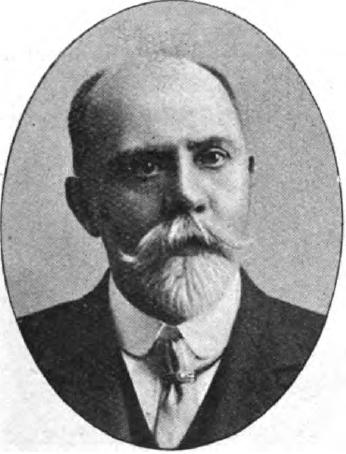
Charles Fenwick c.1905

Charles Fenwick (5 May 1850 – 20 April 1918) was a British trade unionist and Liberal–Labour politician who sat in the House of Commons from 1885 to 1918.

Fenwick was born in Cramlington, Northumberland, and became a coal miner at the age of 10. In 1863 he joined the union and gradually became prominent within the Northumberland Miners' Association, his local union. He also became a Primitive Methodist preacher.

At the 1885 general election, Fenwick was elected as the Lib–Lab Member of Parliament for Wansbeck with a majority of 3,155. He held the seat until his death and made over 500 contributions in the House of Commons.

In 1890, Fenwick was elected Secretary of the Parliamentary Committee of the Trades Union Congress (TUC) – the post which later became the General Secretary. He held the position until 1894, despite being a vociferous opponent of the Eight Hour Bill.

Although Fenwick's union affiliated to the Labour Party in 1907, Fenwick himself refused to join, and remained affiliated to the Liberal Party. Nevertheless, he retained his seat at the two general elections of 1906 (Note: In January 1906, Fenwick was re-elected with a majority of 6,222 (a 70% share of the vote) and was unopposed in the December 1906 election.) on was made a Privy Councillor in 1911. He announced his intention to stand down from Parliament shortly before his death on 20 April 1918, aged 67. Two days later, it was said of Fenwick in a local newspaper report that "he set out in life to improve the condition of the people among whom he was born", and "possessed in a high degree the traits of a Northern miner – common sense, and a love of justice".

== Notes ==
Parliament of the United Kingdom
New constituency	Member of Parliament for Wansbeck; 1885–1918	Succeeded by Robert Mason
Trade union offices
Preceded by Henry Broadhurst	Secretary of the Parliamentary Committee of the TUC; 1890–1894	Succeeded by Sam Woods
