= George Warne =

British politician

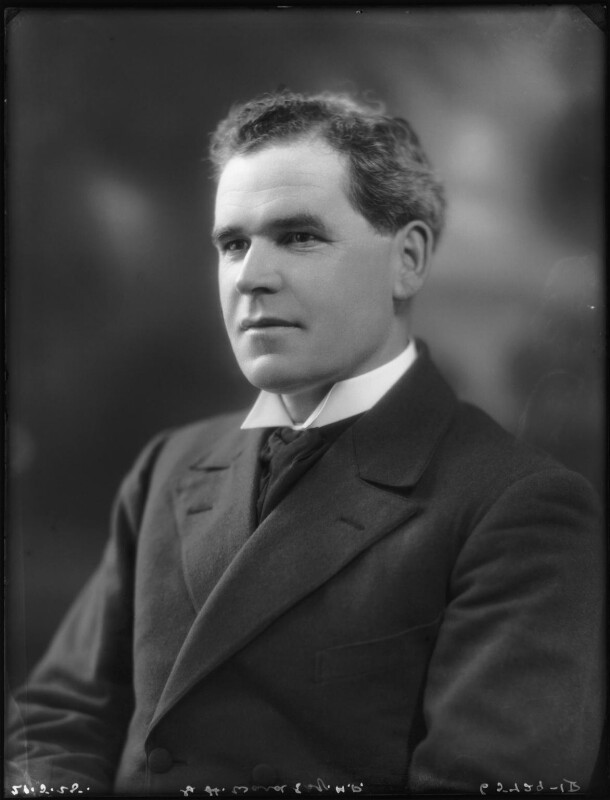
Warne in 1925

George Henry Warne (15 December 1881 – 24 December 1928) was a British Labour Party politician.

Born in Cramlington in Northumberland, Warne began working in a coal mine at the age of twelve. He became active in the Northumberland Miners' Association, and was elected as one of its trustees. He was also president of the Northumberland and Durham Miners' Approved Society.

Warne was a supporter of the Labour Party, and was elected to Ashington Urban District Council in 1907, chairing it from 1919 to 1921. In 1919, he was also elected to Northumberland County Council. At the 1922 general election, he was elected as the Member of Parliament (MP) for the Wansbeck constituency in Northumberland, which had previously been held by a Liberal. He was re-elected at the 1923 and 1924 general elections, and died in office in 1928, aged 47.

At the resulting by-election, George Shield held the seat for Labour.

Parliament of the United Kingdom
Preceded by Robert Mason	Member of Parliament for Wansbeck; 1922–1928	Succeeded by George Shield
