= Denis Murphy (British politician) =

British politician

Member of Parliament for Wansbeck
- In office 1 May 1997 – 12 April 2010
- Preceded by: Jack Thompson
- Succeeded by: Ian Lavery

Personal details
- Born: 2 November 1948 (age 78) Ashington, Northumberland, England
- Party: Labour

Denis Murphy (born 2 November 1948) is a Labour Party politician in the United Kingdom who was the Member of Parliament (MP) for Wansbeck from 1997 until 2010.

== Early life ==
He attended the (Roman Catholic) St Cuthbert's Grammar School on Gretna Road in Newcastle upon Tyne. He then attended Northumberland College in Ashington.

He had previously led Wansbeck District Council. He is a member of the NUM and was the only member of the 1997 parliamentary intake to be backed by that union. Denis Murphy formerly worked down the mines himself. From 1965 to 1969, he was an apprentice electrician. From 1969 to 1994, he was an electrician at Ellington Colliery in Ellington, which closed in 2005.

== Parliamentary career ==
On his proudest achievement in government since 1997 Denis Murphy said: "I was proud of the major role I played to secure funding for the UK mining industry, safeguarding hundreds of jobs in my constituency and the future of the last deep mine in the Great Northern coalfield, Ellington colliery in Northumberland." Ellington Colliery subsequently closed on 26 January 2005.

- Voted for an amendment saying the case for renewing the UK's Trident nuclear submarine system "is not yet proven" and that a decision should be delayed.
- Signed Early Day Motion 2699 Freedom of Information, 10 December 2006.
- Has campaigned hard for a local rail service in his constituency, with talks advancing further in early 2007.

On 5 November 2009, Murphy announced his decision to stand down at the next general election. His successor in the constituency was Ian Lavery, the former President of the National Union of Mineworkers.

Parliament of the United Kingdom
Preceded by Jack Thompson	Member of Parliament for Wansbeck; 1997–2010	Succeeded by Ian Lavery
Trade union offices
Preceded by Ian Lavery	General Secretary of the Northumberland Area of the National Union of Mineworkers; 2010–present	Incumbent
