= 1929 Wansbeck by-election =

UK parliamentary by-election

The 1929 Wansbeck by-election was a by-election held on 13 February 1929 for the British House of Commons constituency of Wansbeck.

== Vacancy ==
The by-election was triggered by the death of the constituency's Labour Party member of parliament (MP) George Warne, who had held the seat since the 1922 general election.

== Candidates ==
The local Liberal association had selected 39 year-old Harry Anson Briggs as their prospective candidate in 1928. Briggs had stood for the Liberals in the 1923 general election at Sheffield Attercliffe and in the 1924 general election at Buckrose. He was educated at Sheffield Secondary School and Sheffield University. He saw active service from 1914 to 1918 in France and Belgium.

== Result ==
The result was a victory for the Labour candidate George Shield, who held the seat with a greatly increased majority.

Wansbeck by-election, 1929
Party	Candidate	Votes	%	±%
Labour	George Shield	20,398	58.0	+5.1
Conservative	Ian Moffat-Pender	9,612	27.3	−19.8
Liberal	Harry Anson Briggs	5,183	14.7	New
Majority		10,786	30.7	+24.9
Turnout		35,193	65.3	−14.1
Labour hold		Swing	+14.5	

Shield was re-elected at the general election in May 1929.

== See also ==
- Wansbeck constituency
- 1940 Wansbeck by-election
- 1918 Wansbeck by-election
- List of United Kingdom by-elections (1918–1931)
