= 1918 Wansbeck by-election =

UK parliamentary by-election

The 1918 Wansbeck by-election was a parliamentary by-election held for the UK House of Commons constituency of Wansbeck in Northumberland on 28 May 1918.

== Vacancy ==
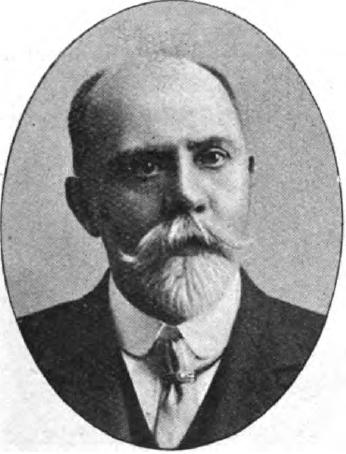
Charles Fenwick

The by-election was caused by the death on 20 April 1918 of the sitting Liberal MP Rt Hon. Charles Fenwick, at the age of 68. He had held the seat since the general election of 1885. Fenwick was prominent figure in the Northumberland Miners' Association having first worked as a coal miner at the age of 10. He was one of a large group of miners representatives who refused to join the Labour party.

== Electoral history ==
Fenwick, as a sponsored candidate of the Northumberland miners, had won the seat for the Liberals at every election since the seat was created in 1885. When the Miners Federation of Great Britain voted to affiliate to the Labour Party in 1909, Fenwick, retaining the support of the Northumberland miners, contested both 1910 general elections as a Liberal candidate. The Labour Party did not field a candidate against him and at the December 1910 general election he was returned unopposed. The last contested election in Wansbeck was the January 1910 contest;

General election January 1910 Electorate
Party	Candidate	Votes	%	±%
Lib-Lab	Charles Fenwick	10,872	70.0	−6.4
Conservative	Charles Percy	4,650	30.0	+6.4
Majority		6,222	40.0	−12.8
Turnout		15,522	81.6	+4.0
Lib-Lab hold		Swing	-6.8	

== Candidates ==
=== Liberals ===
Wansbeck Liberal Association adopted Alderman Robert Mason as their candidate to replace Fenwick. Mason was a 60-year-old shipping agent and shipowner with local government and community connections. He was an Alderman of Northumberland County Council and a Justice of the Peace.

=== Conservatives ===
As participants in the wartime coalition with Prime Minister, David Lloyd George, the Conservatives chose not to contest the by-election. Given that they normally polled poorly, this was not much of a sacrifice.

=== Labour ===
Despite the Liberal tradition in Wansbeck, and the fact that Fenwick had been unopposed at the last general election, and despite the wartime electoral party truce, the local Labour Party decided to contest the by-election and selected a local 34-year-old coal miner from Ashington, Ebenezer Edwards. Edwards was the nominee of the Northumberland Miners' Association and received the support of the Miners' Federation of Great Britain. He was not actually endorsed by the National Executive of the Labour Party, because of the wartime electoral truce. Edwards was an opponent of the war and had chosen to remain working in the mines rather than enlist.

== Campaign ==
Polling day was set for 28 May 1918, 38 days after the death of Fenwick, allowing for an unusually long campaign.

== Result ==
Mason retained the seat for the Liberal Party with a majority of 547 votes over Edwards.

Wansbeck by-election, 1918 Electorate
Party	Candidate	Votes	%	±%
Liberal	Robert Mason	5,814	52.5	N/A
Independent Labour	Ebenezer Edwards	5,267	47.5	New
Majority		547	5.0	N/A
Turnout		11,081	51.3	N/A
Liberal hold		Swing	N/A	

The result was a narrow endorsement by the electorate for the government’s handling of the war effort, both in military terms and industrially on the Home front. However Labour could claim to be wresting the traditional mining vote away from the Liberals.

== Aftermath ==
Soon after the Wansbeck result Labour’s National Executive Committee formally refused to renew the wartime truce between the political parties. Edwards took on Mason again for Labour at the 1918 general election but with a larger electorate and the national swing behind him, Mason increased his majority to 3,399.

Wansbeck General Election, 1918 Electorate 42,750
Party	Candidate	Votes	%	±%
Liberal	Robert Mason	14,065	56.9	+4.4
Labour	Ebenezer Edwards	10,666	43.1	−4.4
Majority		3,399	13.8	+8.8
Turnout		24,731	57.9	+6.6
Liberal hold		Swing	+4.4	

== See also ==
- List of United Kingdom by-elections
- United Kingdom by-election records
- 1929 Wansbeck by-election
- 1940 Wansbeck by-election
