= Blyth and Ashington =

UK Parliament constituency (since 2024)

Coordinates: 55.15°N 1.57°W

- County constituency for the House of Commons
- Interactive map of boundaries since 2024
- Location within North East England
- County: Northumberland
- Electorate: 75,452 (March 2020)
- Major settlements: Blyth, Ashington, Bedlington

Current constituency
- Created: 2024
- Member of Parliament: Ian Lavery (Labour)
- Seats: One
- Created from: Wansbeck; Blyth Valley (part)

Blyth and Ashington is a constituency represented in the House of Commons of the UK Parliament. Created as a result of the 2023 Periodic Review of Westminster constituencies, it was first contested at the 2024 general election. It is currently held by Ian Lavery of the Labour Party, who previously held the abolished constituency of Wansbeck from 2010 to 2024.

== Constituency profile ==
The Blyth and Ashington constituency is located in Northumberland and contains the towns of Blyth, Ashington, Bedlington and Newbiggin-by-the-Sea. The towns are varied in character; Blyth is a port town with a history of shipbuilding and Ashington was an important centre for coal mining. Bedlington is a historic market town and Newbiggin-by-the-Sea was traditionally a seaside resort town with a large fishing industry.

Compared to national averages, residents of the constituency are less wealthy and less likely to be degree-educated or work in professional jobs. House prices are very low, and 97% of the population are White. At the most recent county council election in 2025, most seats in the constituency were won by Reform UK candidates, although independent councillors were elected in Bedlington. An estimated 61% of voters supported leaving the European Union in the 2016 referendum, higher than the national figure of 52%.

== Boundaries ==
Further to the 2023 boundary review, the constituency was defined as composing the following electoral divisions of the County of Northumberland from the 2024 general election (as they existed on 1 December 2020):

- Ashington Central; Bedlington Central; Bedlington East; Bedlington West; Bothal; Choppington; College; Cowpen; Croft; Haydon; Hirst; Isabella; Kitty Brewster; Newbiggin Central and East; Newsham; Plessey; Seaton with Newbiggin West; Sleekburn; South Blyth; Stakeford; and Wensleydale.

The seat comprises the majority of the abolished constituency of Wansbeck, excluding the town of Morpeth(now part of North Northumberland), together with the town of Blyth from the abolished constituency of Blyth Valley.

Following a local government boundary review which came into effect in May 2025, the constituency now comprises the following electoral divisions of Northumberland:

- Ashington Central; Bebside and Kitty Brewster; Bedlington Central; Bedlington East; Bedlington West; Bothal; Choppington and Hepscott (part - including Choppington); College with North Seaton; Cowpen; Croft; Haydon; Hirst; Isabella; Newbiggin-by-the-Sea; Newsham; Plessey; Seaton with Spital; Sleekburn; South Blyth; Stakeford; and Wensleydale.

== Members of Parliament ==
Wansbeck prior to 2024

Election	Member	Party
2024	Ian Lavery	Labour

== Elections ==
=== Elections in the 2020s ===
2024 general election: Blyth and Ashington
Party	Candidate	Votes	%	±%
Labour	Ian Lavery	20,030	49.6	+1.9
Reform	Mark Peart	10,857	26.9	+17.8
Conservative	Maureen Levy	6,121	15.2	−18.3
Green	Steve Leyland	1,960	4.9	−2.0
Liberal Democrats	Stephen Psallidas	1,433	3.5	−2.9
Majority		9,173	22.7	+8.5
Turnout		40,401	53.5	−3.4
Labour hold		Swing		

=== Elections in the 2010s ===
2019 notional result
Party	Vote	%
Labour	20,500	47.7
Conservative	14,382	33.5
Brexit	3,921	9.1
Liberal Democrats	2,761	6.4
Green	1,248	2.9
CPA	178	0.4
Turnout	42,990	57.0
Electorate	75,452	

== See also ==
- List of parliamentary constituencies in Northumberland
- List of parliamentary constituencies in North East England (region)
