= George Shield =

British politician

George William Shield (24 March 1876 – 1 December 1935) was a British Labour Party politician.

Born in Coanwood, Northumberland, Shield became a coal miner before winning election as a checkweighman. A supporter of the Labour Party, he was elected to Northumberland County Council, and also served as a magistrate.

At the 1922 general election, he stood unsuccessfully in the Conservative-held Hexham constituency in Northumberland; finishing in third place with a 24% share of the vote.

Shield did not stand again until 1929, when he was elected as member of parliament for the Wansbeck constituency at a by-election on 13 February, and returned at the 1929 general election.

He was defeated at the 1931 general election by the Conservative candidate Bernard Cruddas, and did not stand again.

Parliament of the United Kingdom
Preceded by George Henry Warne	Member of Parliament for Wansbeck; 1929–1931	Succeeded by Bernard Cruddas
