= Wansbeck (constituency) =

UK Parliament constituency (1983–2024)

- Former county constituency for the House of Commons
- 2010–2024 boundary of Wansbeck in Northumberland

- Location of Northumberland within England
- County: Northumberland
- Electorate: 62,395 (December 2010)
- Major settlements: Morpeth, Ashington, Bedlington

1983–2024
- Seats: One
- Created from: Morpeth and Blyth
- Replaced by: Blyth and Ashington, North Northumberland

1885–1950
- Seats: One
- Type of constituency: County constituency
- Created from: South Northumberland
- Replaced by: Blyth, Hexham, Morpeth and Tynemouth

Wansbeck was a constituency (Note: A county constituency (for the purposes of election expenses and type of returning officer)) in Northumberland in the House of Commons of the UK Parliament. It was represented from its 1983 re-creation until its abolition for the 2024 general election by members of the Labour Party. (Note: As with all constituencies, the constituency elects one Member of Parliament (MP) by the first past the post system of election at least every five years.)

Under the 2023 Periodic Review of Westminster constituencies, the seat's area was split between the two new seats of Blyth and Ashington and North Northumberland.

== History ==
Wansbeck was first created by the Redistribution of Seats Act 1885 as one of four single-member divisions of the county of Northumberland. It was abolished for the 1950 general election, when it was largely replaced by the new constituency of Blyth.

The seat was re-established for the 1983 general election, largely replacing the abolished Morpeth constituency. The new version of the seat had very little in common with the version abolished in 1950; only Newbiggin-by-the-Sea and some rural areas were in both.

== Boundaries ==
=== 1885–1918 ===
The sessional districts of:

- Bedlingtonshire
- Castle East (except the parish of Wallsend)
- Morpeth
- Castle West (part)
- Coquetdale East (part)

NB included non-resident freeholders in the parliamentary borough of Morpeth

=== 1918–1950 ===
- The urban districts of Cramlington, Earsdon, Newbiggin-by-the-Sea, Newburn, Seaton Delaval, Seghill, and Whitley and Monkseaton
- parts of the rural districts of Castle Ward, and Morpeth.

Gained Newburn and surrounding areas from the abolished Tyneside Division. Ashington transferred to Morpeth and a small area in north (Amble) transferred to Berwick-upon-Tweed.

=== First abolition ===
The contents of the constituency were distributed as follows:

- rural areas around the borough of Morpeth, including Newbiggin-by-the-Sea, to Morpeth;
- Seaton Valley urban district (incorporating Cramlington, Seghill, Earsdon and Seaton Delaval) to Blyth;
- Whitley Bay to Tynemouth;
- rural areas to the west of Newcastle upon Tyne to Hexham; and
- Newburn to Newcastle upon Tyne West

=== 1983–2024 ===
Map of 1983–2024 boundaries
- the Borough of Castle Morpeth wards of Hebron, Hepscott and Mitford, Morpeth Central, Morpeth Kirkhill, Morpeth North, Morpeth South, Morpeth Stobhill and Pegswood; and
- the District of Wansbeck (comprising the wards of: Bedlington Central, Bedlington East, Bedlington West, Bothal, Central, Choppington, Guide Post, Haydon, Hurst, Newbiggin East, Newbiggin West, Park, Seaton, Sleekburn, and Stakeford).

The majority of the constituency, including Morpeth, Ashington, and Newbiggin had comprised the bulk of the abolished constituency of Morpeth. Bedlington was transferred from Blyth.

=== 2007 boundary review ===
In the fifth periodic boundary review of parliamentary representation in Northumberland, which came into effect for the 2010 general election, the Boundary Commission for England recommended that no changes be made to the Wansbeck constituency.

In 2009, a government reorganisation resulted in the abolition of all local government boroughs and districts in Northumberland and the establishment of the county as a unitary authority. However, this did not affect the constituency boundaries.

== Constituency profile ==
Named after the River Wansbeck and former district of the same name, the seat had the visitor attractions of a historic main town with a castle, Morpeth and the traditional seaside town of Newbiggin. Workless claimants as registered jobseekers, with high male unemployment, which is widespread but exacerbated in the area, in November 2012, was higher than the national average of 3.8%, at 6.2% of the population based on a statistical compilation by The Guardian. This was marginally higher than the then regional average of 5.9%.

== Political history ==
=== 1885–1950 ===
Political history

The seat alternated in accordance with the national trend in strong mining communities outside of South Yorkshire, which as such saw significant early Labour support, and, in the 1931 and 1935 elections, led to a general transfer of loyalty to the Conservative Party, ushering in a return to Labour support at the next contested election in 1945.

Prominent frontbenchers

Alfred Robens represented the area in the Attlee ministry and towards the end of the year of Attlee's more marginal victory (1950–1951) served as Minister of Labour and National Service. He then in 1950 won instead the newly created Blyth seat to the immediate south. In 1955 he became Shadow Foreign Secretary until an unimpressive performance in predicting and reacting to events in the Suez Crisis in 1956. However, in a position which would span the period 1961 until 1971, he became Chairman of the National Coal Board (and Lord Robens) and oversaw substantial cuts in the mining industry. During this period he co-authored the Robens Report that followed his difficult but practical risk management of the coal mining sector, including accepting some culpability in the Aberfan Disaster. This led, with the ministry of Barbara Castle's adjustments, to the Health and Safety at Work etc. Act 1974 which set up the Health and Safety Executive and remains the foundation of this area of English law.

=== 1983–2024 ===
The constituency was held solely by Labour since its recreation, presenting a safe seat. However, in 2019 - in line with the huge swing in their favour in traditional Labour seats in the North and Midlands - the Conservatives reduced the Labour majority to an unprecedentedly low three-figure total.

== Members of Parliament ==
=== MPs 1885–1950 ===
Election	Member	Party
1885	Charles Fenwick	Liberal
1918 by-election	Robert Mason	Coalition Liberal
Jan 1922	Robert Mason	National Liberal
Nov 1922	George Warne	Labour
1929 by-election	George Shield	Labour
1931	Bernard Cruddas	Conservative
1940 by-election	Donald Scott	Conservative
1945	Alfred Robens	Labour
1950	Constituency abolished	

=== MPs 1983−2024 ===
Election	Member	Party
1983	Jack Thompson	Labour
1997	Denis Murphy	Labour
2010	Ian Lavery	Labour
2024	Constituency abolished	

== Election results 1983–2024 ==
=== Elections in the 1980s ===
General election 1983: Wansbeck
Party	Candidate	Votes	%	±%
Labour	Jack Thompson	21,732	47.0	
Liberal	Alan Thompson	13,901	30.1	
Conservative	Charles Mitchell	10,563	22.9	
Majority		7,831	17.0	
Turnout		46,196	72.8	
Labour win (new seat)				

General election 1987: Wansbeck
Party	Candidate	Votes	%	±%
Labour	Jack Thompson	28,080	57.5	+10.5
Liberal	Sarah Mitchell	11,291	23.1	−7.0
Conservative	David Walton	9,490	19.4	−3.5
Majority		16,789	34.4	+17.4
Turnout		48,861	78.0	+5.2
Labour hold		Swing	+8.8	

=== Elections in the 1990s ===
General election 1992: Wansbeck
Party	Candidate	Votes	%	±%
Labour	Jack Thompson	30,046	59.7	+2.2
Conservative	Glen Sanderson	11,872	23.6	+4.2
Liberal Democrats	Brian C. Priestley	7,691	15.3	−7.8
Green	Nic Best	710	1.4	New
Majority		18,174	36.1	+1.7
Turnout		50,319	79.3	+1.3
Labour hold		Swing	+5.0	

General election 1997: Wansbeck
Party	Candidate	Votes	%	±%
Labour	Denis Murphy	29,569	65.5	+5.8
Liberal Democrats	Alan Thompson	7,202	15.9	+0.6
Conservative	Paul V. Green	6,299	13.9	−9.7
Referendum	Peter H. Gompertz	1,146	2.5	New
Green	Nic Best	956	2.1	+0.7
Majority		22,367	49.6	+13.5
Turnout		45,172	71.7	−7.6
Labour hold		Swing	+7.8	

=== Elections in the 2000s ===
General election 2001: Wansbeck
Party	Candidate	Votes	%	±%
Labour	Denis Murphy	21,617	57.8	−7.7
Liberal Democrats	Alan Thompson	8,516	22.8	+6.9
Conservative	Rachael Lake	4,774	12.8	−1.1
Independent	Michael Kirkup	1,076	2.9	New
Green	Nic Best	954	2.5	+0.4
UKIP	Gavin Attwell	482	1.3	New
Majority		13,101	35.0	−14.6
Turnout		37,419	59.3	−12.4
Labour hold		Swing	−7.3	

General election 2005: Wansbeck
Party	Candidate	Votes	%	±%
Labour	Denis Murphy	20,315	55.2	−2.6
Liberal Democrats	Simon Reed	9,734	26.4	+3.6
Conservative	Ginny Scrope	5,515	15.0	+2.2
Green	Nic Best	1,245	3.4	+0.9
Majority		10,581	28.8	−6.2
Turnout		36,809	58.4	−0.9
Labour hold		Swing	−3.1	

=== Elections in the 2010s ===
General election 2010: Wansbeck
Party	Candidate	Votes	%	±%
Labour	Ian Lavery	17,548	45.9	−9.3
Liberal Democrats	Simon Reed	10,517	27.5	+1.1
Conservative	Campbell Storey	6,714	17.5	+2.5
BNP	Stephen Finlay	1,481	3.7	New
UKIP	Linda-Lee Stokoe	974	2.5	New
Green	Nic Best	601	1.6	−1.8
Independent	Malcolm Reid	359	0.9	New
Christian	Michael Flynn	142	0.4	New
Majority		7,031	18.4	−10.4
Turnout		38,336	62.1	+2.3
Labour hold		Swing	−5.2	

General election 2015: Wansbeck
Party	Candidate	Votes	%	±%
Labour	Ian Lavery	19,267	50.0	+4.1
Conservative	Chris Galley	8,386	21.8	+4.3
UKIP	Melanie Hurst	7,014	18.2	+15.7
Liberal Democrats	Tom Hancock	2,407	6.2	−21.3
Green	Christopher Hedley	1,454	3.8	+2.2
Majority		10,881	28.2	+9.8
Turnout		38,528	63.6	+2.9
Labour hold		Swing	0.0	

General election 2017: Wansbeck
Party	Candidate	Votes	%	±%
Labour	Ian Lavery	24,338	57.3	+7.3
Conservative	Chris Galley	13,903	32.7	+10.9
Liberal Democrats	Joan Tebbutt	2,015	4.7	−1.5
UKIP	Melanie Hurst	1,483	3.5	−14.7
Green	Steven Leyland	715	1.7	−2.1
Majority		10,435	24.6	−3.6
Turnout		42,454	68.4	+4.8
Labour hold		Swing	−1.8	

General election 2019: Wansbeck
Party	Candidate	Votes	%	±%
Labour	Ian Lavery	17,124	42.3	−15.0
Conservative	Jack Gebhard	16,310	40.3	+7.6
Brexit Party	Eden Webley	3,141	7.8	New
Liberal Democrats	Stephen Psallidas	2,539	6.3	+1.6
Green	Steven Leyland	1,217	3.0	+1.3
CPA	Michael Flynn	178	0.4	New
Majority		814	2.0	−22.6
Turnout		40,509	64.0	−4.4
Labour hold		Swing	−11.3	

== Election results 1885–1950 ==
=== Elections in the 1880s ===
Fenwick

General election 1885: Wansbeck
Party	Candidate	Votes	%	±%
Lib-Lab	Charles Fenwick	5,858	68.4	
Conservative	John Blencowe Cookson	2,703	31.6	
Majority		3,155	36.8	
Turnout		8,561	82.4	
Registered electors		10,392		
Lib-Lab win (new seat)				

General election 1886: Wansbeck
Party	Candidate	Votes	%	±%
Lib-Lab	Charles Fenwick	5,235	75.4	+7.0
Liberal Unionist	William Wight	1,710	24.6	−7.0
Majority		3,525	50.8	+14.0
Turnout		6,945	66.8	−15.6
Registered electors		10,392		
Lib-Lab hold		Swing	+7.0	

=== Elections in the 1890s ===
General election 1892: Wansbeck
Party	Candidate	Votes	%	±%
Lib-Lab	Charles Fenwick	5,696	66.1	−9.3
Conservative	Seymour McCalmont Hill	2,920	33.9	+9.3
Majority		2,776	32.2	−18.6
Turnout		8,616	76.2	+9.4
Registered electors		11,304		
Lib-Lab hold		Swing	−9.3	

General election 1895: Wansbeck
Party	Candidate	Votes	%	±%
Lib-Lab	Charles Fenwick	5,629	69.9	+3.8
Conservative	Joseph John Harris	2,422	30.1	−3.8
Majority		3,207	39.8	+7.6
Turnout		8,051	65.8	−10.4
Registered electors		12,234		
Lib-Lab hold		Swing	+3.8	

=== Elections in the 1900s ===
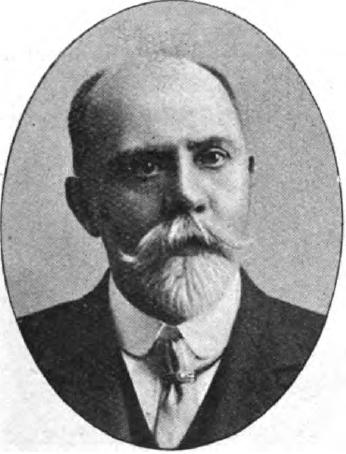
Fenwick

General election 1900: Wansbeck
Party	Candidate	Votes	%	±%
Lib-Lab	Charles Fenwick	5,474	56.1	−13.8
Conservative	J Stanley Appleby	4,283	43.9	+13.8
Majority		1,191	12.2	−27.6
Turnout		9,757	68.8	+3.0
Registered electors		14,179		
Lib-Lab hold		Swing	−13.8	

General election 1906: Wansbeck
Party	Candidate	Votes	%	±%
Lib-Lab	Charles Fenwick	10,386	76.4	+20.3
Conservative	Walter Riddell	3,210	23.6	−20.3
Majority		7,176	52.8	+40.6
Turnout		13,596	77.6	+8.8
Registered electors		17,529		
Lib-Lab hold		Swing	+20.3	

=== Elections in the 1910s ===
General election January 1910: Wansbeck
Party	Candidate	Votes	%	±%
Lib-Lab	Charles Fenwick	10,872	70.0	−6.4
Conservative	Charles Percy	4,650	30.0	+6.4
Majority		6,222	40.0	−12.8
Turnout		15,522	81.6	+4.0
Registered electors		19,028		
Lib-Lab hold		Swing	−6.8	

General election December 1910: Wansbeck
Party	Candidate	Votes	%	±%
Lib-Lab	Charles Fenwick	Unopposed		
Lib-Lab hold				

General Election 1914–15:

Another General Election was required to take place before the end of 1915. The political parties had been making preparations for an election to take place and by July 1914, the following candidates had been selected;

- Liberal-Labour:Charles Fenwick
- Labour: William Straker

1918 Wansbeck by-election
Party	Candidate	Votes	%	±%
National Liberal	Robert Mason	5,814	52.5	N/A
Independent Labour	Ebenezer Edwards (Note: Edwards was the nominee of the Northumberland Miners' Association and was supported by the Miners' Federation of Great Britain. However, due to the War-time electoral pact, he was not endorsed by Labour's national executive)	5,267	47.5	New
Majority		547	5.0	N/A
Turnout		11,081	51.3	N/A
Registered electors		21,602		
National Liberal gain from Lib-Lab		Swing	N/A	

General election 1918: Wansbeck
Party		Candidate	Votes	%	±%
C	National Liberal	Robert Mason	14,065	56.9	N/A
	Labour	Ebby Edwards	10,666	43.1	New
Majority			3,399	13.8	N/A
Turnout			24,731	57.9	N/A
Registered electors			42,750		
	National Liberal gain from Lib-Lab		Swing	N/A	
C indicates candidate endorsed by the coalition government.

=== Elections in the 1920s ===
General election 1922: Wansbeck
Party	Candidate	Votes	%	±%
Labour	George Warne	16,032	45.2	+2.1
Unionist	R. White	11,149	31.4	New
National Liberal	John Neal	5,192	14.6	–42.3
Liberal	Matthew Davey	3,134	8.8	New
Majority		4,883	13.8	N/A
Turnout		35,507	76.6	+18.7
Registered electors		46,354		
Labour gain from National Liberal		Swing	+25.1	

General election 1923: Wansbeck
Party	Candidate	Votes	%	±%
Labour	George Warne	18,583	56.8	+11.6
Unionist	Hilton Philipson	14,131	43.2	+11.8
Majority		4,452	13.6	−0.2
Turnout		32,714	68.4	−8.2
Registered electors		47,828		
Labour hold		Swing	−0.1	

General election 1924: Wansbeck
Party	Candidate	Votes	%	±%
Labour	George Warne	21,159	52.9	−3.9
Unionist	M.K. Middleton	18,875	47.1	+3.9
Majority		2,284	5.8	−7.8
Turnout		40,034	79.4	+11.0
Registered electors		50,446		
Labour hold		Swing	−3.9	

1929 Wansbeck by-election
Party	Candidate	Votes	%	±%
Labour	George Shield	20,398	58.0	+5.1
Unionist	Ian Moffat-Pender	9,612	27.3	−19.8
Liberal	Harry Briggs	5,183	14.7	New
Majority		10,786	30.7	+24.9
Turnout		35,193	65.3	−14.1
Registered electors		53,886		
Labour hold		Swing	+12.5	

General election 1929: Wansbeck
Party	Candidate	Votes	%	±%
Labour	George Shield	27,930	54.5	+1.6
Unionist	Bernard Cruddas	17,056	33.2	−13.9
Liberal	Frederick Waudby	6,330	12.3	New
Majority		10,874	21.2	+15.4
Turnout		51,310	76.1	−3.3
Registered electors		67,390		
Labour hold		Swing	+7.8	

=== Elections in the 1930s ===
General election 1931: Wansbeck
Party	Candidate	Votes	%	±%
Conservative	Bernard Cruddas	33,659	58.25	
Labour	George Shield	24,126	41.75	
Majority		9,533	16.50	N/A
Turnout		57,785	81.86	
Conservative gain from Labour		Swing		

General election 1935: Wansbeck
Party	Candidate	Votes	%	±%
Conservative	Bernard Cruddas	30,859	50.79	
Labour	Edward Dowling	29,904	49.21	
Majority		955	1.58	
Turnout		60,763	79.59	
Conservative hold		Swing		

=== Elections in the 1940s ===
1940 Wansbeck by-election
Party	Candidate	Votes	%	±%
Conservative	Donald Scott	Unopposed	N/A	N/A
Conservative hold				

General election 1945: Wansbeck
Party	Candidate	Votes	%	±%
Labour	Alfred Robens	40,948	60.00	
Conservative	Donald Scott	27,295	40.00	
Majority		13,653	20.00	N/A
Turnout		67,793	77.69	
Labour gain from Conservative		Swing		

== See also ==
- List of parliamentary constituencies in Northumberland
- History of parliamentary constituencies and boundaries in Northumberland
- 1929 Wansbeck by-election
- 1940 Wansbeck by-election
- 1918 Wansbeck by-election

== Sources ==
- Craig, F. W. S. (1983) [1969]. British parliamentary election results 1918–1949 (3rd ed.). Chichester: Parliamentary Research Services. ISBN 0-900178-06-X.
