= Ellington, Northumberland =

Village in Northumberland, England

Coordinates: 55.2209°N 1.5621°W

Ellington
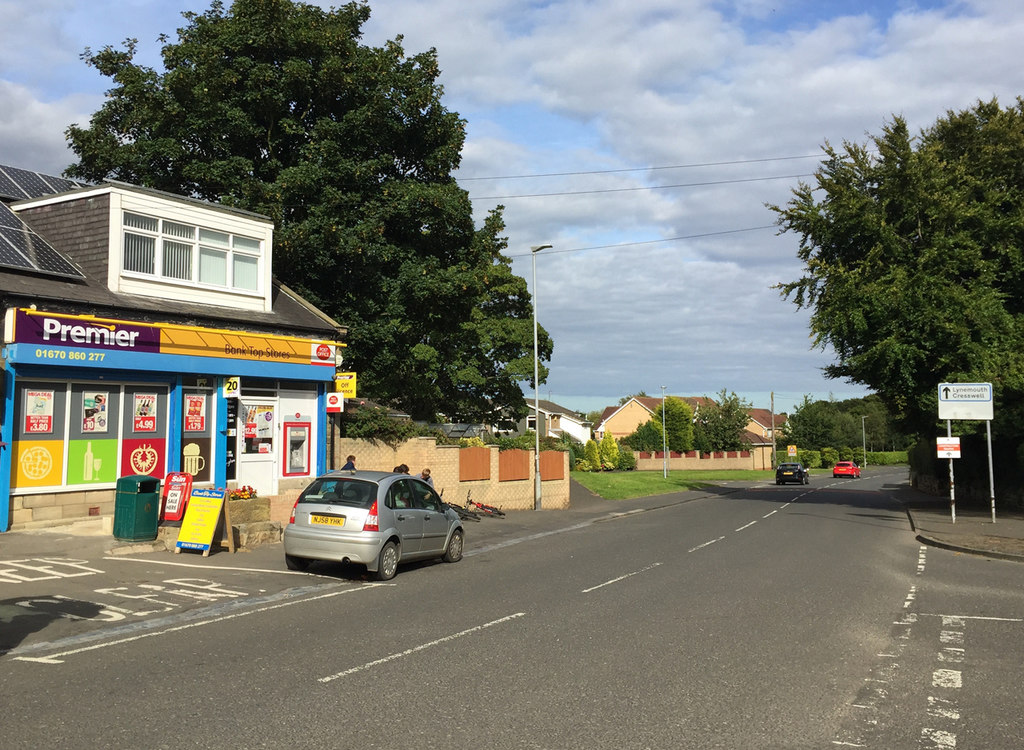

- Location within Northumberland
- Population: 2,778 (2011)
- OS grid reference: NZ278919
- Civil parish: Ellington and Linton
- Unitary authority: Northumberland
- Ceremonial county: Northumberland
- Region: North East
- Country: England
- Sovereign state: United Kingdom
- Post town: MORPETH
- Postcode district: NE61
- Dialling code: 01670
- Police: Northumbria
- Fire: Northumberland
- Ambulance: North East
- UK Parliament: North Northumberland

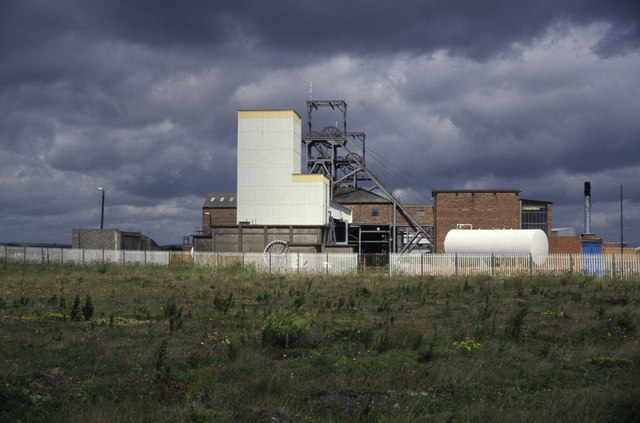
Ellington Colliery

Ellington is a small village in the civil parish of Ellington and Linton, on the coast of Northumberland, England. Ellington is 4 miles (6 km) from Ashington, 6 miles (10 km) from Morpeth and 20 miles (32 km) north of Newcastle upon Tyne.

Ellington was the site of the last remaining operational deep coal mine in North East England. Ellington Colliery closed on 26 January 2005. It was the last deep mine in the UK to extract coal from under the sea.

Today, Ellington is made up almost exclusively of private housing. It has one school, village shops, and one public house, the Plough Inn.

== History ==
The name of the village is first recorded as Elingtona in 1186. It is thought to derive from Anglo-Saxon words meaning either 'farmstead at the place where eels are caught' or 'farmstead associated with a man called Ella or Eli'.

Throughout recorded history, the lands of Ellington have had many owners. The manor of Ellington was thought to belong to Adam de Periton in 1240 and later to pass by marriage to the ancient families of Vescy and Welles. The Widdrington family were known to acquire possessions in Ellington as early as the 13th century. In 1715, Lord Widdrington relinquished the manor of Ellington, along with the manors of Woodhorn, Cresswell and Newbiggin. Other lands and interests in Ellington belonging to other landowners were sold in 1750 to Adam Askew of Newcastle upon Tyne. By the early years of the 19th century, the greater part of the village was owned by the Baker-Cresswells. This situation remained until the sale of their estate in 1924 (the family, now based at nearby Bamburgh, is still - 2006 -influential in the area).

Ellington is well known as being a colliery village but was a thriving community long before the opening of the Colliery, having a school, two public houses and several businesses by the mid-19th century.

The Colliery, which was originally owned by the Ashington Coal Company, began production in 1911. By the time the collieries were nationalised in 1947 there were 1,381 men employed. By 1986 the number had grown to around 2,170 men producing approximately 45,000 tonnes of coal per week. Pit ponies were used in the colliery until 1994.

The Colliery changed the face of the one time rural village, with the building of three rows of colliery houses and more shops and businesses. In 1912 a co-operative store was built on land that had once been part of the Cresswell estate, bringing more prosperity to the village. This was eventually superseded by a larger store built in the neighbouring village of Lynemouth.

The colliery was used as the fictional 'Everington' mine in the Stephen Daldry film Billy Elliot.

Hagg Farm, which lies to the north of the village, was bought in 1924 for £8,500 by the Wood family who had been the tenants for over 300 years. The farm consisted of a house, four cottages and 360 acres (1.5 km^{2}) of land.

On 16 June 1992 the parish was renamed from "Ellington" to "Ellington and Linton".

== Education ==
There has been a school in Ellington since 1837; it now offers education for children aged 3 to 11. The original school building of 1837 is now the village library.

To serve the ever-growing population, a new school was built in 1976; it soon proved to be too small and remodelling and extension work took place in 1986. At that time the nursery accommodation was added, which facilitated the later provision of the Early Years Unit.

The school crest was designed by a pupil and features a drawing of the colliery, the beach, the Alcan smelter (since demolished) and the school.
