= 1893 Hexham by-election =

UK parliamentary by-election

A parliamentary by-election was held for the British House of Commons constituency of Hexham, Northumberland, on 17 February 1893. The by-election was triggered by an election petition which removed Unionist MP Nathaniel Clayton. The result was a gain by the Liberal Party from the Conservatives.

== Result ==
1893 Hexham by-election
| Party | Candidate | Votes | % | ±% |
|---|---|---|---|---|
| Liberal | Miles MacInnes | 4,804 | 52.4 | +2.9 |
| Conservative | Richard Clayton | 4,358 | 47.6 | −2.9 |
| Majority | | 446 | 4.8 | N/A |
| Turnout | | 9,162 | 87.3 | +5.9 |
| Registered electors | | 10,494 | | |
| Liberal gain from Conservative | | Swing | +2.9 | |
