= Jesmond Parish Church =

Evangelical church in Newcastle upon Tyne, England

Coordinates: 54°58′56.3″N 1°36′23.5″W

Clayton Memorial Church, Jesmond
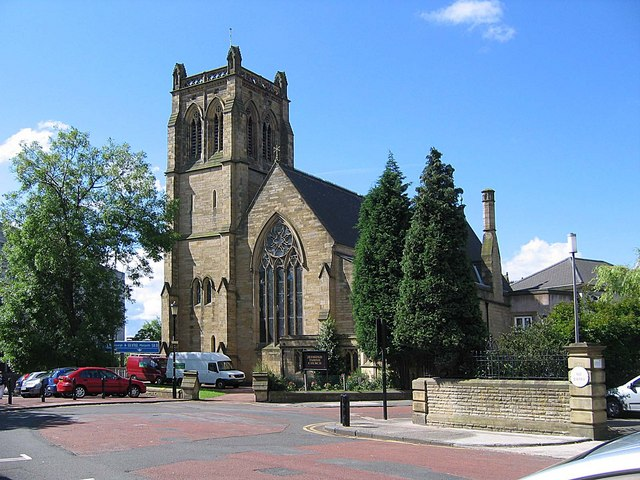
- Clayton Memorial Church, Jesmond
- Denomination: Church of England
- Tradition: Anglican
- Churchmanship: Conservative Evangelical
- Website: https://www.jpc.org.uk/

History
- Founded: 1861

Architecture
- Functional status: Active
- Architect: John Dobson

Administration
- Province: Province of York
- Diocese: Diocese of Newcastle
- Archdeaconry: Archdeaconry of Northumberland
- Deanery: Newcastle Central
- Parish: Jesmond, Clayton Memorial

Clergy
- Vicar: David Holloway (Emeritus)

Jesmond Parish Church is a parish church in the Church of England situated in Jesmond, a suburb of Newcastle upon Tyne, Tyne and Wear, England. The church's official name is the Clayton Memorial Church and is unusual among Anglican parish churches in not being named after either a saint who appears in the church's calendar or a person of the Trinity. This reflects the church's conservative Evangelical roots. It is a grade II listed building.

== History ==
The church had a slightly unusual beginning. 1856 saw the death of the Rev Richard Clayton, Master of St Thomas' Church in Haymarket and a local Evangelical luminary. In his place the church authorities wished to appoint Clement Moody, a high church successor who was out of sympathy with Clayton's Reformed Evangelical principles. A large number of the congregation of St Thomas's were deeply unhappy. A committee was formed with the intention of planting a new church nearby, which "will form a central point for the maintenance and promulgation of sound scriptural and evangelical truth in a large and populous town." At the time, much of the land around the site was open fields; the building was designed by the architect John Dobson and consecrated in 1861. A vestry was added in 1874.

The church's original designation was "The Clayton Memorial". Over the vestry door is an inscription: "This church, consecrated to the Glory of God, 14th January, 1861, was erected to the memory of the Rev. Richard Clayton, M.A., who was for 30 years Master of the Hospital of St. Mary Magdalene, and the faithful minister of St. Thomas's Church, Newcastle-upon-Tyne. He died 8th October, 1856, aged 54 years." To friends of Rev. Moody, however, the church was known as St Spite's.

== Present day ==
Jesmond Parish Church is a conservative evangelical Anglican church of approximately 1,100 people. Currently senior team of the church includes Jonathan Pryke (Senior Minister), Ramzi Adcock (Senior Minister Designate), Ian Garrett (Senior Assistant Minister) and Liz Jackson (Women's Worker) and Dan McBride (Head of Children and Youth), other staff members who preach are Matt Elder and Benji Cook. The church is noted for its preaching, which aims to be expository and evangelistic.

The church has a close relationship with the Christian Institute whose national headquarters are also in Newcastle. David Holloway is a prominent member of the institute. Both organisations take a strong stance against homosexual practice, in more recent times in relation to the legislation on civil partnerships, which has led to the church's services being picketed on a number of occasions by gay rights activists. In October 1999 the church was vandalised with graffiti opposing the church's stance on human sexuality.

Jesmond Parish Church is a member of Reform, a network of evangelical churches within the Church of England which includes some of the largest Anglican churches in the UK. Other churches with similar theology include:

- St Andrew The Great, Cambridge
- St Ebbe's, Oxford
- St Helen's Bishopsgate
- Christ Church, Fulwood, Sheffield

On 2 May 2017, Jonathan Pryke, a minister of Jesmond Parish Church, was consecrated a bishop by Glenn Lyons, the Presiding Bishop of the Reformed Evangelical Anglican Church of South Africa (REACH-SA). This was controversial due to REACH-SA's status outside of the Anglican Communion, and because the consecration occurred "without the knowledge of the diocese or its Bishop" (the Bishop of Newcastle).

=== List of vicars ===
- 1861-1882 Canon Berkeley Addison
- 1882-1888 Canon Somerset Pennefather
- 1889-1894 Theodore Charles Chapman
- 1894-1897 Edwin Savage
- 1898-1907 Canon Thomas Brocas Waters
- 1907-1916 Canon James Inskip
- 1916-1927 Canon George Oakley
- 1927-1947 Canon George Goddard
- 1947-1959 Harry Bates
- 1960-1972 Roger Frith
- 1973–present David Holloway

=== Organ ===
The church houses a pipe organ by the notable builder James Jepson Binns of Leeds which dates from 1913, although it has fallen into severe disrepair and is no longer played. It contains pipework from an organ by T. C. Lewis of 1895. A specification of the organ can be found on the National Pipe Organ Register.

=== List of organists ===
- Charles Chambers 1882-1890
- John Murray 1890 - ????
- Claud H. Hill
- J.E.Hutchinson 1903- 947
- George Henry Sutcliffe 1947-1978 - ????
- Chris Foy
- Chris Edwards 1996-2011

=== List of assistant organists ===
- Clifford Harker 1928-1930
- Graham Steed 1934-1941
- Miles Cragg 2006– ????
