= 1907 Hexham by-election =

UK Parliamentary by-election

- 27 March 1907

Candidate	Holt	Bates
Party	Liberal	Conservative
Popular vote	5,401	4,244
Percentage	56.0%	44.0%
MP before election
Wentworth Beaumont
Liberal
Subsequent MP
Richard Durning Holt
Liberal

The 1907 Hexham by-election was held on 27 March 1907. The by-election was held due to the succession to the barony of Allendale of the incumbent Liberal MP, Wentworth Beaumont. It was won by the Liberal candidate Richard Durning Holt.

== History ==
Beaumont

General election 1906: Hexham
Party	Candidate	Votes	%	±%
Liberal	Wentworth Beaumont	5,632	61.4	+10.3
Conservative	Nathaniel George Clayton	3,547	38.6	−10.3
Majority		2,085	22.8	+20.6
Turnout		9,179	83.1	+3.5
Registered electors		11,049		
Liberal hold		Swing	+10.3	

== Result ==
Holt

Hexham by-election, 1907
Party	Candidate	Votes	%	±%
Liberal	Richard Durning Holt	5,401	56.0	−5.4
Conservative	Charles Loftus Bates	4,244	44.0	+5.4
Majority		1,157	12.0	−10.8
Turnout		9,645	86.8	+3.7
Registered electors		11,116		
Liberal hold		Swing	−5.4	

== Aftermath ==
General election January 1910: Hexham
Party	Candidate	Votes	%	±%
Liberal	Richard Durning Holt	5,478	55.4	−0.6
Conservative	Charles Loftus Bates	4,417	44.6	+0.6
Majority		1,061	10.8	−1.2
Turnout		9,895	87.3	+4.2
Registered electors		11,335		
Liberal hold		Swing	−0.6	
