= Berkeley Addison =

British Anglican clergyman (1815–1882)

The Reverend Canon Berkeley Addison
- Vicar of Jesmond
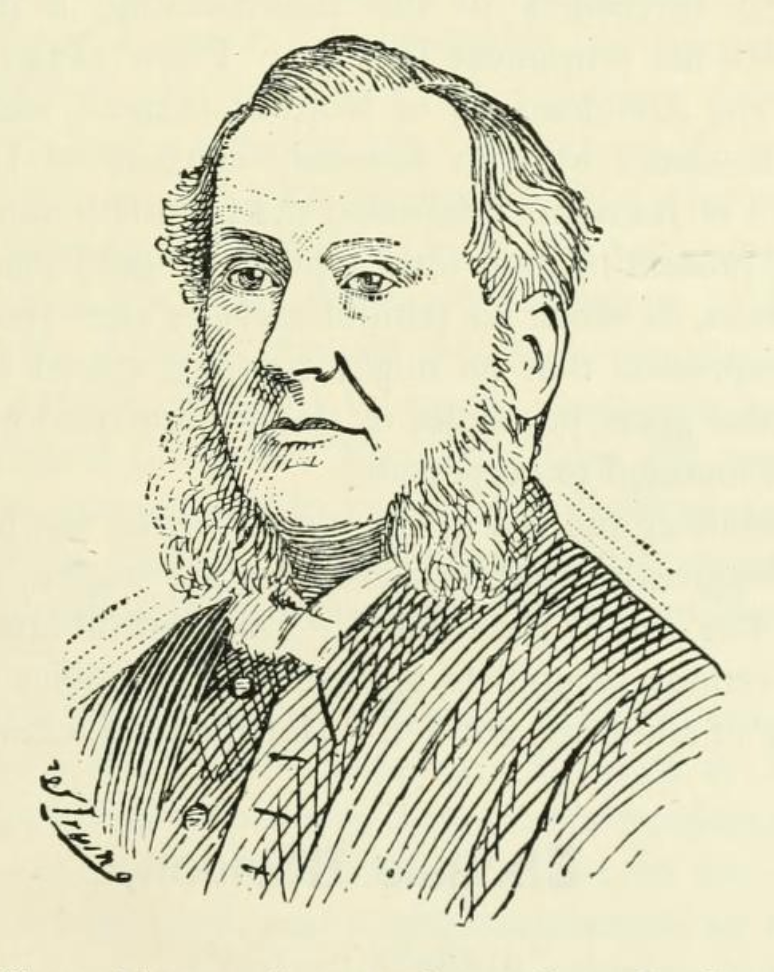
- Church: Church of England
- Province: Province of York
- Diocese: Diocese of Durham
- See: Jesmond
- In office: 1861–1882
- Other posts: Proctor for the Archdeaconry of Northumberland (1874–1880), Honorary Canon of Durham (1880–1882), Vice-Chairman and Chairman of Newcastle School Board
- Previous posts: Curate of Brighton, Curate of Kensington, Curate of Edinburgh, Rector of Collyhurst

Orders
- Ordination: Deacon (1839), Priest (1840)

Personal details
- Born: Berkeley Addison; June 4, 1815 England
- Died: January 13, 1882 (aged 66) Jesmond Vicarage, Newcastle upon Tyne, England
- Denomination: Anglican
- Parents: Rev. Joseph Addison
- Spouse: Eliza Addison
- Children: 6
- Occupation: Clergyman; writer
- Education: Peterhouse, Cambridge (B.A.)

Berkeley Addison (bapt. 4 June 1815 – 13 January 1882) was a British Anglican clergyman, the first vicar of Jesmond, Newcastle upon Tyne from 1861 to 1882, following the erection of Jesmond Parish Church.

== Biography ==
Berkeley Addison was the second son of the Rev. Joseph Addison, of Shifnal, Shropshire, and was educated at Peterhouse, Cambridge, where he was classical prizeman in 1836, and graduated B.A. in 1839.

Ordained deacon in 1839, and priest in 1840, he held brief curacies at Brighton and Kensington, and in 1843 settled in Edinburgh as curate under Dean Ramsay where he remained for twelve years. According to the 1851 census, he was married to Eliza, had three daughters and three sons, and maintained a groom and six female domestic servants. In 1855 he was appointed rector of Collyhurst, near Manchester.

Jesmond Parish Church was erected as a protest against the election of Clement Moody, vicar of Newcastle, as master of the Mary Magdalene Hospital and chaplain to the Church of St Thomas the Martyr in Newcastle in 1856. The basis of the new church's foundation was the wish of its congregation to be served by an Evangelical minister. Against that brief, Adamson was selected and brought to Newcastle at the close of 1860, prior to the consecration of the new building in 1861.

Richard Welford describes Adamson as an eloquent preacher, a fluent platform speaker, and a liberal-minded man, who soon became popular in Newcastle. When the School Board was formed in the town, he was put forward as one of the Church candidates, and, of the fifteen representatives elected, was returned tenth on the poll. His fellow-members elected him to be the first vice-chairman of the Board, from which position he succeeded to the chairmanship, a post which he occupied until his retirement in 1877.

From 1874 to 1880 he was proctor for the Archdeaconry of Northumberland, and in the meantime was presented with an honorary canonry of Durham.

The congregation at Jesmond celebrated the twentieth anniversary of his ministry by presenting him with a purse of gold containing £320, and an address, in which his faithful services were recognised, and a hope was expressed that he might be long spared to uphold and expound those great principles of the Reformation which Jesmond Church was founded to perpetuate.

Canon Addison was not a voluminous writer, but he had a ready pen, and frequently used it. He was the author of two volumes, The Ark of Israel and The Rod of Moses. He also published various pamphlets against the Oxford Movement, and a series of addresses entitled Manchester Lectures.

Addison died on 13 January 1882, at Jesmond Vicarage, Newcastle, in his 67th year.
