= Guy Opperman =

British politician (born 1965)

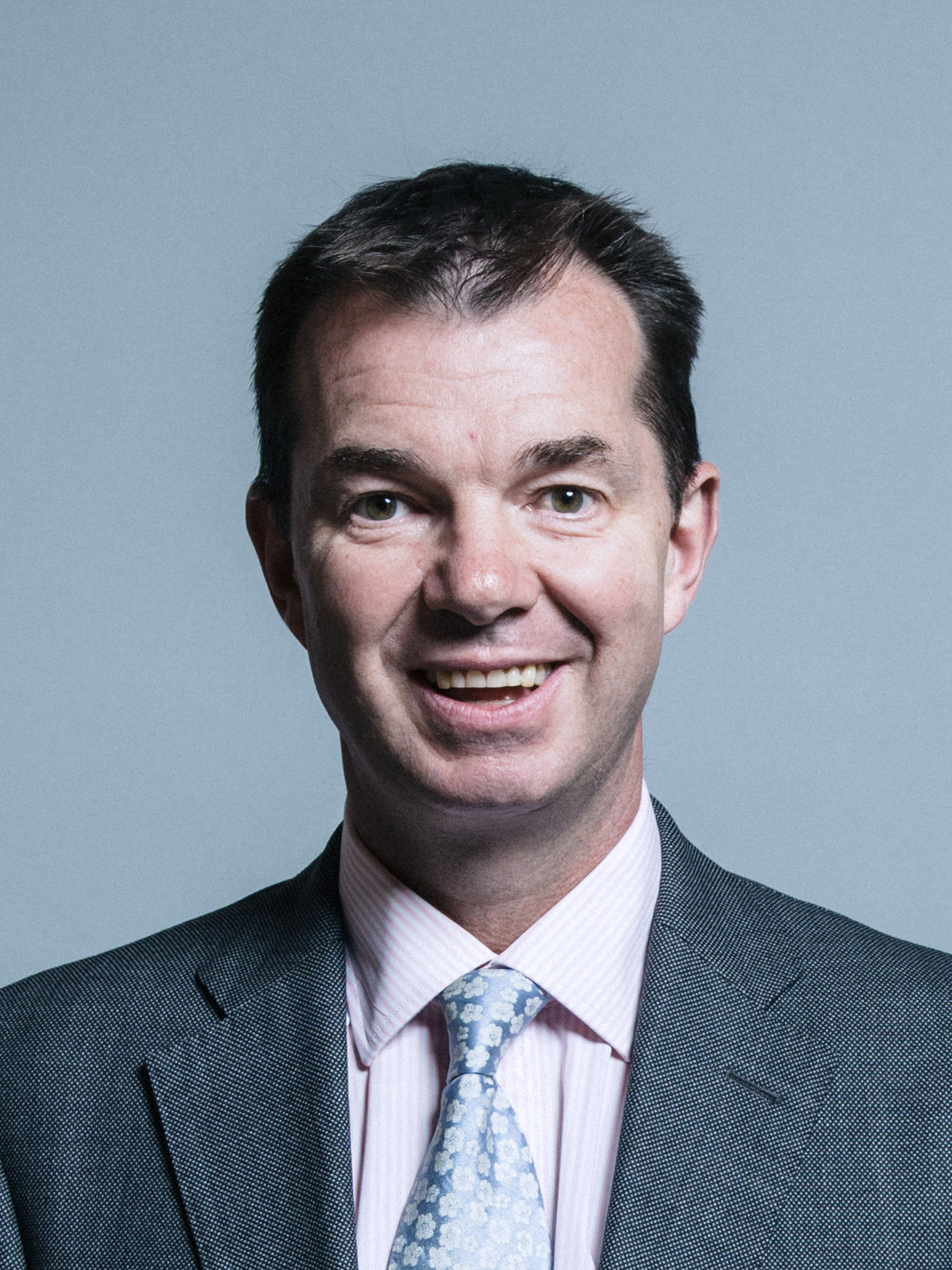
- Official portrait, 2017

Parliamentary Under-Secretary of State for Roads and Local Transport
- In office 13 November 2023 – 30 May 2024
- Prime Minister: Rishi Sunak
- Preceded by: Richard Holden
- Succeeded by: Lilian Greenwood; Simon Lightwood

Minister of State for Employment
- In office 27 October 2022 – 13 November 2023
- Prime Minister: Rishi Sunak
- Preceded by: Victoria Prentis
- Succeeded by: Jo Churchill

Parliamentary Under-Secretary of State for Pensions and Financial Inclusion
- In office 14 June 2017 – 8 September 2022 (Note: Office vacant between 7 and 8 July 2022, when Opperman resigned from the government until Boris Johnson announced his resignation as prime minister.)
- Prime Minister: Theresa May; Boris Johnson
- Preceded by: Richard Harrington
- Succeeded by: Alex Burghart

Lord Commissioner of the Treasury
- In office 17 July 2016 – 14 June 2017
- Prime Minister: Theresa May
- Preceded by: John Penrose
- Succeeded by: Heather Wheeler

Member of Parliament for Hexham
- In office 6 May 2010 – 30 May 2024
- Preceded by: Peter Atkinson
- Succeeded by: Joe Morris

Personal details
- Born: 18 May 1965 (age 61) Marlborough, Wiltshire, England
- Party: Conservative
- Spouse: Flora Coleman (m. 2017)
- Children: 4 (2 living)
- Education: Harrow School; University of Buckingham; University of Lille
- Website: guyopperman.co.uk

Guy Thomas Opperman (born 18 May 1965) is a British former politician who served as Parliamentary Under-Secretary of State for Roads and Local Transport from November 2023 to July 2024. He previously served as Parliamentary Under-Secretary of State for Pensions and Financial Inclusion at the Department for Work and Pensions between 2017 and 2022 and Minister of State for Employment from 2022 to 2023. A member of the Conservative Party, he served as the Member of Parliament (MP) for Hexham from 2010 to 2024, when he lost his seat in the general election to Joe Morris of the Labour Party.

== Early life, education and career ==
Opperman was born in Marlborough, Wiltshire, on 18 May 1965. He was educated at Harrow School, an independent all-boys boarding school. Opperman has a degree in law from the University of Buckingham and a first-class diploma from the University of Lille, in France.

Opperman was called to the bar in 1989. He spent 20 years as a barrister of which 15 years were spent predominantly at the criminal bar. He prosecuted and defended in a number of murder and rape trials.

Whilst a barrister, Opperman did many years of pro bono work with the Western Circuit Free Representation Unit and the Bar Pro Bono Unit, providing free legal assistance in hundreds of cases on behalf of Victim Support and Citizens Advice Bureau. The Times named him "Lawyer of the Week" in 2007 and was awarded the Bar Pro Bono Award by the attorney general, Lord Goldsmith, for his voluntary work on behalf of victims in Criminal Injuries Compensation Appeals. In 2009, the attorney general, Baroness Scotland, presented him with a Pro Bono Hero award in the House of Commons for his work on preventing hospital closures. He is now a "door tenant" at 3PB and is no longer in active practice at the Bar having committed to being a full-time Member of Parliament.

Opperman previously stood for election to Parliament in Swindon North at the 1997 general election and for Caernarfon at the 2005 general election. He was a councillor in Kennet from 1995 to 1999.

Opperman led a legal campaign to oppose the closure of the NHS's Savernake Hospital at Marlborough which he credited with saving his mother's life from cancer.

== Parliamentary career ==
Opperman was elected at the 2010 general election as MP for Hexham in Northumberland. He was one of the first MPs in the United Kingdom to employ an apprentice.

In September 2012 Opperman was appointed as Private Parliamentary Secretary (PPS) to Mark Harper, the immigration minister at the Home Office.

Opperman has previously described himself as "rather on the left" of the Conservative Party and has previously opposed regional pay but supported the Living wage, regional banks, and industrial activism. He called for his party to do more to show it supports "the hardworking people in our public sector". In 2012, the New Statesman magazine summarised his positions on low wages, corporate responsibility, and apprenticeships in an article called "Meet the Tories the left should be frightened of".

In 2015, Opperman was named by the Independent Parliamentary Standards Authority (IPSA) for an outstanding £161 in expenses due back. However, the IPSA subsequently apologised due to an error, stating; ''We have failed you and the public'' in a letter to Opperman.

In 2016, for the sixth successive year Opperman coordinated the collection of more than 300 toys for disadvantaged children in north east England as part of the Northumberland Conservatives' Christmas appeal, "Buy One More Toy".

Opperman was appointed as Parliamentary Under-Secretary of State at the Department for Work and Pensions on 14 June 2017. Footage from 2013 was uncovered showing him stating that he understood what it was like to live on a zero-hours contract because he once worked as a £250-per-hour barrister. Weeks later, in response to the group Women Against State Pension Inequality, he was quoted as saying that older women who face cuts to their state pension could take up apprenticeships as a route to re-employment.

Opperman displeased audience members in October 2017 when he pulled out of a pensions fringe event at the Conservative Party Conference in an apparent attempt to avoid a nearby protest staged by Women Against State Pension Inequality.

At a hustings event for the 2019 election, Opperman was asked how people using food banks could be helped. He said the Conservatives would raise the minimum wage and the tax threshold. He also suggested that people "must get better at handling money".

Opperman endorsed Rishi Sunak in both the July–September 2022 Conservative Party leadership election and the October 2022 Conservative Party leadership election.

=== Pensions Minister ===
Opperman served as Parliamentary Under-Secretary of State at the Department for Work and Pensions from June 2017 to September 2022. His brief included pensions and financial inclusion.

In October 2019, as Pensions Minister Opperman introduced new Environmental, Social and Governance regulations (ESG). These required a pension fund to update its statement of investment principles and broadly take into account ESG factors when considering its strategic approach to investment. In an article written for The Times, Opperman argued that, "Pensions should be harnessed to fight the climate emergency".

In a speech at the Pensions & Lifetime Savings Association (PLSA) investment conference in March 2020, Opperman announced the public consultation on new non-statutory guidance for trustees of occupational pensions schemes on the risks and opportunities associated with climate change.

In October 2020, the Pensions Schemes Bill returned to the House of Commons for Second Reading. Opperman said the Pension Schemes Bill will make pensions "safer, better and greener". The Bill seeks to make pensions safer by giving the pension regulator more powers to tackle pension scams, better by introducing a pension dashboard and greener by going further on climate change disclosure. In November 2020, the Bill passed the House of Commons at Third Reading and Report Stage.

On 10 June 2022, Opperman overtook Steve Webb to become the longest-serving pensions minister since the post was created in 1998. On 7 July 2022, Opperman resigned as pensions minister, making his resignation the 52nd in the July 2022 United Kingdom government crisis. He was re-appointed to the position on 8 July. Opperman would then leave his position once again on 8 September 2022, following the election of Liz Truss. Opperman was succeeded by Alex Burghart on 20 September 2022.

=== Employment Minister ===
Opperman was appointed Minister of State for Employment by Rishi Sunak on 26 October 2022. In doing so, succeeded Victoria Prentis who held the role for just 48 days. In a statement on Twitter, Opperman said he was "delighted" to be back in the Department for Work and Pensions and that he was looking forward to working with Mel Stride, the new Secretary of State for Work and Pensions.

In November 2022, Opperman launched the 50 plus champions campaign to tackle economic inactivity and unemployment within the UK workforce. In this campaign, he targeted over 50s who were out of work by creating more jobs and changing employer attitudes towards over 50 workers. Opperman stated: "Older workers are a huge asset to our country and our economy. I want to support them to get into work. An age-inclusive workforce makes business sense too. Our 50 PLUS Champions will work with leading employers across the country to connect job-ready people with the vast number of opportunities out there."

On 6 December 2022 Opperman appeared on the BBC panel show Question Time hosted by Fiona Bruce. In the programme, Opperman urged everyone to "boycott Netflix" in response to the first release of Prince Harry's and Meghan Markle's widely criticised documentary: Harry and Meghan. However, a Downing Street spokesperson, following the comment, stated that “it’s a matter for the public what channels they want to watch” and dismissed this attempted protest.

=== Transport minister ===
In the November 2023 British cabinet reshuffle, Opperman was appointed Parliamentary Under-Secretary of State for Roads and Local Transport.

== Political positions ==
=== Abortion ===
Opperman supports the right to choose and does not support any changes to the present law.

=== Assisted dying ===
Opperman has spoken in favour of changing the law on assisted dying and spoke of his anger in 2015 at the defeat of the Assisted Dying Bill. He argued that: "This Bill does not threaten the lives of vulnerable people. It will not lead to more deaths, but to less suffering".

=== Climate Change ===
Guy Opperman generally voted against measures to prevent climate change. He voted against a motion that would have forced a vote on a bill to ban fracking in October 2022.

Opperman led the campaign opposing Whittonstall and Halton Lea Gate's open cast coal mines in his constituency. He was also strongly opposed to the plans of a new open cast mine at Dewley Hill, describing the plans as a "climate change disaster waiting to happen".

=== Community banking ===
Since being elected in 2010, Opperman campaigned against payday lenders. He came together with a group of Northumbrian locals and church leaders to set up the Northumberland Community Bank. The bank was launched in 2015 by the Archbishop of York, John Sentamu. The community bank is a not-for-profit financial cooperative, offers secure savings and loan facilities as an alternative to high cost credit – with any surplus being used to enable and grow services in Northumberland.

=== Great North Air Ambulance Service ===
Opperman campaigned and introduced a motion in the House of Commons calling for a review in the fuel duty paid by the Great North Air Ambulance Service. This resulted in the Government exempting emergency services from aviation fuel duty in the 2014 Budget. The measure saved the Great North Air Ambulance up to £25,000 per year. In 2012, Opperman walked from Sheffield to Scotland and raised £2,079 for the Great North Air Ambulance service.

=== Living wage ===
On 8 August 2013, Opperman declared his support for the Living Wage in an article for the New Statesman. In this article he asked: "How and why did we let it become acceptable for a full-time job not to pay enough to live on?".

=== Same-sex marriage ===
Opperman campaigned for, spoke in favour, and voted for the Marriage (Same Sex Couples) Act in 2013. During the debate, he described the UK as being on a "journey".

Opperman later voted for an amendment supporting same-sex marriage in Northern Ireland.

=== Syria ===
In 2014, Opperman travelled to Syria, to see the impact of humanitarian aid in refugee camps on the Turkey–Syria border. He called for action for further support to children in refugee camps. Subsequently, Opperman held a specific debate in Parliament on the plight of Syria Refugees and UN Resolution 2139 relating to the provision of aid in Syria itself.

=== The Union ===
Opperman is a supporter of the Union and "passionately" campaigned for Scotland to remain in the United Kingdom during the 2014 Scottish independence referendum.

== Author, blogger and podcast host ==
In October 2012, Opperman had his first book published, Doing Time, an examination of the prison service and offender rehabilitation in the United Kingdom. In it he offers a consideration of re-offending, prisoner training, drug rehabilitation, prison management and payment by results in the prison system.

Opperman is a member of the Advisory Board of the High Pay Centre and has co-authored an essay with Green Party MP Caroline Lucas and Trades Union Congress General Secretary Frances O'Grady entitled "Better Business: Moral Matters". In the essay he contrasts community-focussed businesses in his Northumberland seat with the lack of responsibility demonstrated by the banking sector.

Opperman co-authored the report "All Hands on Deck" with Laura Farris for the Centre for Policy Studies in November 2018. The report details how businesses and employers can do more to close Britain's productivity gap by increasing flexible working.

In February 2020, Opperman launched a podcast, Beyond the Bubble. The podcast aims to look at politics from outside the traditional "Westminster Bubble", by talking to MPs and key figures. Guests have included new Conservative MPs Dehenna Davison, Sarah Atherton and Jacob Young, as well as comedian and former Labour advisor Matt Forde.

== Post-parliamentary career ==
Following his defeat at the 2024 UK General Election, Opperman has worked as a freelance advisor.

== Personal life ==
Opperman was a director of his family's engineering business until 2009. On 2 June 2017, during his general election campaign, he married his partner of four years, Flora Coleman, who is 20 years his junior. In June 2020, the couple had twin boys, who died shortly after birth.

Opperman is an amateur jockey and rode his first winner in 1985. He continues to ride and has won a number of point-to-point horse races, including at Downhills, Corbridge, just after his selection as the Conservative Party Candidate for Hexham in 2009.

Opperman has raised almost £10,000 for charity including over £4,000 in 2011 for the National Brain Appeal at the National Hospital for Neurology and Neurosurgery which he credits with saving his life after suffering from a brain tumour. He and Labour MP Paul Blomfield, who also had a brain tumour in 2011, walked the first section of the Pennine Way in 2012 to raise money for Headway UK. In 2012, Opperman walked 280 miles from Sheffield to Scotland raising £2,500 for the Great North Air Ambulance. In 2016, Opperman was shown to be tumour free in a scan 5 years since his original diagnosis.

== Notes ==
Parliament of the United Kingdom
Preceded by Peter Atkinson	Member of Parliament for Hexham; 2010–2024	Succeeded by Joe Morris
Political offices
Preceded by John Penrose	Lord Commissioner of the Treasury; 2016–2017	Succeeded by Heather Wheeler
Preceded by Richard Harrington	Parliamentary Under-Secretary of State for Pensions and Financial Inclusion; 2017–2022	Succeeded by Alex Burghart
