= Douglas Clifton Brown, 1st Viscount Ruffside =

British politician (1879–1958)

Colonel The Right Honourable The Viscount Ruffside PC JP DL
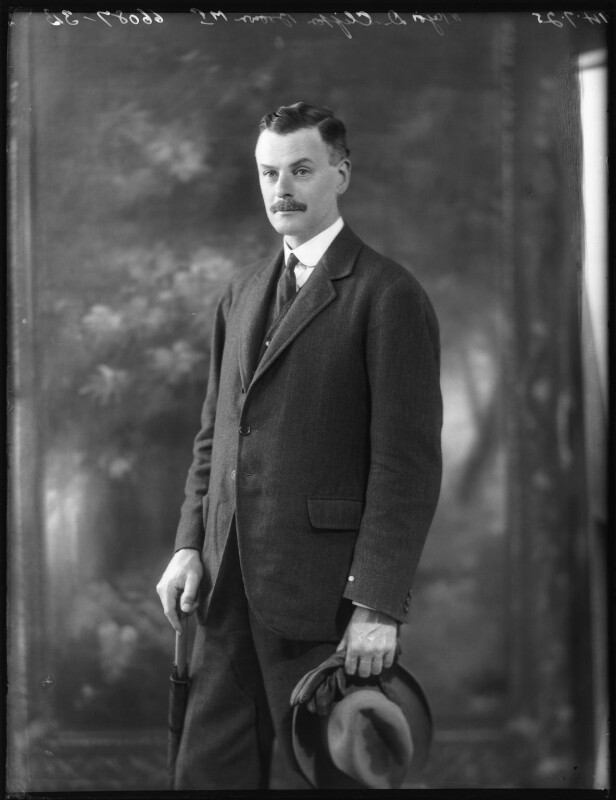
- Clifton Brown in 1925

Speaker of the House of Commons of the United Kingdom
- In office 9 March 1943 – 31 October 1951
- Monarch: George VI
- Prime Minister: Winston Churchill; Clement Attlee
- Preceded by: Edward FitzRoy
- Succeeded by: William Morrison

Deputy Speaker of the House of Commons Chairman of Ways and Means
- In office 21 January 1943 – 9 March 1943
- Speaker: Edward FitzRoy
- Preceded by: Dennis Herbert
- Succeeded by: James Milner

Deputy Chairman of Ways and Means
- In office 9 November 1938 – 20 January 1943
- Speaker: Edward FitzRoy
- Preceded by: Robert Bourne
- Succeeded by: James Milner

Member of Parliament for Hexham
- In office 29 October 1924 – 4 October 1951
- Preceded by: Victor Finney
- Succeeded by: Rupert Speir
- In office 14 December 1918 – 16 November 1923
- Preceded by: Richard Durning Holt
- Succeeded by: Victor Finney

Personal details
- Born: 16 August 1879
- Died: 5 May 1958 (aged 78)
- Party: Conservative
- Spouse: Violet Arbuthnot Wollaston (m. 1907)
- Relations: Howard Clifton Brown (brother); Sir Alexander Brown, 1st Baronet (uncle); Geoffrey Benedict Clifton-Brown (nephew); Sir Geoffrey Clifton-Brown (great-grandnephew)
- Children: Audrey Clifton Brown
- Parents: James Clifton Brown (father); Amelia Rowe Brown (mother)
- Education: Eton College
- Alma mater: Trinity College, Cambridge

Douglas Clifton Brown, 1st Viscount Ruffside, PC, JP, DL (16 August 1879 – 5 May 1958) was a British politician who was Member of Parliament (MP) for Hexham, initially (Note: As is customary, he resigned from the party upon his election as Speaker.) as a Conservative. He served as Speaker of the House of Commons from 1943 to 1951. Upon stepping down as Speaker he became the Viscount Ruffside; the peerage became extinct with his death.

== Early life ==
Clifton Brown was born on 16 August 1879. He was the fifth of ten children born to Amelia (née Rowe) Brown and Colonel James Clifton Brown, a Liberal Party Member of Parliament. His maternal grandparents were Charles Rowe, who was mixed race, due to being of African descent, and his Lima-born wife Sarah. His elder brother was Howard Clifton Brown

His paternal grandparents were Alexander Brown and his wife Sarah Benedict Brown. His great-grandfather was the banker and merchant Sir William Brown, 1st Baronet, and his uncle was Liberal politician Sir Alexander Brown, 1st Baronet.

Clifton Brown was educated at Eton and Trinity College, Cambridge.

== Career ==
Clifton Brown was on 11 April 1900 commissioned a second lieutenant in the Lancashire Artillery, a volunteer artillery regiment. He had advanced to a lieutenant in that regiment, when on 26 March 1902 he transferred to the regular army and was commissioned a second-lieutenant in the 1st Dragoon Guards, serving in South Africa during the end of the Second Boer War. He advanced to major in the regiment, and later became a lieutenant-colonel in the Volunteer force.

=== Political career ===
Mr. Speaker Clifton Brown's Retirement Act 1951 (Note: Section 2.)
- Act of Parliament
- Parliament of the United Kingdom
- Long title: An Act to settle and secure an annuity upon the Right Honourable Douglas Clifton Brown in consideration of his eminent services.
- Citation: 15 & 16 Geo. 6 & 1 Eliz. 2. c. 2
- Territorial extent: United Kingdom

Dates
- Royal assent: 7 December 1951
- Commencement: 7 December 1951 (Note: The Acts of Parliament (Commencement) Act 1793.)
- Repealed: 31 July 1963

Other legislation
- Repealed by: Statute Law Revision Act 1963

Status: Repealed

Text of statute as originally enacted

Clifton Brown was the Conservative Member of Parliament (MP) for Hexham from 1918 to 1923 and from 1924 to 1951. He was a Deputy Speaker of the House of Commons from 1938 to 1943 and Speaker of the House of Commons from 1943 to 1951. As speaker, he visited the front line shortly after the Normandy landings. It was the last trip to a war zone by a holder of the post until Sir Lindsay Hoyle went to Ukraine in March 2025. Clifton Brown was sworn of the Privy Council in 1941 and raised to the peerage as Viscount Ruffside, of Hexham in the County of Northumberland, in 1951. An act of Parliament, Mr. Speaker Clifton Brown's Retirement Act 1951 (15 & 16 Geo. 6 & 1 Eliz. 2. c. 2), was passed to provide him with a pension as former Speaker.

== Personal life ==
In 1907, Ruffside was married to Violet Cicely Kathleen Wollaston (1882–1969), daughter of Frederick Eustace Arbuthnot Wollaston. They were the parents of one child:

- Audrey Clifton Brown (1908–2002), who married Harry Hylton-Foster, who became Speaker of the House of Commons. Audrey was created a life peeress as Baroness Hylton-Foster in honour of her husband in 1965.

His grand-nephew Geoffrey Clifton-Brown has served as a Conservative MP since 1992.

Ruffside died in May 1958, aged 78. As there were no surviving male issue from the marriage, the viscountcy became extinct. His widow, the Viscountess Ruffside, died in November 1969, aged 87.

== Arms ==
Coat of arms of Douglas Clifton Brown, 1st Viscount Ruffside
| Notes Lord Ruffside was an agnate of the Brown baronets of Richmond hill. His arms, as displayed in the speaker's chamber, are the same as those in the baronets' arms. Escutcheon Gules a Chevron Or between two Bear's Paws erased in chief and four hands conjoined in saltire of the second in base on a Chief engrailed Or an Eagle displayed Sable |

== Notes ==
Parliament of the United Kingdom
| Preceded by Richard Durning Holt | Member of Parliament for Hexham; 1918–1923 | Succeeded by Victor Finney |
| Preceded by Victor Finney | Member of Parliament for Hexham; 1924–1951 | Succeeded by Rupert Speir |
Political offices
| Preceded by Robert Bourne | Deputy Chairman of Ways and Means; 1938–1943 | Succeeded by James Milner |
| Preceded by Sir Dennis Herbert | Chairman of Ways and Means; 1943 | Succeeded by James Milner |
| Preceded by Hon. Edward FitzRoy | Speaker of the House of Commons of the United Kingdom; 1943–1951 | Succeeded by William Morrison |
Peerage of the United Kingdom
| New creation | Viscount Ruffside; 1951–1958 | Extinct |
