= Miles MacInnes =

- Born: 21 February 1830
- Died: 28 September 1909 (aged 79); Rickerby Park

Miles MacInnes (21 February 1830 – 28 September 1909) was a British landowner, railway director and Liberal Party politician.

== Life ==
MacInnes was the son of General John MacInnes (1779–?) and his wife Ann Sophia Reynolds. His father left Scotland to seek his fortune in the East as an officer of the East India Company and retired to Fern Lodge, Hampstead after a successful military career.

Miles was educated at Rugby School and at Balliol College, Oxford. Because he was related to George Head Head's wife he was given a job at Head's bank in Carlisle when he was 23. He worked at that bank until 1864 when the bank was merged with another and became a trader in corn in London.

He was a Director of the London and North Western Railway and J.P. for Cumberland and Middlesex. In 1876 MacInnes acquired Rickerby Park at Carlisle. He had been adopted as heir to George Head Head and his wife who were childless. MacInnes was left £160,000 and the estate on the understanding that he would use Head's coat of arms and to use the surname "Head". Macinness did not take on the surname.

In 1885 MacInnes was elected Member of Parliament for Hexham and held the seat until 1892. However his opponent's election was declared void, and he regained the seat in a 1893 by-election, to lose it in 1895.

MacInnes married Euphemia Johnston of Holton Hall, Suffolk in 1859. He was the father of Bishop Rennie MacInnes of Jerusalem and grandfather of Archbishop Campbell MacInnes of Jerusalem.

When he died in 1909, at the age of 79, he was buried at Stanwix near the tomb of his benefactor. A steam George V class railway engine was named in his honour by the LNWR.

Parliament of the United Kingdom
New constituency	Member of Parliament for Hexham; 1885 – 1892	Succeeded by Nathaniel George Clayton
Preceded by Nathaniel George Clayton	Member of Parliament for Hexham; 1893 – 1895	Succeeded by Wentworth Beaumont
