= Victor Finney =

British politician (1897–1970)

Victor Harold Finney (13 July 1897 – 10 April 1970) was an English film company executive and Liberal Party politician.

== Family and education ==
Victor Harold Finney was the son of John T Finney of Sunderland. He was educated at Durham University where he obtained his BA degree in Modern History in 1922 and his MA in 1925. In 1928 he married Aileen Rose Whitely-Gallagher whose family originated in County Cork.

== Career ==
Finney worked in the film industry as an employee of the Rank Organisation Ltd and was a senior executive of the company from 1943–1966.

== Politics ==
=== Parliamentary candidate ===
Finney first stood for Parliament at the 1922 general election as the Liberal candidate for the Northumberland constituency of Hexham. In a three-cornered contest he came second to the sitting Conservative MP, Douglas Clifton Brown, with Labour's George Shield, later MP for Wansbeck in third place.

=== Member of Parliament ===
Finney stood again in Hexham at the 1923 general election and this time in a straight fight with Clifton Brown he won the seat by a majority of 2,406 votes. However, in 1924 the Conservative Party resurgent and with Labour again standing a candidate, Finney was unable to retain his seat which reverted to Clifton Brown who then held it until 1951 when he was created Viscount Ruffside. Finney did not stand for Parliament again.

=== Lloyd George's Council of Action ===
On 12 June 1935, David Lloyd George launched a political campaign with the publication of a manifesto, signed mainly by nonconformist church leaders, attacking the government for the failure of its domestic and foreign policies. The document announced the setting up of non-party, Council of Action for Peace and Reconstruction to be established by a convention to be held at Caxton Hall, Westminster on 1 July 1935. The Council was apparently inspired by the New Deal of President Franklin D Roosevelt.

There followed an initial statement, quickly withdrawn, that the Council of Action would stand up to 350 candidates at the next general election. Lloyd George's plan seems to have been to frighten Prime Minister Stanley Baldwin with the prospect of Labour wins in many constituencies as a result of the intervention of Council of Action candidates, where supported by the local Liberal parties and to get his National Government to make policy concessions in areas favoured by Lloyd George. It also seems to have been a convenient device for Lloyd George to get out of political commitments which he did not wish to enter. His secretary, A J Sylvester, recorded that he often used his association with the Council, as a non-political body, to avoid meetings based on party politics.

Victor Finney was a strong supporter of this campaign and its objectives. He went on to become the organising secretary of the Council of Action at its headquarters in Abbey Street, Westminster and later at Horseferry House, Horseferry Road just behind Lloyd George's own offices in Thames House. He often accompanied Lloyd George to meetings in Britain and abroad and was a regular visitor to north Wales. By the time of the 1935 general election in November however, the Council of Action was finding it hard to make a real impact. It published two booklets on Peace and Reconstruction and sent a questionnaire to all candidates but Lloyd George himself did not campaign nationally as its figurehead. The National Government was re-elected and although sixty-seven candidates endorsed by the Council of Action won seats in Parliament, they never tried to behave as a group. Finney recognised that the Council of Action could only be a success if Lloyd George committed to it more actively and permanently but he was not able to persuade him so while the Council of Action was kept going until 1940, it was unable to exercise much political influence.

During his time working with Lloyd George, Finney came under the Welshman's suspicion of having an affair with Frances Stevenson Lloyd George's long-time secretary and lover, later his second wife. During a meeting in Antibes in 1938, Lloyd George was discovered listening at a wall, apparently fearful that Finney and Frances Stevenson were engaged in a secret liaison in the next room. No one else seems to have given the idea of affair any credence and it has been put down to Lloyd George's increasing jealousy and his tendency to judge everyone else by his own, lax, sexual standards. Lloyd George kept up the paranoia into 1939 with his secretary recording that he often looked into Frances Stevenson's room in the dead of night to make sure Finney was not with her.

== Death ==
Finney died on 10 April 1970 aged 72 years.

Parliament of the United Kingdom
Preceded by Douglas Clifton Brown	Member of Parliament for Hexham; 1923–1924	Succeeded by Douglas Clifton Brown
