= Charles Loftus Bates =

British Army officer

Brigadier-General Sir Charles Loftus Bates KCMG CB DSO DL
- Born: 2 August 1863; Aydon, Northumberland, England
- Died: 1951 (aged 87)
- Military career
- Allegiance: United Kingdom
- Branch: British Army
- Service years: 1881–1896; 1899–1902; 1903–1919
- Rank: Brigadier-General
- Units: 1st (King's) Dragoon Guards; Northumberland Hussars; 5th Battalion Imperial Yeomanry
- Commands: Northumberland Hussars; Director Remounts Egyptian Expeditionary Force
- Conflicts: Second Boer War; First World War
- Awards: Knight Commander of the Order of St Michael and St George; Companions of the Order of the Bath; Companion of the Distinguished Service Order
- Other work: Prospective Conservative Member of Parliament; Coal Mine Director; Chairman, Racecourse Owners Association

Brigadier-General Sir Charles Loftus Bates KCMG CB DSO DL (2 August 1863 – 1951) was a British Army officer who served in the Second Boer War and the First World War. He was a cavalry officer in the 1st (King's) Dragoon Guards and the commanding officer (CO) of the Northumberland Hussars, part of the Yeomanry reserve.

He stood as the prospective Conservative Member of Parliament for Hexham and became the Chairman of the Race Course Owners Association and several coal companies.

== History ==
Charles Loftus Bates was born 2 August 1863, at Aydon, Northumberland, the son of Thomas Bates. He was educated at Eton College. He became a second lieutenant in the Northumberland Militia Artillery in January 1881, before joining the Regular Army as a lieutenant in the 1st (King's) Dragoon Guards in January 1884. He served in this cavalry regiment until 10 March 1896, when as a captain, he resigned his commission. He was later appointed a captain in the Reserve.

=== Reserve ===
Following the outbreak of the Second Boer War in late 1899, Bates volunteered for service with the Imperial Yeomanry, where he was commissioned a captain on 7 February 1900. He left Liverpool for South Africa the same week, and served with the 5th Battalion Imperial Yeomanry. On 18 October 1901 he was promoted to major in the yeomanry regiment the Northumberland Hussars, while still serving as a captain with the Imperial Yeomanry in South Africa. After the end of the war, he relinquished his active commission in the Imperial Yeomanry in October 1902, and received the permanent rank of major on 18 October 1902 for his service. He was severely wounded during the war, and appointed a Companion of the Distinguished Service Order (DSO) for his service.

Returning home, he was granted the honorary rank of lieutenant-colonel in the Northumberland Hussars on 8 May 1903. He became a substantive lieutenant-colonel and commanding officer (CO) of the Northumberland Hussars on 24 March 1905, was given the honorary rank of colonel on 4 August 1905, and in May 1913 was appointed as the Colonel of the Regiment for the Northumberland Hussars.

=== First World War ===
Three months after the start of the First World War, on 10 November 1914, his reputation with horses led to his appointment as the deputy director of Remounts for the British Expeditionary Force (BEF) on the Western Front. Then, while holding the temporary rank of brigadier-general, he relinquished that post on 17 December 1915. The next month, on 11 January 1916, he was invested as a Companion of the Order of St Michael and St George. Leaving the Western Front, he was posted to Egypt, and took up the post of Director of Remounts for the Sinai and Palestine campaign. He remained in the Middle East for the remainder of the war, and was awarded the Order of the White Eagle 3rd Class with Swords on 19 February 1917, and was also mentioned in despatches.

On 29 April 1919, five months after the Armistice with Germany, he relinquished his appointment and was granted the honorary rank of brigadier-general, and was invested as a Knight Commander of the Order of St Michael and St George.

=== Civilian life ===
On 27 April 1892, at St Mary's Catholic Church, Hexham, Bates married Katharine Leadbitter, daughter of Edward Leadbitter, from Spittal, Northumberland. They had one son, Edward Giles Bates, who served in the Northumberland Fusiliers (later the Royal Northumberland Fusiliers) in the First World War. He was an active Conservative, contesting the seat of Hexham in both a 1907 by-election and the 1910 general election. The next year, in December 1911, he was appointed as the Deputy Lieutenant for the County of Northumberland.

After the First World War he was appointed Chairman of the Race Course Owners Association. Then in later life he became Chairman of the Bedlington Coal Company Limited (1923–1947), Director of the Wallsend and Hebburn Coal Company Limited (1940–1947), and Director of the Hartley Main Collieries from 1947. Charles Loftus Bates died at his family home in 1951 at the age of 87.
