= Peter Atkinson (politician) =

British Conservative Party politician

Member of Parliament for Hexham
- In office 9 April 1992 – 12 April 2010
- Preceded by: Alan Amos
- Succeeded by: Guy Opperman

Parliamentary Private Secretary
- In office 1994–1997

Personal details
- Born: 19 January 1943 (age 83) Corbridge, Northumberland England
- Party: Conservative
- Spouse: Brione Darley
- Children: 2 daughters
- Website: http://www.peteratkinson.com/

Peter Landreth Atkinson (born 19 January 1943) is a British Conservative Party politician. He was the member of parliament for Hexham from 1992 until 2010.

== Early life ==
Atkinson was educated at Cheltenham College and after leaving school he became a journalist and joined the Newcastle Journal in November 1968. He moved to London to work on the Evening Standard as a reporter, eventually becoming News Editor.

In 1982 he left to join a free newspaper company which grew to fifteen titles. He left to become deputy director of the British Field Sports Society with responsibility for political and public affairs.

His political career began in 1978 when he was elected to Wandsworth Council. He left the Council in 1982 and became a member of Wandsworth Health Authority (1982–88) and later a Suffolk County Councillor (1989–1992), until his election as MP for Hexham.

== Parliamentary career ==
Atkinson was elected at the 1992 general election for the seat of Hexham with a majority of 13,438. At the 1997 election he was narrowly re-elected with a majority of just 222, but at the 2001 and 2005 elections his majority increased again, to 2,529 and 5,020 respectively.

From 1994 to 1997 Atkinson was a Parliamentary Private Secretary to a number of ministers in the Conservative government. After 1997 he alternated between serving on the Chairmen's Panel and working in the Conservative whips office.

In 1995 Atkinson blocked a Private Members Bill on the live export of veal calves by reading from the London telephone directory in Parliament to use up all the debating time, a technique known as filibustering.

Atkinson is one of the 98 MPs who voted to keep their expense details secret.

On 19 June 2008, Atkinson announced he would not stand at the next general election.

== Personal life ==
Atkinson married Brione Darley in 1976 and they have two grown-up daughters.

Parliament of the United Kingdom
Preceded by Alan Amos	Member of Parliament for Hexham; 1992 – 2010	Succeeded by Guy Opperman
