= Inside the Beltway =

Idiom referring to issues related to the U.S. federal government

The Capital Beltway around Washington, DC

"Inside the Beltway" is an American idiom used to characterize matters of greater interest to U.S. federal government officials, contractors, lobbyists, and media personnel, than to the general public. The Capital Beltway (Interstate 495) is a highway that has encircled Washington, D.C. since 1964. Some speakers of American English now use "beltway" as a metonym for federal government insiders (cf. Beltway bandits). Multiple political columns are titled after the phrase, including The Washington Times, American University's magazine, and columnist John McCaslin.

Geographically, Inside the Beltway describes Washington, D.C., and those sections of Maryland and Virginia that lie within the perimeter of the Capital Beltway.

== Usage ==
Reporting in 1975 on the prospect of a reexamination of the Warren Commission's findings concerning the assassination of John F. Kennedy, newspaper journalist Nicholas M. Horrock wrote:

In the White House of Richard M. Nixon, it was said that Watergate would become serious only if it 'got outside the Washington Beltway', if the depths of the disgrace were understood by the American people. In 1974, the truth of Watergate flooded the country, and the Nixon presidency ended. It can be said that the myriad doubts about the Warren Commission's findings in the death of President Kennedy represent a reverse situation. The doubts would never be taken seriously until they were inside the Beltway, in the halls of Congress, the courts and the White House.

— Nicholas M. Horrock, (October 12, 1975) The New York Times: p. 230.

== Communities ==
The following cities and counties are located entirely or partially inside the Beltway:

- Washington, D.C. (entirely)
- Alexandria, Virginia (entirely)
- Arlington County, Virginia (entirely)
- Fairfax County, Virginia (partially)
- Falls Church, Virginia (entirely)
- Montgomery County, Maryland (partially)
- Prince George's County, Maryland (partially)

== See also ==
- Washington metropolitan area
- Westminster Bubble
