= Hexham (constituency) =

Parliamentary constituency in the United Kingdom, 1885 onwards

Coordinates: 55.03°N 2.15°W

- County constituency for the House of Commons
- Interactive map of boundaries since 2024
- Boundary within North East England
- County: Northumberland
- Electorate: 72,738 (March 2020)
- Major settlements: Hexham, Corbridge, Stocksfield, Ponteland, Prudhoe, Wylam, Haydon Bridge, Haltwhistle

Current constituency
- Created: 1885
- Member of Parliament: Joe Morris (Labour)
- Seats: One
- Created from: North Northumberland and South Northumberland

Hexham is a constituency (Note: A county constituency (for the purposes of election expenses and type of returning officer)) in Northumberland represented in the House of Commons of the UK Parliament since 2024 by Joe Morris of the Labour Party. As with all constituencies, the constituency elects one Member of Parliament (MP) by the first past the post system of election at least every five years.

The seat was created as one of four single member divisions of the county of Northumberland under the Redistribution of Seats Act 1885.

== Constituency profile ==
The largest constituency by land area in England since the 2024 boundary changes, Hexham reaches to the Pennines and is traversed by Hadrian's Wall, which runs almost due east–west through England. It includes substantial agricultural holdings, forestry, wood processing, food, minerals, and manufactured hardware industries. In the midst of the northwest of the constituency is Kielder Water; running between this area and the middle of the seat is the southern portion of Kielder Forest, and in the west, the attractions of the precipitous Haltwhistle Burn, Viaduct and Castle. SSE of Hexham is the Derwent Reservoir. As well as those rural areas, the constituency also includes part of Newcastle's middle-class commuter suburbs.

Despite the generally middle-class composition of the population, there are also some more working-class areas: Prudhoe frequently elects Labour councillors and has demographics similar to neighbouring parts of Blaydon, a strongly Labour town in the Blaydon and Consett constituency. There is also some deprivation in rural areas, particularly around Haltwhistle. Based on the latest published old age dependency ratios, a slightly larger than average level of the population is retired.

An estimate by the House of Commons Library puts the Leave vote by the constituency in the 2016 referendum at 45%.

== History ==
Hexham was considered a safe seat for the Conservative Party, having been under their control for almost a century, with generally safe majorities, from 1924 until it was gained by Labour in 2024. It was the only Conservative seat in the North East between the New Labour years in government from 1997–2010, and the only one in Northumberland from 1973 until the Conservatives gained Berwick-upon-Tweed from the Liberal Democrats in 2015. It was also the northernmost seat won by the Conservatives in 1997, in what would be their worst landslide defeat at any general election of the twentieth century; with all Conservative MPs in Scotland and Wales unseated that year. In 1997, the Labour Party was very close to winning the seat, but the Conservatives retained it with a significantly reduced narrow majority of 222 votes.

In 2024, Labour won the seat for the first time on a swing of 14.9% and a majority of 7.2%, despite the fact that it was one of the few seats where Reform UK did not stand.

== Boundaries ==
=== Historic ===
1885–1918: The Sessional Divisions of Bellingham, Coquetdale West, Haltwhistle, and Tynedale.

The contents of the county division were defined by the Redistribution of Seats Act 1885.

1918–1950: The Rural Districts of Bellingham, Haltwhistle, Hexham, and the part of the Rural District of Castle Ward which consists of the civil parishes of Bitchfield, Black Heddon, Capheaton, Cheeseburn Grange, East Matfen, Fenwick, Harlow Hill, Hawkwell, Heugh, Ingoe, Kearsley, Kirkheaton, Nesbitt, Ouston, Ryal, Wallridge and West Matfen, and the Urban Districts of Hexham and Prudhoe.

Rothbury was transferred to Berwick-upon-Tweed.

1950–1974: The Urban Districts of Hexham and Prudhoe, and the Rural Districts of Bellingham, Castle Ward, Haltwhistle, Hexham.

The remainder of Castle Ward was transferred from the abolished constituency of Wansbeck.

1974–1983: The urban districts of Hexham and Prudhoe, and the rural districts of Bellingham, Castle Ward, Haltwhistle, and Hexham.

The boundary with Blyth was slightly amended to take account of changes to local government boundaries.

1983–2010: The District of Tynedale, and the following wards of the Borough of Castle Morpeth: Heddon-on-the-Wall, Ponteland East, Ponteland North, Ponteland South, Ponteland West, Stamfordham, Stannington, and Whalton.

Contents changed following reorganisation of local authorities in 1974. The area of the former rural district of Castle Ward which was now part of the City of Newcastle upon Tyne in Tyne and Wear was now included in Newcastle upon Tyne North.

Map of boundaries 2010–2024

2010–2024: The District of Tynedale, and the following wards of the Borough of Castle Morpeth: Heddon-on-the-Wall, Ponteland East, Ponteland North, Ponteland South, Ponteland West, Stamfordham, and Stannington.

In the fifth periodic boundary review of parliamentary representation in Northumberland, which came into effect for the 2010 general election, the contents of the existing Hexham constituency were unchanged except for losing the southern part of the Hartburn ward to Berwick-upon-Tweed, and the Boundary Commission for England made only minor changes in Northumberland to take account of ward boundary changes.

In 2009, a further government reorganisation resulted in the abolition of all local government boroughs and districts in Northumberland and the establishment of the county as a unitary authority. However, this did not affect the constituency boundaries.

=== Current ===
Further to the 2023 review of Westminster constituencies, which came into effect for the 2024 general election, the composition of the constituency was defined as follows (as they existed on 1 December 2020):

- The City of Newcastle upon Tyne ward of Callerton & Throckley;
- The County of Northumberland electoral divisions of Bellingham, Bywell, Corbridge, Haltwhistle, Haydon and Hadrian, Hexham Central with Acomb, Hexham East, Hexham West, Humshaugh, Longhorsley, Ponteland East and Stannington, Ponteland North, Ponteland South with Heddon, Ponteland West, Prudhoe North, Prudhoe South, South Tynedale, and Stocksfield and Broomhaugh.

The seat was expanded to bring the electorate within the permitted range by adding the Newcastle ward of Callerton & Throckley. The boundaries within Northumberland were adjusted slightly to take account of a reorganisation of local authority electoral divisions.

Following local government boundary reviews in both local authorities, the constituency now comprises the following:

- Parts of the City of Newcastle upon Tyne wards of Kingston Park & Dinnington (small part including the village of Woolsington), Newbiggin Hall & Callerton (small part including the village of Callerton), and Throckley, Wallbottle & Newburn (nearly all);
- The County of Northumberland electoral divisions of Bellingham, Choppington and Hepscott (part including Hepscott), Corbridge, Haltwhistle, Haydon and Hadrian, Hexham East, Hexham North, Hexham West, Humshaugh, Longhorsley (part), Ponteland East and Stannington, Ponteland North, Ponteland South with Heddon, Ponteland West, Prudhoe North and Wylam, Prudhoe South, Prudhoe West and Mickley, South Tynedale, and Stocksfield and Bywell.

== Members of Parliament ==
Colonel Douglas Clifton Brown, who was Speaker of the House of Commons during the latter years of the World War II, represented the seat for two separate tenures (from 1918–23, and again from 1924–51).

Year	Member	Party
1885	Miles MacInnes	Liberal
1892	Nathaniel Clayton	Conservative
1893	Miles MacInnes	Liberal
1895	Wentworth Beaumont	Liberal
1907	Richard Durning Holt	Liberal
1918	Douglas Clifton Brown	Unionist
1923	Victor Finney	Liberal
1924	Douglas Clifton Brown	Unionist
1943	Douglas Clifton Brown	Speaker
1951	Rupert Speir	Conservative
1966	Geoffrey Rippon	Conservative
1987	Alan Amos	Conservative
1992	Peter Atkinson	Conservative
2010	Guy Opperman	Conservative
2024	Joe Morris	Labour

== Elections ==
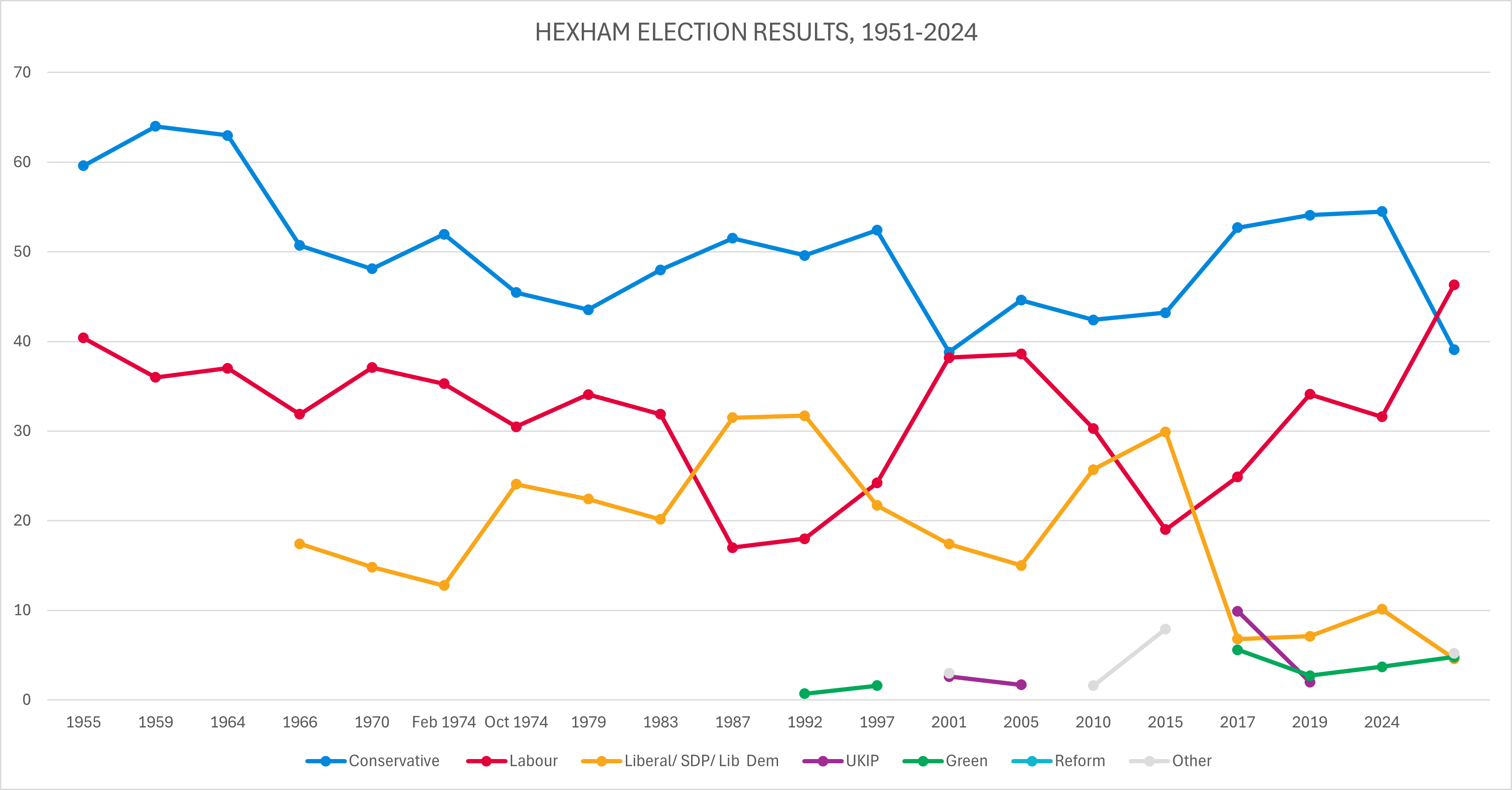
Election results 1951–2024

=== Elections in the 2020s ===
General election 2024: Hexham
Party	Candidate	Votes	%	±%
Labour	Joe Morris	23,988	46.3	+14.6
Conservative	Guy Opperman	20,275	39.1	−15.2
Green	Nick Morphet	2,467	4.8	+1.2
Liberal Democrats	Nick Cott	2,376	4.6	−4.8
Independent	Chris Whaley	1,511	2.9	N/A
SDP	William Clouston	1,211	2.3	N/A
Majority		3,713	7.2	N/A
Turnout		51,828	67.8	−6.4
Labour gain from Conservative		Swing	+14.9	

=== Elections in the 2010s ===
General election 2019: Hexham
Party	Candidate	Votes	%	±%
Conservative	Guy Opperman	25,152	54.5	+0.4
Labour	Penny Grennan	14,603	31.6	−2.5
Liberal Democrats	Stephen Howse	4,672	10.1	+3.0
Green	Nick Morphet	1,723	3.7	+1.0
Majority		10,549	22.9	+2.9
Turnout		46,150	75.3	+0.2
Conservative hold		Swing	+1.5	

General election 2017: Hexham
Party	Candidate	Votes	%	±%
Conservative	Guy Opperman	24,996	54.1	+1.4
Labour Co-op	Stephen Powers	15,760	34.1	+9.2
Liberal Democrats	Fiona Hall	3,285	7.1	+0.3
Green	Wesley Foot	1,253	2.7	−2.9
UKIP	Francis Miles	930	2.0	−7.9
Majority		9,236	20.0	−7.8
Turnout		46,224	75.1	+3.6
Conservative hold		Swing	-3.9	

General election 2015: Hexham
Party	Candidate	Votes	%	±%
Conservative	Guy Opperman	22,834	52.7	+9.5
Labour	Liam Carr	10,803	24.9	+5.9
UKIP	David Nicholson	4,302	9.9	New
Liberal Democrats	Jeff Reid	2,961	6.8	−23.1
Green	Lee Williscroft-Ferris	2,445	5.6	New
Majority		12,031	27.8	+9.5
Turnout		43,345	71.5	+0.7
Conservative hold		Swing	+1.8	

General election 2010: Hexham
Party	Candidate	Votes	%	±%
Conservative	Guy Opperman	18,795	43.2	+0.8
Liberal Democrats	Andrew Duffield	13,007	29.9	+4.2
Labour	Antoine Tinnion	8,253	19.0	−11.4
Independent	Steven Ford	1,974	4.5	New
BNP	Quentin Hawkins	1,205	2.8	New
Independent	Colin Moss	249	0.6	New
Majority		5,788	13.3	+1.2
Turnout		43,483	70.8	+2.2
Conservative hold		Swing	-1.7	

=== Elections in the 2000s ===
General election 2005: Hexham
Party	Candidate	Votes	%	±%
Conservative	Peter Atkinson	17,605	42.4	−2.2
Labour	Kevin Graham	12,585	30.3	−8.3
Liberal Democrats	Andrew Duffield	10,673	25.7	+10.7
English Democrat	Ian Riddell	521	1.3	New
Imperial	Thomas Davison	129	0.3	New
Majority		5,020	12.1	+6.1
Turnout		41,513	68.8	−2.1
Conservative hold		Swing	+3.0	

General election 2001: Hexham
Party	Candidate	Votes	%	±%
Conservative	Peter Atkinson	18,917	44.6	+5.8
Labour	Paul Brannen	16,388	38.6	+0.4
Liberal Democrats	Philip Latham	6,380	15.0	−2.4
UKIP	Alan Patterson	728	1.7	−0.9
Majority		2,529	6.0	+5.4
Turnout		42,413	70.9	−6.6
Conservative hold		Swing		

=== Elections in the 1990s ===
General election 1997: Hexham
Party	Candidate	Votes	%	±%
Conservative	Peter Atkinson	17,701	38.8	−13.6
Labour	Ian McMinn	17,479	38.2	+14.0
Liberal Democrats	Philip Carr	7,959	17.4	−4.3
Referendum	Robert Waddell	1,362	3.0	New
UKIP	David Lott	1,170	2.6	New
Majority		222	0.6	−27.6
Turnout		45,671	77.5	−4.9
Conservative hold		Swing	+13.8	

General election 1992: Hexham
Party	Candidate	Votes	%	±%
Conservative	Peter Atkinson	24,967	52.4	+2.8
Labour	Ian Swithenbank	11,529	24.2	+6.2
Liberal Democrats	Jonathan Wallace	10,344	21.7	−10.0
Green	John Hartshorne	781	1.6	+0.9
Majority		13,438	28.2	+10.3
Turnout		47,621	82.4	+2.4
Conservative hold		Swing	−1.7	

=== Elections in the 1980s ===
General election 1987: Hexham
Party	Candidate	Votes	%	±%
Conservative	Alan Amos	22,370	49.6	−1.9
Liberal	Euan Robson	14,304	31.7	+0.2
Labour	Mike Wood	8,103	18.0	+1.0
Green	Sheila Wood	336	0.7	New
Majority		8,066	17.9	−2.1
Turnout		45,113	80.0	+6.6
Conservative hold		Swing		

General election 1983: Hexham
Party	Candidate	Votes	%	±%
Conservative	Geoffrey Rippon	21,374	51.5	+3.5
Liberal	Euan Robson	13,066	31.5	+11.4
Labour	Stephen Byers	7,056	17.0	−14.9
Majority		8,308	20.0	+3.9
Turnout		41,496	73.4	−6.1
Conservative hold		Swing		

=== Elections in the 1970s ===
General election 1979: Hexham
Party	Candidate	Votes	%	±%
Conservative	Geoffrey Rippon	25,483	47.98	
Labour	Stuart Bell	16,935	31.88	
Liberal	John Shipley	10,697	20.14	
Majority		8,548	16.10	
Turnout		53,115	79.50	
Conservative hold		Swing		

General election October 1974: Hexham
Party	Candidate	Votes	%	±%
Conservative	Geoffrey Rippon	21,352	43.53	
Labour	Eric Wade	16,711	34.07	
Liberal	Roy Cairncross	10,991	22.41	
Majority		4,641	9.46	
Turnout		49,054	75.37	
Conservative hold		Swing		

General election February 1974: Hexham
Party	Candidate	Votes	%	±%
Conservative	Geoffrey Rippon	24,059	45.46	
Labour	Eric Wade	16,129	30.48	
Liberal	Roy Cairncross	12,730	24.06	
Majority		7,930	14.98	
Turnout		52,918	82.62	
Conservative hold		Swing		

General election 1970: Hexham
Party	Candidate	Votes	%	±%
Conservative	Geoffrey Rippon	24,516	51.96	
Labour	John E Miller	16,645	35.28	
Liberal	David Cogan	6,021	12.76	
Majority		7,871	16.68	
Turnout		47,182	75.31	
Conservative hold		Swing		

=== Elections in the 1960s ===
General election 1966: Hexham
Party	Candidate	Votes	%	±%
Conservative	Geoffrey Rippon	20,889	48.10	
Labour Co-op	James B. Lamb	16,105	37.08	
Liberal	Douglas A. Robson	6,434	14.82	
Majority		4,784	11.02	
Turnout		43,428	78.05	
Conservative hold		Swing		

General election 1964: Hexham
Party	Candidate	Votes	%	±%
Conservative	Rupert Speir	22,468	50.70	
Labour	John Alderson	14,127	31.88	
Liberal	Douglas A. Robson	7,722	17.42	New
Majority		8,341	18.82	
Turnout		44,317	81.88	
Conservative hold		Swing		

=== Elections in the 1950s ===
General election 1959: Hexham
Party	Candidate	Votes	%	±%
Conservative	Rupert Speir	25,500	62.99	
Labour	Wilfrid Roberts	14,980	37.01	
Majority		10,520	25.98	
Turnout		40,480	81.11	
Conservative hold		Swing		

General election 1955: Hexham
Party	Candidate	Votes	%	±%
Conservative	Rupert Speir	23,462	64.00	
Labour	Edward Garrett	13,198	36.00	
Majority		10,264	28.00	
Turnout		36,660	77.28	
Conservative hold		Swing		

General election 1951: Hexham
Party	Candidate	Votes	%	±%
Conservative	Rupert Speir	23,267	59.61	New
Labour Co-op	Thomas L. MacDonald	15,768	40.39	
Majority		7,499	19.22	N/A
Turnout		39,035	82.42	
Conservative gain from Speaker		Swing		

General election 1950: Hexham
Party	Candidate	Votes	%	±%
Speaker	Douglas Clifton Brown	24,703	85.60	
Independent Liberal	Alexander Hancock	4,154	14.40	New
Majority		20,549	71.66	
Turnout		28,857	61.88	
Speaker hold		Swing		

=== Elections in the 1940s ===
General election 1945: Hexham
Party	Candidate	Votes	%	±%
Speaker	Douglas Clifton Brown	16,431	58.23	
Labour	Ernest Kavanagh	11,786	41.77	
Majority		4,645	16.46	
Turnout		28,217	73.80	
Speaker hold		Swing		

- 1943: Douglas Clifton-Brown becomes Speaker of the House of Commons.

=== Elections in the 1930s ===
General election 1935: Hexham
Party	Candidate	Votes	%	±%
Conservative	Douglas Clifton Brown	17,241	62.55	
Labour	Ernest Kinghorn	10,324	37.45	
Majority		6,917	25.10	
Turnout		27,565	75.92	
Conservative hold		Swing		

General election 1931: Hexham
Party	Candidate	Votes	%	±%
Conservative	Douglas Clifton Brown	20,578	73.14	
Labour	E. O. Dunnico	7,557	26.86	
Majority		13,021	46.28	
Turnout		28,135	79.21	
Conservative hold		Swing		

=== Elections in the 1920s ===
General election 1929: Hexham
Party	Candidate	Votes	%	±%
Unionist	Douglas Clifton Brown	11,069	39.1	−8.9
Liberal	Francis Acland	9,103	32.2	+2.9
Labour	Ernest Owen Dunnico	8,135	28.7	+6.0
Majority		1,966	6.9	−11.8
Turnout		28,307	80.2	−2.0
Registered electors		35,304		
Unionist hold		Swing	−5.9	

General election 1924: Hexham
Party	Candidate	Votes	%	±%
Unionist	Douglas Clifton Brown	10,741	48.0	+4.0
Liberal	Victor Finney	6,551	29.3	−26.7
Labour	Charles Flynn	5,089	22.7	New
Majority		4,190	18.7	N/A
Turnout		22,381	82.2	+6.6
Registered electors		27,237		
Unionist gain from Liberal		Swing	+15.4	

General election 1923: Hexham
Party	Candidate	Votes	%	±%
Liberal	Victor Finney	11,293	56.0	+25.0
Unionist	Douglas Clifton Brown	8,887	44.0	−0.8
Majority		2,406	12.0	N/A
Turnout		20,180	75.6	−3.7
Registered electors		26,732		
Liberal gain from Unionist		Swing	+12.9	

General election 1922: Hexham
Party	Candidate	Votes	%	±%
Unionist	Douglas Clifton Brown	9,369	44.8	−4.1
Liberal	Victor Finney	6,486	31.0	+6.1
Labour	George Shield	5,050	24.2	−2.0
Majority		2,883	13.8	−8.9
Turnout		20,905	79.3	+16.9
Registered electors		26,372		
Unionist hold		Swing	−5.1	

=== Elections in the 1910s ===
General election 1918: Hexham
Party		Candidate	Votes	%	±%
C	Unionist	Douglas Clifton Brown	7,763	48.9	+3.1
	Labour	William Weir	4,168	26.2	New
	Liberal	Wentworth Beaumont	3,948	24.9	−29.3
Majority			3,595	22.7	N/A
Turnout			15,879	62.4	−21.0
Registered electors			25,341		
	Unionist gain from Liberal		Swing	+16.2	
C indicates candidate endorsed by the coalition government.

General Election 1914–15:

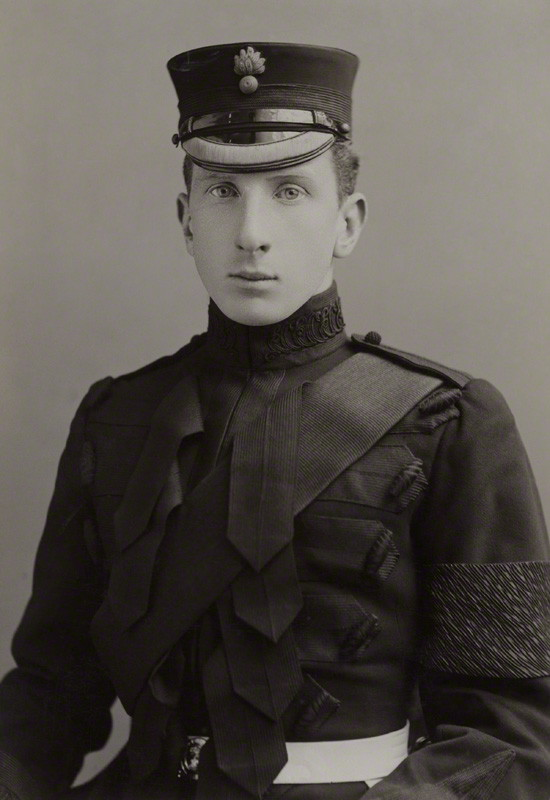
Percy

Another General Election was required to take place before the end of 1915. The political parties had been making preparations for an election to take place and by July 1914, the following candidates had been selected:

- Liberal: Richard Durning Holt
- Unionist: Alan Percy

Holt

General election December 1910: Hexham
Party	Candidate	Votes	%	±%
Liberal	Richard Durning Holt	5,124	54.2	−1.2
Conservative	Alfred Henry Chaytor	4,334	45.8	+1.2
Majority		790	8.4	−2.4
Turnout		9,458	83.4	−3.9
Registered electors		11,335		
Liberal hold		Swing	−1.2	

General election January 1910: Hexham
Party	Candidate	Votes	%	±%
Liberal	Richard Durning Holt	5,478	55.4	−6.0
Conservative	Charles Loftus Bates	4,417	44.6	+6.0
Majority		1,061	10.8	−12.0
Turnout		9,895	87.3	+4.2
Registered electors		11,335		
Liberal hold		Swing	−6.0	

=== Elections in the 1900s ===
1907 Hexham by-election
Party	Candidate	Votes	%	±%
Liberal	Richard Durning Holt	5,401	56.0	−5.4
Conservative	Charles Loftus Bates	4,244	44.0	+5.4
Majority		1,157	12.0	−10.8
Turnout		9,645	86.8	+3.7
Registered electors		11,116		
Liberal hold		Swing	−5.4	

General election 1906: Hexham
Party	Candidate	Votes	%	±%
Liberal	Wentworth Beaumont	5,632	61.4	+10.3
Conservative	Nathaniel George Clayton	3,547	38.6	−10.3
Majority		2,085	22.8	+20.6
Turnout		9,179	83.1	+3.5
Registered electors		11,049		
Liberal hold		Swing	+10.3	

Morpeth

General election 1900: Hexham
Party	Candidate	Votes	%	±%
Liberal	Wentworth Beaumont	4,197	51.1	−1.5
Liberal Unionist	Charles Howard	4,011	48.9	+1.5
Majority		186	2.2	−3.0
Turnout		8,208	79.6	−2.2
Registered electors		10,310		
Liberal hold		Swing	−1.5	

=== Elections in the 1890s ===
Beaumont

General election 1895: Hexham
Party	Candidate	Votes	%	±%
Liberal	Wentworth Beaumont	4,438	52.6	+3.1
Conservative	Charles Edward Hunter	4,003	47.4	−3.1
Majority		435	5.2	N/A
Turnout		8,441	81.8	+0.4
Registered electors		10,316		
Liberal gain from Conservative		Swing	+3.1	

1893 Hexham by-election
Party	Candidate	Votes	%	±%
Liberal	Miles MacInnes	4,804	52.4	+2.9
Conservative	Richard Clayton	4,358	47.6	−2.9
Majority		446	4.8	N/A
Turnout		9,162	87.3	+5.9
Registered electors		10,494		
Liberal gain from Conservative		Swing	+2.9	

- Caused after the 1892 result was declared void on petition.

General election 1892: Hexham
Party	Candidate	Votes	%	±%
Conservative	*Nathaniel George Clayton	4,092	50.5	+7.0
Liberal	Miles MacInnes	4,010	49.5	−7.0
Majority		82	1.0	N/A
Turnout		8,102	81.4	+9.1
Registered electors		9,954		
Conservative gain from Liberal		Swing	+7.0	

- Clayton was unseated on petition

=== Elections in the 1880s ===
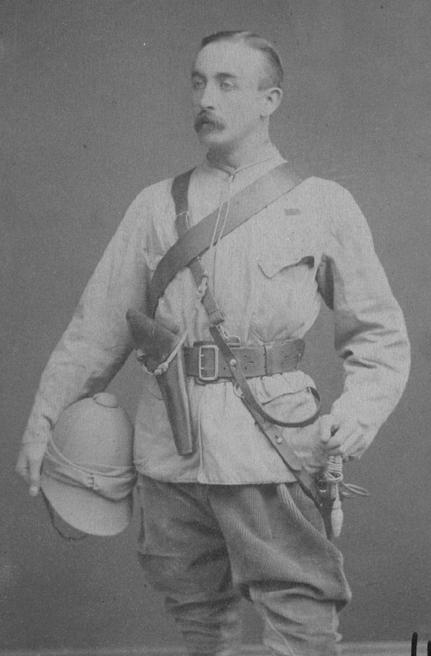
Melgund

General election 1886: Hexham
Party	Candidate	Votes	%	±%
Liberal	Miles MacInnes	4,177	56.5	−2.1
Conservative	Viscount Melgund	3,220	43.5	+2.1
Majority		957	13.0	−4.2
Turnout		7,397	72.3	−14.2
Registered electors		10,237		
Liberal hold		Swing	-2.1	

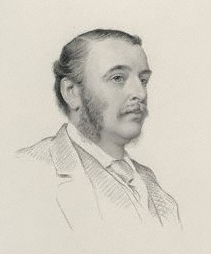
Ridley

General election 1885: Hexham
Party	Candidate	Votes	%	±%
Liberal	Miles MacInnes	5,193	58.6	
Conservative	Matthew Ridley	3,663	41.4	
Majority		1,530	17.2	
Turnout		8,856	86.5	
Registered electors		10,237		
Liberal win (new seat)				

== See also ==
- List of parliamentary constituencies in Northumberland
- History of parliamentary constituencies and boundaries in Northumberland
- List of parliamentary constituencies in North East England (region)

== Notes ==
Parliament of the United Kingdom
Preceded by Daventry	Constituency represented by the speaker 1943–1951	Succeeded by Cirencester and Tewkesbury
