= Richard Durning Holt =

British Liberal Party politician (1868–1941)

R. D. Holt

Sir Richard Durning Holt, Baronet, JP (13 November 1868 – 22 March 1941) was a British Liberal Party politician and businessman with interests in shipping.

== Background and education ==
Holt was born on 13 November 1868 at Edge Lane, in West Derby, Liverpool, Lancashire. He was one of five sons of Robert Durning Holt, a cotton broker and later Lord Mayor of Liverpool, by his wife Lawrencina Potter, daughter of Richard Potter and sister of Beatrice Webb. He was educated at Winchester and New College, Oxford.

== Political career ==
After some persuasion from Herbert Gladstone, Holt stood as Liberal candidate at Liverpool West Derby in 1903, when he lost to William Rutherford. He stood and lost again there in 1906. He was elected at a by-election in 1907 as a Liberal Member of Parliament (MP) for Hexham but his classical liberal ideas were increasingly out of fashion in the Liberal Party; he opposed David Lloyd George's social welfare legislation as government interference.

General election 1918: Eccles
Party		Candidate	Votes	%	±%
C	Unionist	Marshall Stevens	15,821	82.3	+34.7
	Liberal	Richard Durning Holt	3,408	17.7	−34.7
Majority			12,413	64.6	N/A
Turnout			19,229	55.4	−30.5
Registered electors			34,702		
	Unionist gain from Liberal		Swing	+34.7	
C indicates candidate endorsed by the coalition government.

However, he accepted the minimum wage in 1900 and a public works programme in 1929 after at first opposing it. He became part of the "Holt Cave" of Liberal MPs who opposed Lloyd George's 1914 budget. He was Liberal candidate for Cumberland North in 1929.

In January 1935 he was created a baronet for his services to shipping. In June 1936 he was elected to serve on the Liberal Party Council.

Holt had initially opposed Britain becoming involved in what became the First World War, writing on 2 August 1914 that he found it "impossible to believe that a Liberal Government can be guilty of the crime of dragging us into this conflict in which we are no way interested". However, by 9 August, he had changed his mind after Germany's attack on Belgium, whose neutrality both Germany and Britain had guaranteed. He later expressed dissatisfaction with voluntary fundraising in aid of the war effort, believing that it encouraged many people to become reliant on the work of others.

== Family ==
Holt was a lifelong Unitarian and was elected president of the British and Foreign Unitarian Association in 1918. He married Eliza Lawrence Wells in 1897. They had three daughters, of whom the eldest, Grace, married Anthony Methuen, 5th Baron Methuen. His daughter Anne stood as the Liberal Party candidate for Liverpool Toxteth at the 1950 General Election. Holt died in his house at 54 Ullet Road, Liverpool, on 22 March 1941, aged 72. There had been a male stillbirth in 1904 but no surviving sons, so the baronetcy died with him. His wife died in 1951.

Parliament of the United Kingdom
Preceded by Wenworth Beaumont	Member of Parliament for Hexham; 1907 – 1918	Succeeded by Douglas Clifton Brown
Baronetage of the United Kingdom
New creation	Baronet (of Liverpool); 1935–1941	Extinct
