= Wentworth Beaumont, 1st Viscount Allendale =

British politician

The Right Honourable The Viscount Allendale DL JP PC

Deputy Chief Whip of the House of Lords Captain of the Yeomen of the Guard
- In office 29 April 1907 – 2 October 1911
- Monarchs: Edward VII; George V
- Prime Minister: Sir Henry Campbell-Bannerman; H. H. Asquith
- Preceded by: The Earl Waldegrave
- Succeeded by: The Earl of Craven

Personal details
- Born: 2 December 1860 Bywell Hall, Northumberland
- Died: 12 December 1923 (aged 63) London, England
- Party: Liberal
- Spouse: Lady Alexandrina Louisa Maud Vane-Tempest
- Education: Trinity College, Cambridge

Arms of Beaumont, Viscount Allendale: Gules, a lion rampant or armed and langued azure an orle of eight crescents of the second

Wentworth Canning Blackett Beaumont, 1st Viscount Allendale PC, JP, DL (2 December 1860 – 12 December 1923), styled The Hon. Wentworth Beaumont between 1906 and 1907, and Lord Allendale from 1907, was a British Liberal politician.

== Background and education ==
Beaumont was born at Bywell Hall, Northumberland, the son of Wentworth Beaumont, 1st Baron Allendale, by his first wife Lady Margaret Anne de Burgh, daughter of Ulick de Burgh, 1st Marquess of Clanricarde, and his wife Harriet Canning, daughter of George Canning. He was baptised in London. He attended Eton and graduated from Trinity College, Cambridge with an MA in 1888.

== Political career ==
Beaumont was Member of Parliament for Hexham from 1895 to 1907 and served under Sir Henry Campbell-Bannerman as Vice-Chamberlain of the Household from 1905 to February 1907, when he succeeded his father in the barony of Allendale. He was appointed Captain of the Yeomen of the Guard in April 1907 and was sworn of the Privy Council the following month. On 5 July 1911 he was created Viscount Allendale, of Allendale and Hexham in the County of Northumberland, and from October of that year to 1916 he was a Lord-in-waiting under H. H. Asquith. Beaumont was also appointed a deputy lieutenant of Northumberland in September 1901.

== Family ==
Lord Allendale married Lady Alexandrina Vane-Tempest, daughter of George Vane-Tempest, 5th Marquess of Londonderry, on 12 November 1889. They had six children:

- Wentworth Henry Canning Beaumont, 2nd Viscount Allendale (6 August 1890 – 16 December 1956).
- Margaret Helen Beaumont (13 November 1892 – 10 June 1958), married the 5th Earl Fortescue and had issue.
- Aline Mary de Burgh Beaumont (23 April 1895 – 15 April 1967).
- Diane Beaumont (1896–31 January 1897).
- Ralph Edward Blackett Beaumont (12 February 1901 – 18 September 1977).
- Agatha Violet Beaumont (26 December 1903 – 15 January 1994).

Lord Allendale died in London in December 1923, aged 63, and was buried in the grounds of Bretton Hall, near Wakefield.

Parliament of the United Kingdom
Preceded by Miles MacInnes	Members of Parliament for Hexham; 1895–1907	Succeeded by Richard Durning Holt
Political offices
Preceded by Frederick Glyn	Vice-Chamberlain of the Household; 1905–1907	Succeeded by John Fuller
Preceded by The Earl Waldegrave	Captain of the Yeomen of the Guard; 1908–1911	Succeeded by The Earl of Craven
Preceded by The Lord Hamilton of Dalzell	Lord-in-waiting; 1911–1916	Succeeded by The Lord Kenyon
Peerage of the United Kingdom
New creation	Viscount Allendale; 1911–1923	Succeeded by Wentworth Henry Canning Beaumont
Preceded by Wentworth Blackett Beaumont	Baron Allendale; 1907–1923	Succeeded by Wentworth Henry Canning Beaumont
