= Rupert Speir =

British Conservative Party politician

Member of Parliament for Hexham
- In office 25 October 1951 – 10 March 1966
- Preceded by: Douglas Clifton Brown
- Succeeded by: Geoffrey Rippon

Personal details
- Born: 10 October 1910 East Saltoun, Scotland
- Died: October 16, 1998 (aged 88)
- Party: Conservative

Sir Rupert Malise Speir (10 September 1910 – 16 September 1998) was a British Conservative Party politician.

He was born at East Saltoun in East Lothian, Scotland, and educated at Eton College and at Pembroke College, Cambridge, where he was chairman of the Cambridge University Conservative Association. He became a solicitor, and in 1939 he joined the army, where he served in the Intelligence Corps throughout the Second World War.

At the 1945 general election, he stood unsuccessfully as the Conservative candidate in the safe Labour seat of Linlithgowshire in Scotland, winning 36% of the votes. He was unsuccessful again at the 1950 general election.

At the 1951 general election he was elected as Member of Parliament (MP) for Hexham, and held the seat until he retired at the 1966 general election.

Three private members bills sponsored by Speir were passed into law: the Litter Act 1958, the Noise Abatement Act 1960 and the Local Government (Financial Provisions) Act 1963.

Parliament of the United Kingdom
Preceded by Douglas Clifton Brown	Member of Parliament for Hexham; 1951–1966	Succeeded by Geoffrey Rippon
