= Geoffrey Rippon =

British politician (1924–1997)

The Right Honourable The Lord Rippon of Hexham PC QC
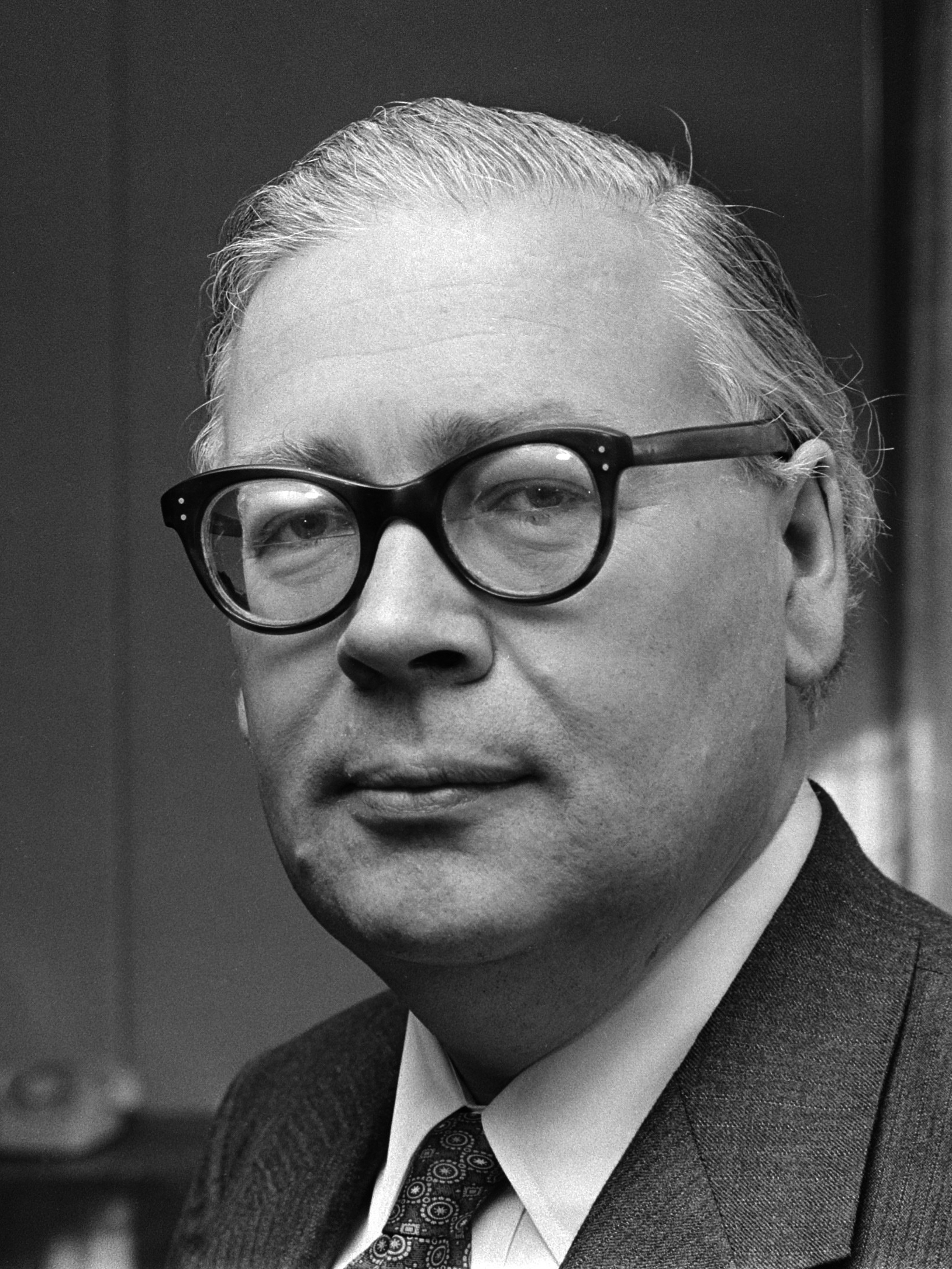
- Rippon in 1970

Leader of the Conservatives in the European Parliament
- In office 17 April 1977 – 7 July 1979
- Preceded by: Sir Peter Kirk
- Succeeded by: James Scott-Hopkins

Shadow Foreign Secretary
- In office August 1974 – 11 February 1975
- Leader: Edward Heath
- Preceded by: Alec Douglas-Home
- Succeeded by: Reginald Maudling

Secretary of State for the Environment
- In office 5 November 1972 – 4 March 1974
- Prime Minister: Edward Heath
- Preceded by: Peter Walker
- Succeeded by: Tony Crosland

Chancellor of the Duchy of Lancaster
- In office 25 July 1970 – 5 November 1972
- Prime Minister: Edward Heath
- Preceded by: Anthony Barber
- Succeeded by: John Davies

Minister of Technology
- In office 20 June 1970 – 25 July 1970
- Prime Minister: Edward Heath
- Preceded by: Tony Benn
- Succeeded by: John Davies

Shadow Secretary of State for Defence
- In office 14 November 1968 – 20 June 1970
- Leader: Edward Heath
- Preceded by: Reginald Maudling
- Succeeded by: George Thomson

Member of Parliament
- In office 31 March 1966 – 18 May 1987
- Preceded by: Rupert Speir
- Succeeded by: Alan Amos
- Constituency: Hexham
- In office 26 May 1955 – 25 September 1964
- Preceded by: Henry Strauss
- Succeeded by: Christopher Norwood
- Constituency: Norwich South

Personal details
- Born: 28 May 1924 Penn, Buckinghamshire, England
- Died: 28 January 1997 (aged 72) Broomfield, Somerset, England
- Party: Conservative
- Parent: Sydney Rippon (father)
- Education: King's College, Taunton
- Alma mater: Brasenose College, Oxford

Aubrey Geoffrey Frederick Rippon, Baron Rippon of Hexham, PC QC (28 May 1924 – 28 January 1997) was a British Conservative Party politician. He is most known for drafting the European Communities Act 1972 which took the United Kingdom into the European Communities on 1 January 1973. He was Chairman of the European-Atlantic Group.

== Early life ==
Born in Penn, Buckinghamshire, the son of the Somerset cricketer Sydney Rippon, Geoffrey Rippon was educated at King's College, Taunton, and Brasenose College, Oxford, where he was president of the University Conservative Association. He was called to the Bar in 1948 and was Mayor of Surbiton 1951–52 and a member of the London County Council from 1952, representing Chelsea. From 1958, he was the leader of the Conservative Party group on the council.

== Parliamentary career ==
After unsuccessfully contesting the seat of Shoreditch and Finsbury in both 1950 and 1951, he became MP for Norwich South in 1955.

As Minister for Public Building and Works in 1962, Rippon controversially sought to demolish and redevelop the Italianate Foreign and Commonwealth Office main building designed in the 1860s by Sir George Gilbert Scott. After a campaign led by The Victorian Society and a public outcry the decision was overturned and the building was subsequently granted Grade I listed building status.

In 1964 Rippon was defeated, but moved to the constituency of Hexham in Northumberland at the 1966 general election and remained MP there until retiring in 1987. Among his posts in the Shadow Cabinet was that of Shadow Defence Secretary from 1969 to 1970.

In 1970 he became Chancellor of the Duchy of Lancaster under Edward Heath, and being in favour of the Common Market was given the responsibility of negotiating Britain's entry into it. In 1972 he moved to become Secretary of State for the Environment. During his tenure the Department of the Environment was housed on Marsham Street in unattractive tower blocks nicknamed 'the three ugly sisters'. Rippon is supposed to have commented to his civil servants that the view from the top floor was the best in London, as one could not see the towers themselves.

While Secretary of State for the Environment he introduced the Water Act 1973, which amalgamated over 1500 separate private, and local authority water provision, sewage, water treatment, and regulatory entities into 10 Regional Water Authorities, organised on a natural Hydrological basis.

He was at one time a prominent member of the Conservative Monday Club, for whom he authored a booklet entitled Right Angle, and was guest-of-honour at their Annual Dinner in 1970. The club was, however, divided on the EEC (European Community) issue, and at their conference in October 1971 members moved and carried a resolution opposing Britain's entry.

From 1979 to 1982, Rippon was President of the European Documentation and Information Centre (CEDI).

He was created a life peer on 5 October 1987 taking the title Baron Rippon of Hexham, of Hesleyside in the County of Northumberland.

== Arms ==
Coat of arms of Geoffrey Rippon
Crest A Stag's Head erased and per fess wavy Gules and Argent in the argent two bars wavy Azure attired Gules each attire charged with two Bars Gold Escutcheon Barry wavy of fourteen Argent and Azure a Cross Patonce between in dexter chief and in sinister base a Hunting Horn stringed Sable Supporters Dexter: on a Mount of Rocky Moorland proper a Bull guardant Gules unguled Or gorged with an Ancient Crown also Or the Horns Gules each charged with two Bars Gold; Sinister: on a like Mount proper a Stag guardant Gules unguled Or gorged with an Ancient Crown also Or attired Gules each attire charged with two Bars Gold Motto Frangas Non Flecta

Parliament of the United Kingdom
Preceded by Henry Strauss	Member of Parliament for Norwich South; 1955–1964	Succeeded by Christopher Norwood
Preceded by Rupert Speir	Member of Parliament for Hexham; 1966–1987	Succeeded by Alan Amos
Political offices
Preceded by Reginald Maudling	Shadow Secretary of State for Defence; 1969–1970	Succeeded by George Thomson
Preceded by Anthony Barber	Chancellor of the Duchy of Lancaster; 1970–1972	Succeeded by John Davies
Preceded by Peter Walker	Secretary of State for the Environment; 1972–1974	Succeeded by Tony Crosland
Preceded by James Callaghan	Shadow Foreign Secretary; 1974–1975	Succeeded by Reginald Maudling
Party political offices
Preceded by Norris Kenyon	Leader of the Conservative Party on the London County Council; 1958–1961	Succeeded by Percy Rugg
Preceded by Sir Peter Kirk	Leader of the Conservatives in the European Parliament; 1977–1979	Succeeded by James Scott-Hopkins
