= Richard Clayton (clergyman) =

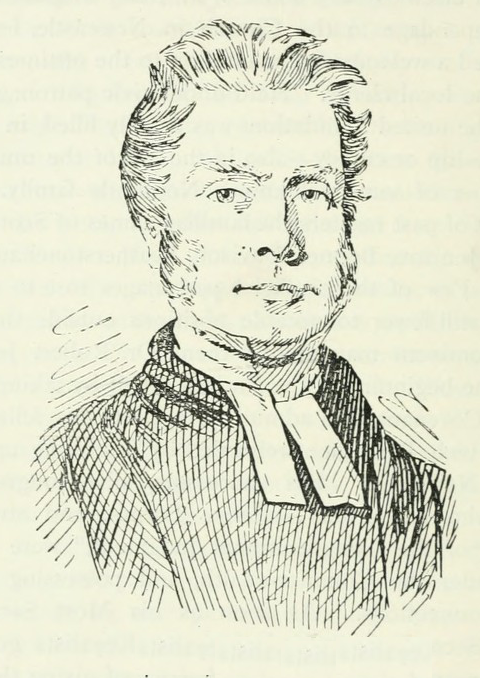
Richard Clayton

Richard Clayton (9 March 1802 – 8 October 1856) was a British clergyman, Master of the Mary Magdalene Hospital and chaplain to the Church of St Thomas the Martyr, Newcastle upon Tyne from 1826 until his death.

== Early life ==
Richard Clayton was born 9 March 1802 in Newcastle. He was a son of Dorothy (née Atkinson) and Nathaniel Clayton, a wealthy solicitor, owner of the Chesters estate and Town Clerk of Newcastle upon Tyne from 1785 to 1822. His maternal grandmother was Bridget Atkinson. He was educated at Percy Street Academy in Newcastle, then at Harrow School. He matriculated at University College, Oxford in 1820, graduating B.A. in 1823 and M.A. in 1826.

Clayton, aged 24, was in 1826 appointed Master of the Mary Magdalene Hospital — a Newcastle charity — and chaplain to the Church of St Thomas the Martyr, a position linked to the charity. The linked position was in the gift of the Newcastle city authorities, and was generally given to members of well-known Newcastle families; Clayton's brother John held the Town Clerk position after his father's retirement.

== Evangelical views ==
According to Richard Welford's biography of Clayton, he had distinguished himself in theology whilst at Oxford, formed decided views, acquired fixed principles, and become serious and thoughtful beyond his years. In Newcastle, Clayton encountered Robert Wasney (1772/3–1836), a product of Yorkshire evangelical clerical societies that worked to provide graduate priests. Wasney was a pupil of Milner at Hull Grammar School, and went on to Clare College, Cambridge in 1791, associating with followers of Charles Simeon, and graduating B.A. in 1795. He was ordained priest in 1796, to Waghen, but soon went as curate to James Stillingfleet at Hotham. He then moved to St Thomas's Chapel, Newcastle, in 1808.

Clayton was influenced by Wasney, and adopted Simeonite evangelical views. Up to Wasney's death in 1836, Clayton acted as Wasney's assistant.

== Religious leader ==
Assisted by the influence of his brother John, Clayton entered a scheme for the reconstruction of the St Thomas chapel, and in May, 1828, the erection of St. Thomas's Church, Barras Bridge, to a design of John Dobson, was formally begun; in October 1829 John Clayton laid the corner-stone, and a year later the edifice was consecrated and opened for public worship.

According to Welford, Clayton was fluent in speech and impressive in manner, and his preaching of attracted a large congregation of intelligent and well-to-do citizens. Amiable and tolerant towards conscientious Nonconformity, he was by common consent placed at the head of religious and philanthropic movements in which Churchmen and Dissenters in the town were able to co-operate. Having no parochial duties to engross his time, he was able to give attention and aid to unsectarian co-workers in the management of the Town Mission, Bible Society, Reformatory School, Asylum for the Blind, and kindred institutions, as well as to promote the cause of voluntary education. Thus there gradually grew up around him a large body of friends, both within and without the Church, who followed his lead in schemes of local benevolence, and strengthened his hands in the perils of ecclesiastical controversy.

Of this latter element, engendered by the Tractarian movement, there was in Newcastle, as elsewhere, no lack. Clayton's natural disposition was averse to theological disputation; but the clear and decided views which he held upon Church questions were firmly maintained and piously exemplified. Staunch and true to the old order of public worship, he set his face rigidly against "Puseyite innovations" A plain but hearty service, accompanied by congregational singing, and followed by fervent preaching, were the characteristics of Divine worship at St. Thomas's, and those who wanted "millinery and mummery", "posturing and Popery" by which alliterative designations the practices of high churchmen were derided, might go elsewhere.

In a little book about Jesmond Church, Councillor Cutter of Newcastle, notes that

"Mr. Clayton was the leader of the Evangelical party in the Church in this town, and the staunch supporter of the Church Missionary Society, the Jews' Society, and all kindred societies having for their object the diffusion of Evangelical principles. He was likewise a great supporter of our Town Mission, and regularly took the chair at the annual meetings. He was a sound Churchman, and, as the great festivals of the Church came round, there was always a special sermon suitable for the occasion; but all ritualism and high-churchism he had an utter contempt for. No clergyman professing Tractarian principles was ever invited to preach at St. Thomas's. When a stranger came to ofificiate, and asked, 'Have you any chanting?' his usual reply was, 'No, we don't like boys to sing it out for us here; we like to say it ourselves.'"

== Death ==
Clayton's career terminated while he was still young: he died, after a short illness, in October 1856, at the age of 54. His funeral sermon was preached by the Rev. George Townshend Fox.

== Aftermath ==
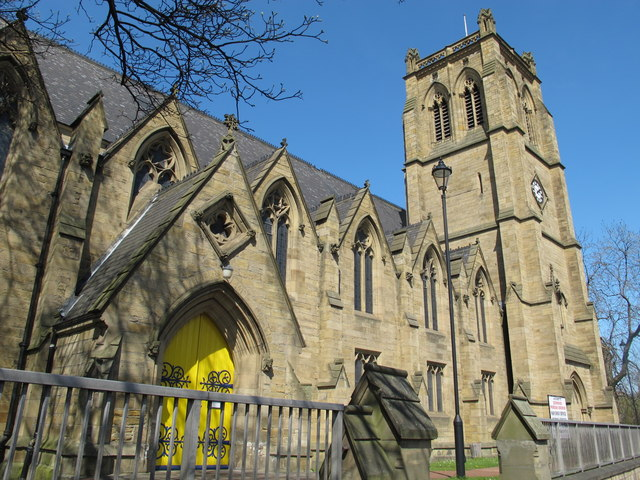
Jesmond Parish Church, 2013 photograph

The majority of Clayton's congregation were driven from St. Thomas's by the appointment of a high church Master, Clement Moody. They erected a new church building in Jesmond Road, originally called "The Clayton Memorial" and now known as Jesmond Parish Church. Over the church's vestry door is the inscription: "This church, consecrated to the Glory of God, 14th January, 1861, was erected to the memory of the Rev. Richard Clayton, M.A., who was for 30 years Master of the Hospital of St. Mary Magdalene, and the faithful minister of St. Thomas's Church, Newcastle-upon-Tyne. He died 8th October, 1856, aged 54 years."

His son Nathaniel Clayton was elected Conservative MP for Hexham in 1892.

== Works ==
Two at least of Clayton's sermons were published. One of them preached at St. Thomas's, 27 June 1841, is entitled, Dissuasives from Frequenting the Race Course; the other, delivered in the same place on 8 September 1842, was Oratorios Unsuited to the House of Prayer, and Inconsistent with a Christian Profession.
