= Joe Morris (politician) =

British politician

Joe Morris MP
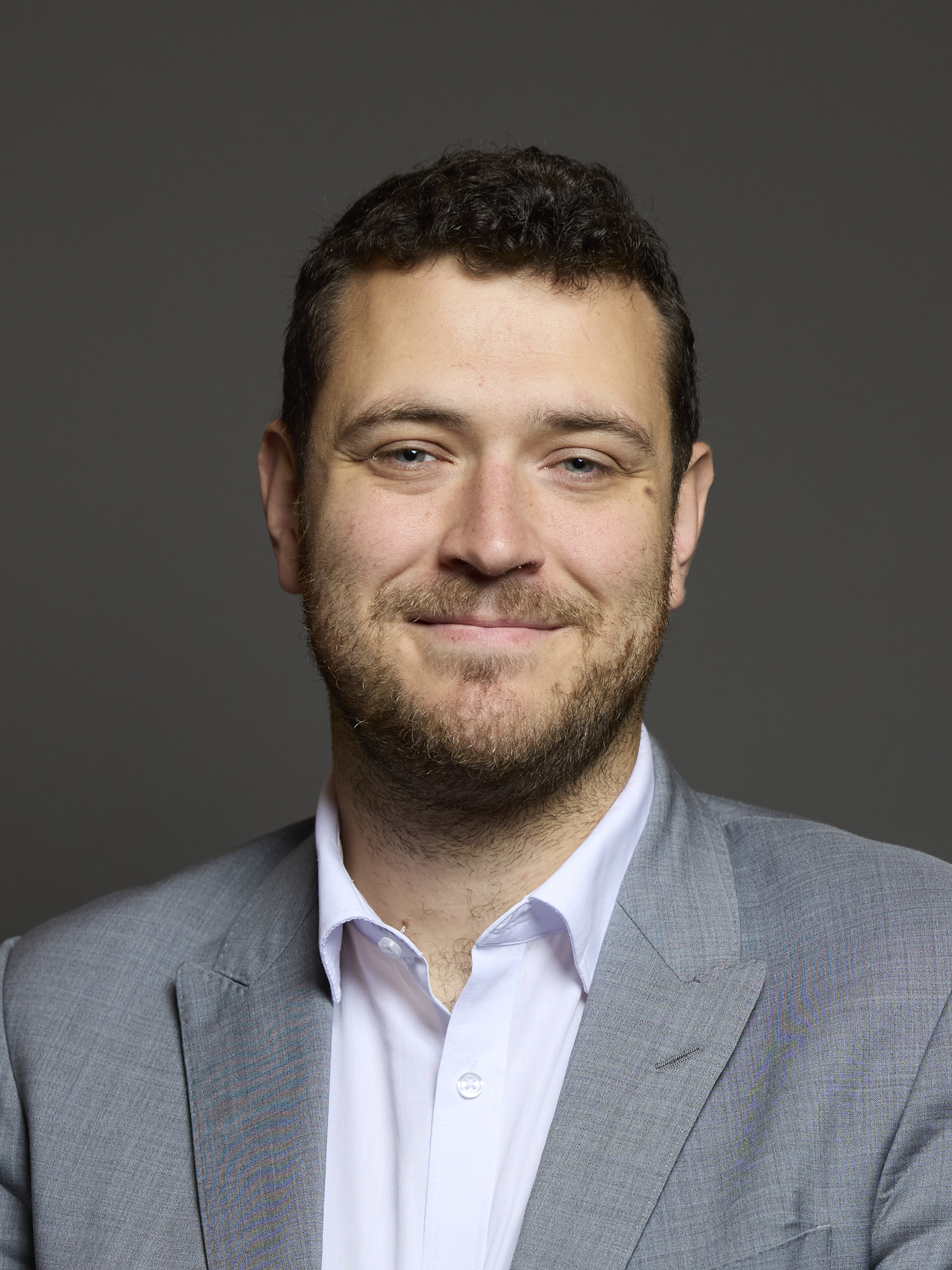
- Official portrait, 2024

Member of Parliament for Hexham
- Incumbent
- Assumed office 4 July 2024
- Preceded by: Guy Opperman
- Majority: 3,713 (7.2%)

Personal details
- Party: Labour
- Spouse: Hana Al-Izzi (m. 2025)
- Education: Queen Elizabeth High School, Hexham; Mansfield College, Oxford (BA)

Joseph Ronald Morris is a British Labour Party politician serving as the Member of Parliament for Hexham since 2024.

== Political career ==
He is the first Labour MP for Hexham, breaking a 100-year streak of Conservative MPs.

According to his LinkedIn profile, prior to his election Morris worked as a parliamentary assistant for Labour MPs Kate Hollern, Rupa Huq and Bill Esterson. He has also worked for Make UK and as an Associate Director at Hanbury Strategy, a public affairs and communications agency.

In February 2025, Morris was named a parliamentary private secretary in the Department of Health and Social Care. He chairs the Labour group of rural MPs.

On 11 May 2026, Morris resigned as Parliamentary private secretary to Secretary of State for Health and Social Care Wes Streeting, and called on the Prime Minister to resign.

== Personal life ==
Morris married Hana Al-Izzi, an adviser to Labour party chair Anna Turley, on New Year’s Eve 2025.

== Electoral performance ==
=== House of Commons ===
General election 2024: Hexham
Party	Candidate	Votes	%	±%
Labour	Joe Morris	23,988	46.3	+14.5
Conservative	Guy Opperman	20,275	39.1	−15.2
Green	Nick Morphet	2,467	4.8	+1.1
Liberal Democrats	Nick Cott	2,376	4.6	−4.8
Independent	Chris Whaley	1,511	2.9	New
SDP	William Clouston	1,211	2.3	New
Majority		3,713	7.2	N/A
Turnout		51,828	68.0	−6.4
Labour gain from Conservative		Swing	+14.9	
