= Dudley Rippon =

English cricketer

Personal information
- Full name: Albert Dudley Eric Rippon
- Born: 29 April 1892; Kensington, London, England
- Died: 16 April 1963 (aged 70); Cholsey, Berkshire, England
- Batting: Right-handed
- Bowling: Right-arm medium
- Role: Opening batsman
- Relatives: Sydney Rippon (brother)

Domestic team information
- Years: Team
- 1914–1920: Somerset
- FC debut: 9 May 1914 Somerset v Surrey
- Last FC: 18 May 1920 Somerset v Sussex

Career statistics
Competition	First-class
Matches	31
Runs scored	1,043
Batting average	20.05
100s/50s	2/3
Top score	134
Balls bowled	2,042
Wickets	37
Bowling average	30.00
5 wickets in innings	1
10 wickets in match	0
Best bowling	5/107
Catches/stumpings	30/–
- Source: CricketArchive, 12 October 2009

Albert Dudley Eric Rippon (29 April 1892 – 16 April 1963) played 31 first-class cricket matches for Somerset, all but one of them in the 1914 and 1919 seasons on either side of the First World War. In many of his first-class matches, he opened the batting with his identical twin brother, Sydney Rippon.

The Rippon family hailed from London but had relocated to Radstock in Somerset, and the twins were sent to school at King's College, Taunton, where they made a lot of runs and caused confusion by their close resemblance to each other. Sydney joined the Knowle Cricket Club in Bristol and scored heavily in club cricket; Dudley got a job on a Bath newspaper and played for a local team.

Dudley Rippon was a right-handed batsman and a right-arm medium pace bowler. He played regularly for Somerset in the 1914 season and was joined in his third match by his brother, with whom he opened the innings. In his fourth match, against Sussex, he carried his bat for an unbeaten 105 (though Somerset had two players injured and unable to bat in this innings). Rippon himself was also injured in this match and had to use a runner. Later in the same season, in the match against Yorkshire at Bramall Lane, Sheffield, he took five Yorkshire wickets in an innings for 107 runs, the only time he returned a five-wicket-innings analysis; Somerset lost the match by an innings inside two days, but Rippon also top-scored in each Somerset innings.

Following Britain's entry into the First World War on 4 August 1914, Rippon was commissioned into the horse transport section of the Army Service Corps as a second lieutenant. He was badly wounded during the Gallipoli Campaign, which he had joined on 5 November 1915. As a result of his wounds he was discharged with the Silver War Badge and the honorary rank of lieutenant. On 10 October 1918 he managed to obtain a new commission as a second lieutenant in the Administrative Branch of the fledgling Royal Air Force and was based in Edmonton, London. Despite his wartime injuries, he appeared fairly regularly for Somerset again in 1919. Against Essex at Leyton, he and Sydney put on 144 for the first Somerset wicket, and Dudley went on to score 134, his highest first-class score. But after this season, he made just one further first-class appearance, in the 1920 season, his wounds finally taking their toll. His brother continued to play occasional matches for Somerset through to 1937. After his retirement from first-class cricket, Rippon became cricket correspondent for the Illustrated Sporting and Dramatic News and Daily Chronicle.
