= Sydney Rippon =

English cricketer

Personal information
- Full name: Arthur Ernest Sydney Rippon
- Born: 29 April 1892; Kensington, London, England
- Died: 13 April 1966 (aged 73); Berrylands, Surbiton, Surrey, England
- Batting: Right-handed
- Bowling: Right-arm slow
- Role: Opening batsman
- Relatives: Dudley Rippon (brother); Geoffrey Rippon (son)

Domestic team information
- Years: Team
- 1914–1937: Somerset
- FC debut: 21 May 1914 Somerset v Surrey
- Last FC: 9 July 1937 Somerset v Nottinghamshire

Career statistics
Competition	First-class
Matches	104
Runs scored	3,823
Batting average	21.59
100s/50s	6/15
Top score	133
Balls bowled	192
Wickets	3
Bowling average	40.33
5 wickets in innings	0
10 wickets in match	0
Best bowling	1/6
Catches/stumpings	44/–
- Source: CricketArchive, 12 October 2009

Arthur Ernest Sydney Rippon (29 April 1892 – 13 April 1966) was an English cricketer who played 102 first-class cricket matches for Somerset as a batsman between 1914 and 1937. In many of his early first-class matches in 1914 and 1919, he opened the batting with his identical twin brother, Dudley Rippon.

== Background ==
The Rippon family hailed from London but had relocated to Radstock in Somerset, and the twins were sent to school at King's College, Taunton, where they made a lot of runs and caused confusion by their close resemblance to each other. Sydney joined the Knowle Cricket Club in Bristol and scored heavily in club cricket; Dudley got a job on a Bath newspaper and played for a local team.

== Cricket career ==
Like his brother, Sydney Rippon was a right-handed opening batsman; unlike Dudley, he was not a regular bowler in first-class cricket, and he took only three first-class wickets in his career. He made his debut a few days after his brother, and played only six matches in the 1914 season, with a top score of 60 in the final one of those, against Gloucestershire at Taunton.

Rippon also played in the return match at Bristol: that match began on 3 August 1914, and the following day the United Kingdom declared war on Germany as the First World War broke out across Europe. Rippon was commissioned as a second lieutenant in the Royal Fusiliers, initially in its third (reserve) battalion. In 1916, he was transferred to one of the new service battalions being formed as part of "Kitchener's Army". He entered the Western Front in France on 14 May 1916. He was promoted to lieutenant on 1 July 1917. He was later wounded, and as a result, resigned his commission on 24 January 1918, he was issued with the Silver War Badge to show that he had been honourably discharged. After this he joined the Inland Revenue, and was appointed an Inspector of Taxes on 11 November 1921.

Despite his wartime injuries, Rippon returned to first-class cricket in 1919. He played fairly regularly in that season and the next two, and then made a minimum of six and a maximum of 10 appearances for Somerset each season through to 1929 – except for the 1926 season, when he played just once. After 1929, he was out of cricket for eight years, but reappeared in six matches in 1937. In 1927, he played one first-class match for the Civil Service against the New Zealanders and in 1928 he played in one rain-ruined Gentlemen v Players match at The Oval.

In the 1919 season, he made his then highest score, 92, in the match against Gloucestershire at Taunton while batting under an alias: Rippon was working for the Inland Revenue and had not been given permission to play in the match. So he batted as "S. Trimnell", using his grandmother's name. By the time the 1920 edition of Wisden was published, the story had come out and the innings is recorded under Rippon's real name: "A. E. S. Rippon, who played under an assumed name, enjoyed by far his biggest success during the season," Wisden wrote.

In six out of the ten seasons between 1920 and 1929, he made centuries, but never more than one in any season, and his total of runs in a season never exceeded 600. Among his centuries was one of 118, made in Somerset's first-ever first-class match against Glamorgan in 1921. He put on 189 for the first wicket with the dashing Peter Randall Johnson, who made 123 of the runs; Rippon was, by implication in Wisden's report, much slower, though his runs came in 190 minutes. His highest innings was 133 against Worcestershire at the Knowle ground in 1927, the runs being made out of 314 runs while he was at the wicket: he "wore down the attack", wrote Wisden, and "showed such patience in waiting for the right ball to hit that he did not give a chance". Not all of his batting was slow, however: in 1928, the last of his centuries was 112 against Hampshire and he put on 197 for the first wicket with Tom Young, the runs coming in less than 150 minutes.

Rippon's return to the Somerset side after an absence of eight years in 1937 was less successful, and his top score in 12 innings was just 28.

== Personal life ==
Sydney Rippon was the father of the UK Conservative Party politician Geoffrey Rippon, who was a minister in the government of Edward Heath.
