= Nathaniel Clayton =

19th-century British politician

Member of Parliament for Hexham
- In office 4 July 1892 – 1892
- Preceded by: Miles MacInnes
- Succeeded by: Miles MacInnes

Personal details
- Born: 20 September 1833
- Died: 5 September 1895 (aged 61)
- Party: Conservative
- Parent: Richard Clayton (father)

Nathaniel George Clayton (20 September 1833 – 5 September 1895) was a British Conservative politician who served as Member of Parliament (MP) for Hexham in 1892.

Clayton was the son of Mary Clayton and Richard Clayton, Master of the Mary Magdalene Hospital and chaplain to the Church of St Thomas the Martyr, Newcastle upon Tyne.

Clayton was first elected at the 1892 general election, and left parliament later that year after an election petition.
