= Haltwhistle Castle =

Coordinates: 54.9706°N 2.4515°W

Haltwhistle Castle Hill is a ruined Norman earth and timber ringwork fortress in Haltwhistle, Northumberland, England. There are no extant stone remains.
