= Westminster bubble =

British political term

The Westminster bubble (also called the Westminster village) is a characterisation including members of the Parliament of the United Kingdom as being isolated from life outside Parliament. As well as referring to members of Parliament and peers, the characterisation also extends to people such as lobbyists, researchers, secretaries, civil servants, lobby correspondents and leader writers for newspapers and is so named because Parliament is located in the City of Westminster.

Politicians in this bubble often graduate from prestigious private schools and elite Russell Group Universities to then climb the political ladder to become MPs, always remaining in the professional bubble of Westminster, creating a certain set of life experiences in which of often argued to be displayed in many of the MPs in London.

Furthermore, the Westminster bubble can also be viewed as a centralisation of political issues geographically around Westminster and Parliament, where in which London based and diplomatic issues gain more attention than more regional issues in other areas of the United Kingdom, particularly Scotland, Wales, and Northern Ireland. These regions have been argued to have been, in some cases, "left behind" in the decision-making processes in Westminster due to a centralisation of focus on issues specific to the capital of London and England, especially in regard to Brexit. Notably, both Scotland and Northern Ireland voted to remain in the European Union, but have been forced to undertake the verdict of the Westminster government.

A similar situation occurs in the United States, where the governmental culture in and around Washington, D.C. is sometimes known as the "Washington bubble" or more often "inside the Beltway". More recently, in Scotland, there has been a development of a Holyrood bubble, as the Scottish Parliament is in the Holyrood district of Edinburgh.

An example of the characterisation includes Peter Hain speaking in the House on 29 January 2004:

"All broadcasters, the whole coverage of politics, the Westminster bubble that we as politicians of the Government and Opposition occupy together with the Westminster lobby; together we are all conducting politics in a way that is turning off voters, listeners, readers and watchers by the million."

In July 2003, Hain had described it in a newspaper article as:

"That politically incestuous world occupied by politicians, government and opposition, together with the media. Politicians, news broadcasters and journalists now form a 'political class' which is in a frenzied world of its own, divorced from the people, and which is turning off viewers, listeners and readers from politics by the million.".

In November 2003 Conservative Party leader Michael Howard indicated on the day of his appointment that he wished to be a "leader outside the Westminster Bubble."

Sometimes, some politicians recently have claimed some issues to be "Westminster bubble" issues, arguing that they are issues that have not gained, or are not gaining, traction with the general public and cutting through.

== See also ==
- Communal reinforcement
