= Church of St Thomas the Martyr, Newcastle =

Church in Newcastle upon Tyne, England

Coordinates: 54°58′42″N 01°36′45″W

St Thomas the Martyr, Newcastle upon Tyne
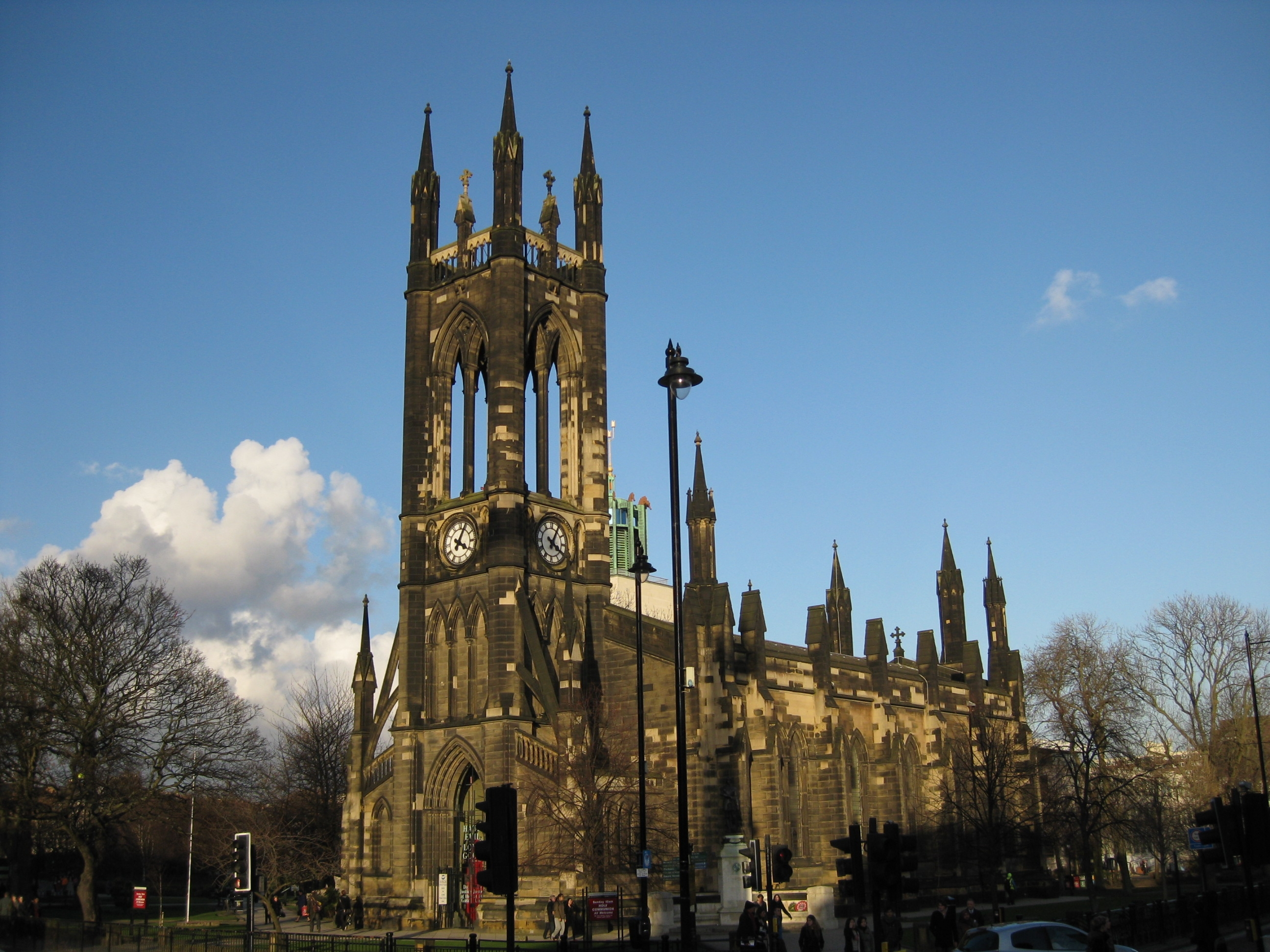
- St Thomas the Martyr Church
- St Thomas the Martyr, Newcastle upon Tyne
- Denomination: Church of England
- Churchmanship: Evangelical
- Website: www.stthomas.church

History
- Dedication: St Thomas the Martyr

Administration
- Province: York
- Diocese: Newcastle
- Archdeaconry: Northumberland
- Deanery: Newcastle Central Deanery
- Parish: none (see Legal Status)

The Church of St Thomas the Martyr (known as St Thomas' Newcastle) in Newcastle upon Tyne, Tyne and Wear, England. It is a prominent city centre landmark, located close to both universities, the city hall and main shopping district in the Haymarket.

It is a 19th-century Anglican re-foundation of a medieval chapel, traditionally said to have been created by one of the assassins of Thomas Becket. Revitalised and appointed as Resource Church for the Diocese of Newcastle in 2019, with a new minister and staff team, it has now become a popular church for students and young adults.

== History ==
=== Dedication and foundation ===
The church is dedicated to St Thomas Becket, Archbishop of Canterbury, who was murdered in 1170 by a group of four English knights acting – so they mistakenly believed – on the orders of Henry II. Since Becket had defended the privileges of the Church against Henry, he was regarded as a martyr and canonized in 1173. The four murderers were instructed, in order to atone for their sins, to serve a period as confreres (associate brothers) of the Knights Templar, but it is believed that one of them, Hugh de Morville, also elected to found a chapel dedicated to the saint as a private penance. It was this chapel which would eventually become the Church of St Thomas the Martyr. The precise foundation date is uncertain, but probably in the 1170s, and certainly by the early 13th century.

=== De Morville’s chapel ===
De Morville – if indeed he was responsible (there is no absolute proof) – set up his chapel at a riverside location, next to what is now the Swing Bridge but what was then a wooden affair and the only bridge across the Tyne at Newcastle. By 1248 both bridge and chapel were in the care of a Keeper, known only as Lawrence. In that year much of the town was destroyed by fire; the chapel escaped, but the bridge was badly damaged and Lawrence was given responsibility for raising money for rebuilding, which included the reconstruction of the bridge in stone.

In 1329 one William Heron founded a Chantry within St Thomas’, dedicated to St Anne and endowed with £4 17s per annum; a second Chantry, dedicated to St Mary, had £4 3s 6d a year. In 1339 the chapel bridge was once more severely damaged, this time by flood, and it remained ruinous for much of the 14th century.

The chapel possessed three cellars, one of which was rented out by William Spyn, the then chaplain, at 14 shillings a year in 1347. Further income was raised through a windmill below Jesmond (confirmed as the chapel's property in 1408) and more land, in Whickham, left to the chapel in the will of Roger Thornton in 1429.

=== St Mary Magdalene’s Hospital and the move to the new site ===
The Hospital of St Mary Magdalene was founded just outside Newcastle by Henry I to cater for those afflicted with leprosy, a disease brought to the Country by returning Crusaders. The hospital was located near what is now the northern end of Northumberland Street. Although a religious house, the hospital was overlooked in the Dissolution of the Monasteries in the 16th century English Reformation, and the Hospital continues to operate into the present day, though evolving into a charity rather than a working hospital by the early 19th century. James I incorporated the hospital and the Chapel of St Thomas the Martyr into a single institution under the government of a Master, the first of these being a Mr Jennison.

In 1732 the Mayor and Corporation of Newcastle, who acted as patrons of the united hospital and chapel and who were empowered to alter the statutes, beautified the chapel and made it a Chapel of ease for St Nicholas Church. At that time it seated 300 people.

Alterations were made to the chapel in 1770 and subsequently, but it was damaged in a great flood in 1771. Although the building was not substantially affected, by 1827 it was felt the old chapel needed replacing and it was closed in March that year, with a replacement built on the site of St Mary Magdalene's Hospital.

=== 1830 new church ===
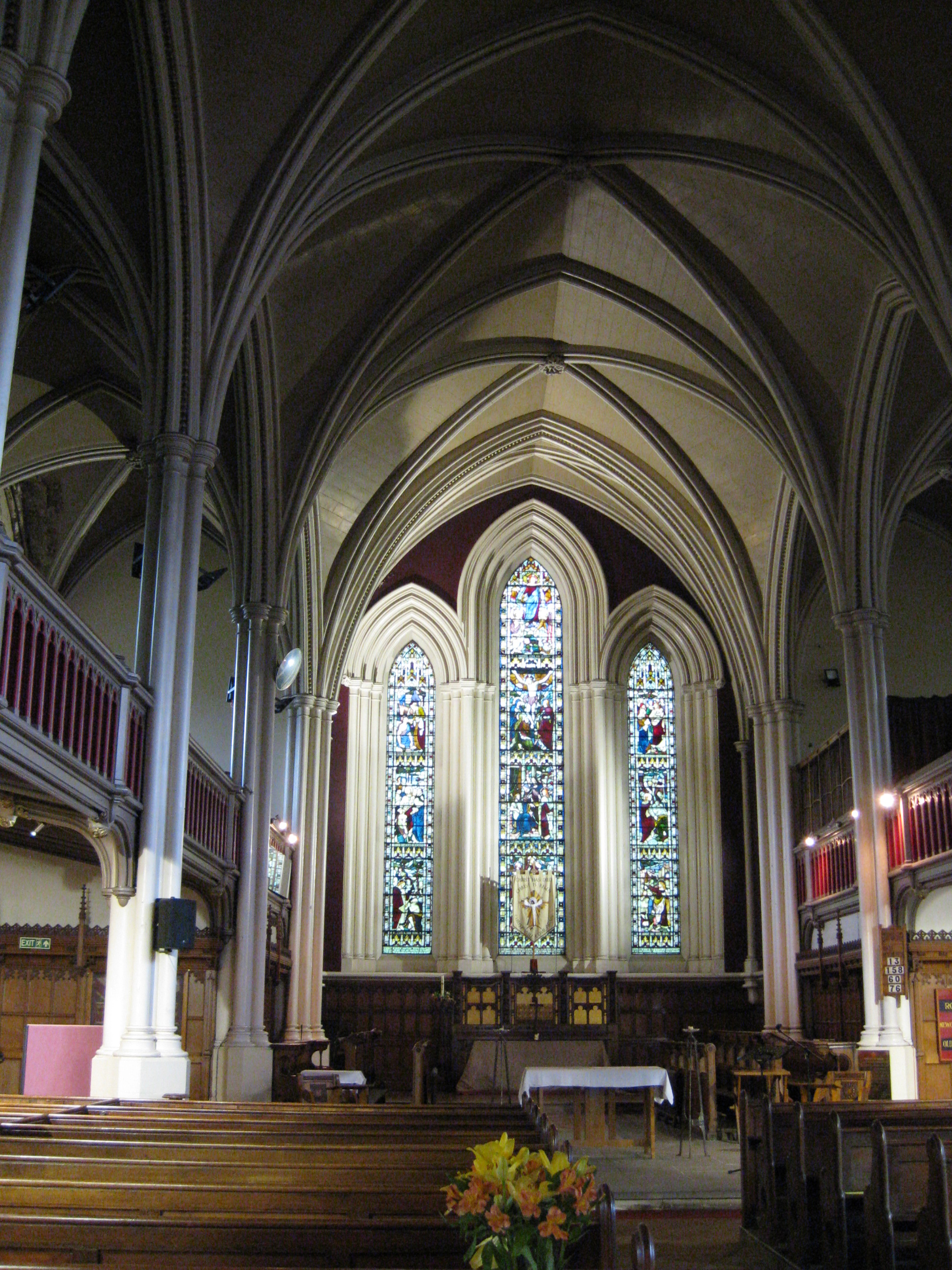
Interior looking towards the altar, prior to the removal of pews and addition of glass partitions

The Newcastle architect John Dobson was hired to design the new church, and he produced an elegant Gothic-style building at a cost of £6000. The present church was built by John Dobson, between 1827 and 1830. Galleries were added in 1837 and the seating was replaced in 1881. In 1972 the level of the High Altar was lowered, the chancel screen removed and the chancel extended into the nave, with a nave altar. The present church is a Grade II* Listed Building.

=== Exodus to Jesmond ===
1856 saw the untimely death of Rev Richard Clayton, Master of St Thomas's, and a local evangelical light. In his place the city authorities decided to appoint Clement Moody, vicar of Newcastle and a high churchman opposed to evangelicalism. A large number of the congregation of St Thomas's were deeply unhappy. A committee was formed with the intention of planting a new church nearby, which "will form a central point for the maintenance and promulgation of sound scriptural and evangelical truth in a large and populous town." A new church building, Jesmond Parish Church, was designed by the architect John Dobson and consecrated by 1861.

== The modern church ==
=== Legal status ===
The modern St Thomas the Martyr has no parish, but neither is it a peculiar (ecclesiastical enclave), making it unique in the Church of England. It is governed by the body corporate (comprising the senior priest and churchwardens) and ultimately through acts of Parliament. It lies within the Diocese of Newcastle, the Archdeaconry of Northumberland and the Deanery of Newcastle. It was formally separated from the Hospital of St Mary Magdalene in 1978, but the senior priest of the church is still referred to as the Master.

=== Services and civic function ===
Despite having no parish, the church maintains a normal routine of regular weekly services. Currently, these consist of 10.30am Communion service (Eucharist) and a 6.30pm communion service on Sundays and a service of Holy Communion at 12.30pm on Wednesdays.

However, the church is regarded as serving the whole city, the universities and various organisations and communities. Consequently, it serves as the venue for a busy programme of civic and private services. Its proximity to the City Hall and to both Newcastle and Northumbria Universities mean it acts as semi-official church to these institutions, but it also provides regular services for the Royal British Legion, various Regimental Associations and the Mothers’ Union, amongst other groups. In recent years, conductor and organist Miles Cragg has presided at the organ for a number of carol services. A choir comprising members of King's College, later Newcastle University, always sang at the University Carol Service in December and occasionally for funerals of members of staff of the University.

St Thomas' launched in October 2019 as the Resource Church for the Diocese of Newcastle. A new staff team were employed and a team from St Michael le Belfrey in York was sent to relaunch the church. The congregation very quickly grew and the church now attracts large numbers of young people each week.

=== Ethos ===
St Thomas's has a reputation for involvement in social issues, most notably trade justice, developing countries' debt and related subjects. This has been expressed through major campaigns, such as involvement in the Jubilee 2000 and Make Poverty History movements, and also on a smaller scale, such as support for Fair Trade and sale of fairly traded goods in the church's One World Shop. In addition a variety of national, international and local charitable causes are supported through a range of methods.

=== 2019 building project ===
Starting in 2019, plans were drawn up for a major renovation and reordering of the Church building, and was completed in 2022. As part of the work, the floors were removed and rebuilt, new partitions were inserted in order to create meeting rooms and other spaces in the former aisles of the church, and the 19th century bench seating was removed and replaced with standard stackable chairs. The galleries of 1837 have been enclosed in glass, and the raked seating has been floored over in order to create additional rooms. A full-immersion font was installed in the nave of the church.

== List of Masters ==
- Laurence, in 1269.
- William of Stanhope occurs in 1289 and 1297.
- Nicholas de Stockton occurs in 1341.
- William Spynn was master and keeper of Tyne Bridge in 1347 and 1352.
- John Wernmouth occurs in 1411 and 1413.
- John Crofte appointed by the corporation in 1426.
- Thomas Scott occurs in 1498.
- John Brandlyng, clerk, appointed 30 August 1538.
- Cuthbert Ellison held this office before 13 March 1556.
- Sir George Carr, priest, appointed 24 July 1565.
- Robert Jennison 1611 - 1652
- Cuthbert Sydenham 1652 - 1653
- Samuel Hammond 1653 - ????
- Robert Bonner 1662 - 1676
- Thomas Davison 1676 - 1716
- John Chilton 1716 - 1717
- Robert Thomlinson 1717 - 1748
- Henry Featherstonehalgh 1748 - 1779
- Nathanael Clayton 1779 - 1786
- Henry Ridley 1786 - 1825
- John Smith 1825 - 1826
- Richard Clayton 1826 - 1856
- Clement Moody 1856 - 1871
- Marsden Gibson 1872 - 1894
- Alexander James Harrison 1894 - 1914
- Jesse Hickling Ison 1914 - 1940
- George Edwin Jenkins 1941 - 1947
- Albert John Bennitt 1948 - 1969
- John Lloyd Rochfort Crawley 1969 - 1974
- Ian Harker 1975 - 1983
- David John Parker 1984 - 1989
- Ian David Houghton 1990 - 1995
- John Christopher (Kit) Widdows 1995 - 2007
- Catherine Mary Lack 2009 - 2018
- Ben Doolan 2019–Present

== The organ ==
An organ was built in the church by Elliot and Hill in 1832.

A new organ by Vincent and Co. replaced the Elliot and Hill instrument in 1902, which was rebuilt by Binns, Fitton and Haley in 1931. This in turn was extensively rebuilt by Harrison and Harrison in 1961. It is of some local renown, and in its heyday, many recitals by leading organitsts were played on it. A specification of the organ can be found on the National Pipe Organ Register. It is not typically used at services, the music being provided instead by a worship band.

The organ is not playable at present, however, a fundraising campaign is under way to bring it back into use after the required repairs and improvements are completed.

=== List of organists ===
- Mr. Ingham (later organist of St. Mary's Newcastle and Carlisle Cathedral)
- Charles Miller ca. 1834
- T.M. Richardson 1836 (temp?)
- Samuel Reay 1845 - 1847 (later organist of the Church of St. Mary Magdalene, Newark-on-Trent)
- Robert Potts 1847 - 1883
- James Moody Preston 1883 - 1888
- Frederick William Smallwood 1900 - 1921 - ????
- Eric Morris 1949-1952
- Donald Egner 1952-1954
- Kenneth Miller 1954-1956
- Donald Easton Wright 1956-1957
- Howard Layfield 1957-1962
- Donald Easton Wright 1962-1982
- Donald Halliday (1982–1996)
- Martin Charlton 1992 -2021
- Ian Macdonald 1996 -

== Twinning ==
- Parish Church of St Helier (with which St Thomas's is twinned)
