= Tameside Reporter =

English weekly newspaper

- Type: Weekly newspaper
- Format: Tabloid
- Owner: Quest Media Network Ltd
- Editor: Nigel Skinner
- Founded: 14 April 1855; 171 years ago
- Language: English
- Headquarters: Ashton-under-Lyne, England
- ISSN: 1746-949X
- Website: tamesidereporter.com

The Tameside Reporter is a locally based weekly newspaper which primarily serves the Metropolitan Borough of Tameside. It is one of very few remaining independently owned newspapers in the country and has existed since 1855. The group previously distributed a free weekly newspaper, called the Ashton Reporter in recognition of the group's origins, and continues to publish the Glossop Chronicle.

== History ==
The original 1855 publication's name was the Ashton Weekly Reporter, subtitled the Stalybridge and District Chronicle. It cost three halfpence and covered news primarily from Ashton-under-Lyne, Stalybridge, Mossley, Dukinfield, Droylsden, Hooley Hill, Denton and Hyde. The original Ashton Weekly Reporter with its circulation of 5,000 became the Ashton and Stalybridge Reporter. On 24 September 1859, 31-year-old William Hobson died of a kidney disorder and Edward Hobson became more involved in the running of the newspaper with the continued support of his surviving son.

By 1886, circulation had exceeded 9,000. The rise in numbers was met by another name change, dropping Stalybridge from the title to become the Ashton Reporter. The following year, Edward Hobson senior died aged 66. Edward junior was the next to take the helm, aided by 19-year-old John Andrew, who had worked his way up from errand boy to a respected journalist at the paper. Edward's sister Martha was also involved, helping out as book keeper-cum-cashier. Martha and John's relationship blossomed and they were later married.

The Evening Reporter was introduced in 1876 and proved a success. This saw Hobson and Andrew moving from the restricted Stamford Street premises. Andrew commissioned architects John Eaton & Son to design plans for a new office and contractors J. Barton and Son built the new premises on Warrington Street, overlooking Ashton Market. The first edition was printed there on 11 January 1879. The site was occupied by Marks and Spencer from the mid-1960s to 2013.

Business boomed and in the 1880s the company bought six new Linotype machines to replace the out-dated presses. Type was then set up as a page in wooden frames, from which moulds of papier-mâché were made. These were used to make stereotype plates, which were lowered by hoist to the ground floor. Here they were fitted to the 'Victory' rotary presses ready for printing.

Andrew died in 1906 leaving his two sons, Edward and William, to take control of the Reporter and one of the brothers' first moves was to buy a new three-deck Foster press. In 1914, coinciding with the outbreak of the First World War, the Evening Reporter ceased publication after issuing 8,104 editions. On 4 November 1919, the flags on the Reporter office roof and Ashton Town Hall flew at half-mast to mark the death of Edward Andrew. Edward's brother William was now left in charge of the business.

In 1925, the Reporter became a limited company and with the paper's continuing success and demand for bigger issues, the Foster press was enlarged, allowing for a 16-page edition to be printed. In 1934 the Reporter acquired the North Cheshire Herald, merging it with their Hyde Reporter. In 1937 the group took on the Glossop Chronicle.

Gerald Andrew became managing director at the end of 1961, after the death of his uncle, William Andrew. At this time circulation stood at around 90,000, having risen from more than 50,000 before the war. Gerald revolutionised the paper in 1962 when news appeared on the front page for the first time (previously only advertisements were present). In October 1966, the Reporter moved out of Warrington Street to Waterside Mill off Whitelands Road, Ashton, where a new high-speed Crabtree Viscount rotary press was installed, which allowed colour printing.

After spending years fighting off advances from United Newspapers, who were keen to buy the Reporter Group, Gerald Andrew finally conceded in February 1980. The change of ownership brought about more changes. Towards the end of 1984 the Denton, Droylsden and Mossley offices were closed. In March 1986, Ashton Weekly Newspapers left Waterside Mill and moved to Park House, Acres Lane, Stalybridge.

The number of titles in the group was reduced from 14 to eight. The Audenshaw Reporter merged with the Ashton Reporter and a Stalybridge and Dukinfield title was launched. Bredbury and Romiley, and Marple, ceased to have their own editions of the North Cheshire Herald. Droylsden and East Manchester were merged. Initially, the High Peak Reporter was absorbed by the Glossop Chronicle, but a few months later was reinstated.

In 1985, in a bid to compete with the Tameside Advertiser, the Reporter launched a short-lived free sheet of its own called the Tameside Leader.

The Reporter appeared in tabloid form for the first time on March 7, 1986. At first it had a red masthead but this was quickly changed to blue. The Co-operative Press of Manchester did the typesetting. Printing took place at Central Lancashire printers at Wigan.

Circulation began to tail off in the 1960s accelerating over the following 20 years as free newspapers gained in popularity. By the early 1990s only the Glossop Chronicle retained any buoyancy. A radical redesign, instituted by Frank Whalley when he became editor in 1993, had no effect and in many ways only made things worse. The decision to drop amateur dramatics was particularly badly received. A trio of glossy colour magazines - In High Peak, In Tameside and In Saddleworth - only added to the financial losses. (Some years earlier a magazine called Juzz Jazz had lasted for only a handful of issues).

In 1994 the Reporter began to move to the Apple Macintosh QuarkXPress system. It had first used direct input in early 1987. Soon after, composing was taken over by Lockie Press of Golbourne. Around 1990 the process was moved to the Burnley Express, as was printing.

United Newspapers received an offer for Ashton Weekly Newspapers in 1997 and decided to accept. On 16 August the newly formed Reporter and Chronicle Newspapers Ltd legally took control. Heading the new firm were Martin Lusby and Barrie Holden, supported by backers 3i and the Royal Bank of Scotland. The pair previously held top-level positions with EMAP Newspapers. Martin Lusby was installed as chairman and Barrie Holden was managing director.

The number of titles was quickly reduced to two - the Tameside Reporter and the Glossop Chronicle. Printing was moved around the country, to wherever offered the best deal. The Hyde office was closed as was the office on Old Street, Ashton, which the Reporter had occupied since the 1960s. The paper briefly used a room in the old post office on Warrington Street but by the start of the 21st century it no longer had a presence in its home town. The Glossop Chronicle office was sold in 2012.

Full colour was quickly introduced. In 2007 the number of titles was increased with the reintroduction of an Ashton Reporter, this time a free newspaper covering the Ashton area.

Like all other newspapers the Reporter was hit hard by the global banking crisis of 2007/8. It closed in September, 2012, but was relaunched on 25 October. Reporter and Chronicle Newspapers Ltd sold the publications to the New Charter Housing Association which promised a new look for both titles, investment and growth. Much of the existing editorial team was left in place.

New Charter established Quest Media as an umbrella organisation to run the Reporter and Tameside Radio, which came into its ownership in 2013. In 2015 both the newspaper and radio station were moved from Stalybridge to Cavendish Mill, Cavendish Street, Ashton-under-Lyne, marking the Reporter's return to the town of its birth after a gap of more than ten years.

In 2026 the Reporter offices moved to Globe Square, Dukinfield.

On October 1, 2026, the paper announced its print edition will cease and all remaining staff will be transferred to sister papers.

== Milestones ==
- 1855 First issue of the Ashton Weekly Reporter and Stalybridge and Dukinfield Chronicle published on 14 April.
- 1858 Name changed to Ashton and Stalybridge Reporter on 10 April.
- 1866 Name of paper changes to Ashton Reporter (27 October).
- 1870 John Andrew marries Martha Ann Hobson, daughter of Edward Hobson.
- 1873 First edition of Gorton and Openshaw Reporter published in January.
- 1876 First Evening Reporter published (6 December).
- 1879 First editions printed at Warrington Street, Ashton (11 January).
- 1885 First edition of Cotton Factory Times (15 January).
- 1889 First edition of Yorkshire Factory Times (September).
- 1890 First editions of (Hull) Workman's Times (6 June) one of the first newspapers to support the Independent Labour Party.
- 1892 Last edition of the (Railway) Workman's Times (2 April).
- 1906 John Andrew dies on March 30. Buried in Dukinfield Cemetery.
- 1907 Last edition of the Yorkshire Factory Times.
- 1914 Last edition of the Evening Reporter (4 August).
- 1918 Price of Reporter increased to 2d.
- 1925 Reporter becomes limited company on 30 July.
- 1934 Reporter takes over North Cheshire Herald on 12 June. Retires Hyde Reporter title.
- 1936 Reporter takes over Ashton Herald on 15 June.
- 1937 Reporter takes over Glossop Chronicle (1 February).
- 1937 Cotton Factory Times ceases publication (2 July).
- 1962 News appears on front page for first time (19 October).
- 1966 Reporter leaves Warrington Street. Moves to Waterside Mill, Whitelands Road, Ashton.
- 1967 First Moston edition.
- 1974 Gorton and Openshaw Reporter renamed East Manchester Reporter South edition (26 April).
- 1980 J Andrew and Co. bought by United Newspapers.
- 1984 Denton, Droylsden and Mossley branch offices closed in the summer.
- 1986 Reporter relaunched as tabloid. Moves to Park House, Acres Lane, Stalybridge (March). Number of titles cut from 13 to eight. Melbourne Street, Stalybridge, office closed.
- 1993 Ashton Reporter renamed Ashton and Audenshaw Reporter (29 July).
- 1997 Reporter Group sold to Barrie Holden and Martin Lusby (18 August). Titles reduced to two: Tameside Reporter and Glossop Chronicle.
- 2012 Ashton Weekly Newspapers comes into ownership of New Charter Housing Group (October).
- 2015 Reporter moves to Cavendish Mill, Ashton.
- 2018 Reporter and Chronicle both print a special one-off broadsheet edition to commemorate the centenary of the end of the First World War.
- 2026 Reporter offices move to Globe Square, Dukinfield.

== Editor history ==
- 1855–1859 – William Hobson
- 1859–1867 – Edward Hobson Snr
- 1867–1881 – Edward Hobson Jnr.
- 1881–1906 – John Andrew/Nathan Stewart
- 1906–1919 – Edward Hobson Andrew
- 1919–1930 – Henry Bryson
- 1930–1952 – John Middlehurst
- 1952–1974 – David Charles Newham Jones
- 1974–1978 – Bill Williamson
- 1978–1993 – Duncan (Alan) Williamson
- 1993–1997 – Frank Whalley
- Aug–Nov 1997 – Nigel Skinner
- 1997–1999 – Catherine Bellis
- 1999–2000 – Hamish McGregor
- 2000–2023 – Nigel Skinner
- Aug-Oct 2023 - Lisa Burns
- 2023 - 2025 - Simon Drury
- 2025 - Nigel Skinner
