= Muriel Lloyd Prichard =

British academic, economist, and writer

- Lloyd Prichard in 1958
- Born: Muriel Florence Jolliffe; 13 September 1905; Pontypool, Wales
- Died: 23 October 1991 (aged 86); Edinburgh, Scotland
- Education: University of Cambridge
- Occupations: Academic, writer
- Notable work: An Economic History of New Zealand

Muriel Florence Lloyd Prichard (née Jolliffe) (1905–1991) (Note: Although many sources spell her surname as Lloyd-Prichard, she herself did not hyphenate her married name. The birth/death dates of 1906–1992 given by the National Portrait Gallery are incorrect, as is the 1938 birthdate given by VIAF.) was a British academic, economist, and writer.

== Early life and education ==
Muriel Florence Jolliffe was born in Pontypool, Wales on 13 September 1905, the daughter of Frederick and Edith Jolliffe (née Rosser). Her father was a gas company clerk; her mother was a suffragette who believed that their four children (two girls and two boys) should all receive a similar level of education.

She received an M.A. in Economics and Political Science from the University of Wales in 1930 and, in 1949, a PhD in Economics from the University of Cambridge.

In November 1939, she married John Lloyd Prichard (1886–1954), a major in the Royal Army Service Corps.

== Career ==
In the 1940s, Lloyd Prichard served as secretary of the North Wales Women's Peace Council. She maintained an interest in social issues such as feminism and the peace movement throughout her life.

In the 1950s she lectured in economics at the University of Cambridge, and was a researcher in the Department of Political Economy at University College London.

In 1957, she was elected as a Cambridge City councillor for the Romsey ward. In 1958, representing the Labour Party, she became the first woman to stand as a parliamentary candidate for the constituency of Newcastle-on-Tyne North, but lost to the incumbent Conservative candidate, R.W. Elliott.

In 1959, she moved to New Zealand, where she became a senior lecturer and later an associate professor of economic history at the University of Auckland.

In 1964, she was an invited speaker at the Australian Congress for International Co-operation and Disarmament in Sydney.

In 1971, she returned to the UK, settling in Scotland. She died in Edinburgh on 23 October 1991. Prior to her death, she had been working on a book on Scottish migration to New Zealand.

== Publications ==
Lloyd Prichard is probably best known for her 1970 book An Economic History of New Zealand, and her edition of the collected works of Edward Gibbon Wakefield (1968). She collaborated with Auckland University accountancy professor Bruce Tabb on several monographs. She also published on subjects such as the Chartist John Francis Bray, The Ladies of Llangollen, engineer Fleeming Jenkin, and prison reformer Sarah Martin.

Some of her manuscripts and papers are held by the University of Auckland.

== Bibliography ==
=== Books ===
- The United States as a Financial Centre, 1919–1933 (University of Wales Press, 1935), as M.F. Jolliffe
- An Economic History of New Zealand to 1939 (Collins, 1970)
- Economic Practice in New Zealand (Collins, 1970)

==== As editor ====
- John Francis Bray: A Voyage from Utopia (Lawrence & Wishart, 1957)
- Collected Works of Edward Gibbon Wakefield (Collins, 1968)
- The Future of New Zealand (Whitcombe & Tombs, 1964)
- Original Papers Regarding Trade in England and Abroad drawn up by John Keymer (Augustus M. Kelley, 1967)

=== Selected articles and monographs ===
- "The Ladies of Llangollen" (1945). Percy Brothers: London.
- "Understanding Korea". The Asiatic Review. January 1946, pp. 246–269.
- "Sarah Martin, 1791–1843: The Prisoners' Friend". The Howard Journal of Criminal Justice. July 1949. Vol 7 No 4, pp. 219–224.
- "Norfolk Friends' Care of Their Poor, 1700–1850". Journal of the Friends' Historical Society. Part I, Vol 39 (1947). Part II, Vol 40 (1948).
- "The Decline of Norwich". The Economic History Review, Vol. 3, No. 3 (1951), pp. 371–377.
- "The Alexander Family's Discount Company". Journal of the Friends' Historical Society. Vol 49 No 3 (Autumn 1960).
- The New Zealand General Election of 1960 (1961), with Bruce Tabb. University of Auckland.
- "Professor Fleeming Jenkin, 1833–1885 Pioneer in Engineering and Political Economy", with A.D. Brownlie. Oxford Economic Papers, Vol. 15, No. 3 (November 1963), pp. 204–216.
- "Wakefield Changes His Mind About the 'Sufficient Price'". International Review of Social History, Vol. 8, No. 2 (1963), pp. 251–269.
- Who Finances New Zealand Companies (1966), with Bruce Tabb. Blackwood & Janet Paul.
- One Hundred Years of the Auckland Gas Co. Ltd. (1968), with Bruce Tabb. Auckland Auckland Gas Co. Ltd.
