= 1940 Newcastle upon Tyne North by-election =

UK parliamentary by-election

← 1935	7 June 1940	1945 →

Constituency of Newcastle upon Tyne North
- Turnout: 22.0% (▼48.3%)
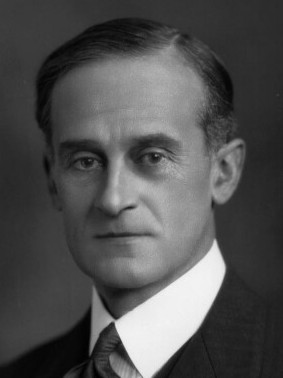
	First party	Second party
		Con
Candidate	Cuthbert Headlam	Henry Grattan-Doyle
Party	Ind. Conservative	Conservative
Popular vote	7,380	2,982
Percentage	71.2%	28.8%
Swing	N/A	▼48.2%
MP before election
Nicholas Grattan-Doyle
Conservative
Elected MP
Cuthbert Headlam
Ind. Conservative

The 1940 Newcastle upon Tyne North by-election was a parliamentary by-election held on 7 June 1940 for the British House of Commons constituency of Newcastle upon Tyne North.

== Previous MP ==
The seat had become vacant when the constituency's Conservative Party Member of Parliament (MP), Sir Nicholas Grattan-Doyle, had resigned from Parliament on 10 April, aged 77. He had been the constituency's MP since its creation for the 1918 general election.

== Candidates ==
During World War II, unopposed by-elections were common, since the major parties had agreed not to contest by-elections when vacancies arose in seats held by the other parties; contests occurred only when independent candidates or minor parties chose to stand. In keeping with the agreement, neither the local Labour Party and Liberal Party fielded a candidate in Newcastle North.

The Conservative Party candidate was Henry Grattan-Doyle, whose selection split the local Conservative Association. A group broke away to form the Newcastle North (1940) Conservative Association, and they fielded Sir Cuthbert Headlam as an "Independent Conservative" candidate.

Headlam had been MP for Barnard Castle from 1924 to 1929 and from 1931 to 1935, and had held several junior ministerial posts. He had also contested the Gateshead by-election in 1931, coming a close second in what had been a safe seat for Labour.

== Result ==
On a very low turnout, the result was an overwhelming victory for Headlam, who took 71% of the votes. Returned to the House of Commons, he promptly took the Conservative Whip, and held the seat as a Conservative until he retired from Parliament at the 1951 election.

Newcastle upon Tyne North by-election, 7th June 1940
Party	Candidate	Votes	%	±%
Ind. Conservative	Cuthbert Headlam	7,380	71.2	New
Conservative	Henry Grattan-Doyle	2,982	28.8	−48.2
Majority		4,398	42.4	N/A
Turnout		10,362	22.0	−48.3
Independent gain from Conservative		Swing		

== See also ==
- Newcastle upon Tyne North constituency
- 1957 Newcastle upon Tyne North by-election
- Newcastle upon Tyne
- List of United Kingdom by-elections (1931–1950)
- United Kingdom by-election records
