= 103.6 FM =

FM radio frequency

The following radio stations broadcast on FM frequency 103.6 MHz:

== United Kingdom ==
- BBC Radio Bristol in Weston-super-Mare and North Somerset
- BBC Radio Northampton in North Northamptonshire
- BBC Radio Wiltshire in Swindon
- LCR in Lincoln
- Tameside Radio
- The Beat London in Harlesden
