= Charlie Glyde =

British socialist politician

Charles Augustus Glyde (1869 – August 1923) was a British socialist politician.

Born in Leeds, Glyde moved to Bolton with his family in 1887. He joined the Salvation Army, but soon became disillusioned. The Social Democratic Federation's (SDF) local organiser was Tom Mann, who greatly impressed Glyde, and Glyde joined the party. In 1890, he moved to Bradford, working as an organiser for the National Union of Gasworkers and General Labourers, and was active in the Manningham Mills strike. After the strike, he was a founder member of the Bradford Labour Union, and also joined the Fabian Society. Later, he followed the Labour Union into the Independent Labour Party (ILP), while still retaining his SDF membership.

In 1904, Glyde was elected to Bradford City Council, representing Tong. While on the council, he championed free school meals, and the rights of unemployed people. Although he stood down in 1911, he contested and won the seat again in 1913. He published a local socialist newspaper, the Bradford Vanguard, which he used to vociferously criticise World War I. For this, he was prosecuted under the Defense of the Realm Act.

By 1920, Glyde was in poor health, and he retired from political activity, dying three years later.

Party political offices
Preceded by John Palin	Yorkshire Division representative on the Independent Labour Party National Administrative Council; 1914–1915	Succeeded by Ben Riley
