= William Nunn =

Conservative Party politician in the United Kingdom

William Nunn (20 March 1879 – 16 December 1971) was a Conservative Party politician in the United Kingdom.

At the 1931 general election, Nunn was elected as member of parliament (MP) for Whitehaven constituency in Cumberland. He lost his seat at the 1935 general election to the Labour Party candidate Frank Anderson.

He returned to the House of Commons in June 1940, at an unopposed by-election in the Newcastle upon Tyne West constituency following the death of the Conservative MP Sir Joseph Leech. At the 1945 general election, he lost the seat to Labour's Ernest Popplewell, and did not return to Parliament.

Nunn was also a British diplomat and was the final British Ambassador to Siam (now Thailand) and in his latter days would recount stories of his 'adventures' there to children.

Parliament of the United Kingdom
Preceded by M. Philips Price	Member of Parliament for Whitehaven; 1931–1935	Succeeded by Frank Anderson
Preceded by Sir Joseph Leech	Member of Parliament for Newcastle upon Tyne West; 1940–1945	Succeeded by Ernest Popplewell
