= John Palin (politician) =

British politician (1870–1934)

John Henry Palin (1870 – 22 May 1934) was a British trades unionist and Labour Party politician.

By the early twentieth century, he was active in the trade union movement in Bradford, Yorkshire. He was a member of the executive of the Amalgamated Society of Railway Servants (ASRS) in 1901 and 1902, and in 1905 he was the Bradford branch secretary of the Amalgamated Association of Tramway and Vehicle Workers In 1910 he was the President of the Bradford Trades and Labour Council. He was also an Independent Labour Party member of Bradford City Council.

In 1912 he was approved as a Labour Party candidate for the next general election, although he was not allocated to any constituency. In 1911 the ASRS nominated him to contest Bradford East. However, the anticipated general election was delayed until 1918 due to the First World War.

At the 1918 general election he unsuccessfully contested Bradford North. He finally succeeded in being elected to the Commons at the 1924 general election, when he was returned as Member of Parliament for Newcastle upon Tyne West. He held the seat in 1929, but was defeated when there was a large swing against Labour in 1931.

He was Lord Mayor of Bradford in 1924 - 1925.

Parliament of the United Kingdom
Preceded by Cecil Beresford Ramage	Member of Parliament for Newcastle upon Tyne West; 1924–1931	Succeeded by Joseph William Leech
Party political offices
Preceded by Ben Riley	Yorkshire Division representative on the Independent Labour Party National Administrative Council; 1913–1914	Succeeded by Charlie Glyde
