= Bradford Trades Council =

Trade union organisation in England

- Bradford Trades Union Council
- Founded: 16 July 1872
- Headquarters: 17–21 Chapel Street, Bradford
- Location: England

Bradford Trades Council brings together trade unionists in and around Bradford, in West Yorkshire in England.

== History ==
The first Bradford Trades Council was founded in July 1867 by six local unions. They were inspired by the London tailors' strike, but feared that it would result in a ban on trade unions. It was led by president William Angus, secretary C. D. Dewhurst, and treasurer Robert Bayes. It sent questions to the candidates in the 1867 Bradford by-election, but ultimately decided against backing either candidate. Dewhurst represented the council at the first Trades Union Congress, but he read a paper which had not been approved by the trades council. It was also found that his union had not paid its affiliation fees, so he was replaced as secretary. He had returned to the post by 1869, but the council ceased operating soon afterwards.

A new Bradford Trades Council was founded on 16 July 1872 at the Black Bull. It was led by president Samuel Shaftoe, vice president Robert Scott, treasurer W. Scruton, and secretary Edward Riley. In its early years, it focused on campaigning for a nine-hour maximum working day, and on providing support for unions which were in dispute.

From the 1880s, the council worked closely with what became the Amalgamated Society of Dyers; one of its leading figures, William Otty, became president of the trades council in 1882, and from 1897, the council was based at the trades hall which was owned by the union.

The Manningham Mills strike of 1890–1891 moved many leading figures on the council away from the Liberal Party. James Bartley, William Henry Drew and Joseph Hayhurst founded the Bradford Labour Union in 1891. The trades council sponsored a joint slate with the Labour Union in the municipal elections, putting up Bartley, Edwin Halford, Andrew Hopkinson, and Shaftoe, on a platform of an eight-hour day for municipal workers, and municipal contracts to employ trade union members. The council also sponsored Ben Tillett's unsuccessful candidacy in Bradford West in the 1892 UK general election. The Labour Union became part of the Independent Labour Party (ILP), and from 1902, the trades council began working with the ILP and local trade unions in the Workers' Municipal Federation (WMF). The trades council became known as the Bradford Trades and Labour Council, and was the central body for the local Labour Party, but only stood candidates in agreement with the ILP and Social Democratic Federation. From 1914 to 1936, the WMF published the Bradford Pioneer.

The first woman to become a delegate to the trades council was Julia Varley, in 1899; five years later, she was the first woman to become a member of its executive.

The trades council opposed World War I, prompting some local Labour councillors to ask it to drop "Labour" from its name. This was rejected, and the council continued on a radical course, supporting the Hands Off Russia campaign, and organising the 1926 UK general strike in the city. It has remained active ever since, and in recent years has been known as the Bradford Trades Union Council.

== Officers ==
=== Secretaries ===
1872: Edward Riley
1882: Samuel Shaftoe
1893: George Cowgill
1895: James Bartley
1899: Fred Jowett
William Henry Drew
1906: Walter Barber
c.1930: Revis Barber
c.1948: Derek Smith
1990s: Mike Quiggin

=== Presidents ===
1872: Samuel Shaftoe
1875: Robert Appleyard
1877: Samuel Shaftoe
1882: William Otty
1884: Edwin Halford
1894: C. L. Robinson
Theophilus Warner
as of 1900: A. N. Harris
1921: Thomas William Stamford
1924:
as of 1926: Harold Child
1942: Jim Backhouse
1970: Ludwig Baruch
1973: Pat Wall
1990: Ronnie Fieldhouse
2000s: Altaf Arif
