= Bradford Labour Union =

- Founded: 1891
- Dissolved: January 1893
- Succeeded by: Independent Labour Party
- Ideology: Labourism
- Political position: Left-wing

The Bradford Labour Union was a political party based in Bradford in England, which was an important forerunner of the Independent Labour Party.

In late 1890 and early 1891, there was a major strike at the Manningham Mills in Bradford. Following the strike, many local trade unionists believed that they needed an independent organisation which would nominate trade unionists for political posts who would not be affiliated with the Liberal Party or the Conservative Party.

The Labour Union was founded in 1891 by a group of trade unionists, including James Bartley, Charlie Glyde, Edward Hartley, William Henry Drew and Joseph Hayhurst. They agreed to run a joint slate in the municipal elections with the Bradford Trades Council, and they put up Bartley, Edwin Halford, Andrew Hopkinson, and Samuel Shaftoe, on a platform of an eight-hour day for municipal workers, and for municipal contracts to employ trade union members. Only Shaftoe won a seat, and he worked closely with the Liberal Party, but in 1892 the socialist Fred Jowett was elected, as was Leonard Robinson. Additionally, Drew was elected to the school board.

This success led the Labour Union to decide to stand a candidate in the 1892 general election. Initially, it agreed to sponsor Robert Blatchford in Bradford East, but he withdrew, and instead the party sponsored Ben Tillett in Bradford West. Tillett was jointly sponsored by the Labour Union and the Trades Council, and he took 30.2% of the vote, although this was only enough for third place.

The party inspired the formation of Labour Unions in other towns and cities: Colne Valley, Huddersfield and Salford. This increase in interest in independent labour representation led to support for a national party, and an arrangements committee was established by interested activists at the 1892 Trades Union Congress. This held a conference in Bradford from 14–16 January 1893, chaired by Drew, which founded the Independent Labour Party. The Bradford Labour Union merged into the new body.
