= 1940 Newcastle upon Tyne West by-election =

UK Parliamentary by-election

The 1940 Newcastle upon Tyne West by-election was held on 5 July 1940. The by-election was held due to the death of the incumbent Conservative MP, Joseph Leech. It was won unopposed by the Conservative candidate William Nunn.

Newcastle upon Tyne West by-election, 5 July 1940
Party	Candidate	Votes	%	±%
Conservative	William Nunn	Unopposed	N/A	N/A
Conservative hold				
