= William Henry Drew (textile worker) =

Personal details
- Born: 1854 Exeter
- Died: 1933 Bradford
- Party: Independent Labour Party

William Henry Drew (1854 - 29 January 1933) was a British textile worker, early trade unionist and one of the founders of the Independent Labour Party.

== Early years ==
W. H. Drew was born in Exeter in 1854 and by the mid-1860s was working in agriculture. He began to be increasingly interested in politics at around the time that John Duke Coleridge QC was contesting Exeter for the Liberal Party.

Around 1862 Drew migrated to Jarrow then on to Shipley where he began work as a wool comber at Pricking Mill. Next he started work as a workhouse man at Airedale Mills and then as a worsted weaver. By 1887 he was an active organiser for the West Riding Power Looms Weavers' Association and was on the executive committee for the next twenty years.

== Trade unionist ==
Around this time Drew became a pioneer of independent labour politics and textile trade unionism. Along with Allen Gee and Ben Turner he was recruited by the Yorkshire Factory Times in 1889 as a correspondent. In December 1890, the workers at the Manningham Mills went on strike. Drew, Gee and Turner provided leadership for the strikers and the strike gave a new impetus to trade unionism and a reinvigorated hope for independent political action. The strike may have failed in its primary objectives but after it had finished, the Bradford Labour Union was established.

Throughout this time Drew was suffering from bronchitis and constant ill health. In 1891 he became president of the Bradford Labour Union and stood successfully for the Bradford School Board and in 1892 he gave evidence to the Royal Commission on Labour. By 1893, Drew's importance to the labour movement was very much recognised. At the inaugural conference of the Independent Labour Party in Bradford, Drew was selected to take the chair at the conference although, when it was taken to a vote, Keir Hardie was elected chairman. Drew was however, unanimously elected as vice chairman, and he was also elected to the party's first National Administrative Council.

By the mid-1890s Drew had helped found the Bradford Central Labour Club of which he became the President only to resign in 1895 due to a change of rules which allowed non-union members to hold office. In 1893 the Bradford Unemployed Emergency Committee was established, Drew being a leading member. This organisation united the Independent Labour Party, the Bradford Trades Council and the Social Reform Union. He encouraged this organisation to conduct its own survey of unemployment which firmly discredited the statements put out by the Bradford Board of Guardians.

Having been on the trades council since 1887, he became secretary in 1898, following the departure of James Bartley. Ben Turner stated on his work, "He put the Trades Council on to its wider basis. He paved the way."

On the Education Act 1902 he showed fierce opposition and in 1907 left for Canada, returning to Bradford and dying on 29 January 1933.
