= Cecil Ramage =

Scottish barrister, actor and politician (1895–1988)

Cecil Ramage MC

Member of Parliament for Newcastle upon Tyne West
- In office 6 December 1923 – 29 October 1924
- Preceded by: David Adams
- Succeeded by: John Henry Palin

Personal details
- Born: Cecil Beresford Ramage; 17 January 1895 Edinburgh, Scotland
- Died: 22 February 1988 (aged 93) Bournemouth, England
- Party: Liberal
- Spouse: Cathleen Nesbitt (m. 1921)
- Children: 2
- Education: Pembroke College, Oxford

Military service
- Allegiance: United Kingdom
- Branch/service: British Army
- Rank: Major
- Unit: The Royal Scots
- Battles/wars: First World War
- Awards: Military Cross

Cecil Beresford Ramage, MC (17 January 1895 – 22 February 1988) was a Scottish barrister, actor and Liberal politician.

== Life ==
Following his education at the Edinburgh Academy, Ramage was commissioned as an officer in the Royal Scots at the outbreak of World War I. He served in Gallipoli, Palestine and Egypt and was awarded the Military Cross.

Following the war, he went up to Pembroke College, Oxford, where he became President of the Oxford Union. At Oxford he first took to the stage, appearing in Antony and Cleopatra with Cathleen Nesbitt, whom he married in 1921. They had two children. Instead of taking up acting as a profession after university, Ramage read law. He was called to the bar at the Middle Temple, and practised on the Oxford Circuit.

At the 1922 general election, he was the Liberal candidate for the constituency of Newcastle West, but was defeated by David Adams of the Labour Party. Another election was held in 1923 and Ramage stood again and was elected as Member of Parliament (MP). He was only to be in the Commons for a short period, as he was defeated at the subsequent general election in 1924. He was the Liberal candidate at Southport at the 1929 general election, but failed to be elected.

By this time, Ramage was a professional actor, appearing in New York, the West End of London and toured with the Old Vic Company in the Mediterranean. He had a number of minor roles in films, including Secret of Stamboul (1936), and Nicholas Nickleby (1947). His final film role was as the prosecution counsel in Kind Hearts and Coronets (1949), whose devastating cross-examination of Louis Mazzini does much to discredit him.

His career eventually declined, and he retired from the stage and was separated from his wife, Cathleen Nesbitt, who died in 1982, aged 93.

== Death ==
Cecil Beresford Ramage died in 1988, aged 93. Of the 64 former MPs who only served in the parliament of 1924, he was the last survivor, outliving his parliamentary service by 63 years.

== Filmography ==
Year	Title	Role	Notes
1932	C.O.D.	Vyner	
1932	The Strangler	Dr. Bevan	
1932	Account Rendered	Barry Barriter	Short
1933	Britannia of Billingsgate	Producer	
1933	On Secret Service	Ermete Davila	
1934	The Luck of a Sailor	Owner	
1934	Freedom of the Seas	Berkstrom	
1934	Blossom Time	Johann Vogl	
1934	The Night of the Party	Howard Vernon	
1934	What Happened Then?	Defense	
1935	Be Careful, Mr. Smith		
1935	McGlusky the Sea Rover	Auda	
1935	King of the Damned	Major Ramon Montez	
1936	Love in Exile	John Weston	
1936	Lonely Road	Maj. Norman	
1936	The Secret of Stamboul	Prince Ali	
1936	The Mill on the Floss	Luke	Uncredited
1937	Cafe Colette	Petrov	
1937	Return of a Stranger	John Forbes	
1937	The Last Rose of Summer		
1939	Black Eyes		
1945	I Live in Grosvenor Square	Trewhewy	
1947	The Life and Adventures of Nicholas Nickleby	Sir Mulberry Hawk	
1948	Blanche Fury	Prosecuting Counsel	
1949	Kind Hearts and Coronets	Crown Counsel	(final film role)

Parliament of the United Kingdom
Preceded by David Adams	Member of Parliament for Newcastle upon Tyne West; 1923–1924	Succeeded by John Henry Palin
