= Robert Brown (English politician) =

English politician

Robert Crofton Brown (16 May 1921 – 3 September 1996) was an English Labour Party politician.

Brown was a district gas inspector with the Northern Gas Board and a branch secretary of the National Union of General and Municipal Workers. He was secretary of his Constituency Labour Party and a councillor on Newcastle upon Tyne Borough Council.

Brown was elected as the member of parliament (MP) for Newcastle upon Tyne West in 1966, then following boundary changes, for Newcastle upon Tyne North from 1983, retiring in 1987.

Parliament of the United Kingdom
Preceded by Ernest Popplewell	Member of Parliament for Newcastle upon Tyne West; 1966–1983	Constituency abolished
Preceded by William Elliott	Member of Parliament for Newcastle upon Tyne North; 1983–1987	Succeeded by Doug Henderson
