= C. Allen Clarke =

English humourist (1863–1935)

Charles Allen Clarke (1863–1935), most widely known as C. Allen Clarke and also writing as Teddy Ashton, was an English working-class humourist, novelist, journalist, social investigator and socialist from Lancashire. An Independent Labour Party (ILP) member and friend of Robert Blatchford, Clarke succeeded Joseph Burgess as editor of the Yorkshire Factory Times.

== Life ==
Born in Bolton, Clarke left school at thirteen, when he moved with his parents to Mirfield and worked half-time in a mill. The family soon moved back to Bolton, where he continued to work, while studying in his spare time at Hulton School. He became a pupil-teacher there, and he continued to teach for seven years, after which he took a post with the Bolton Evening News. Initially, his work was mundane, copying records and compiling directories, but the Bolton engineers' strike of 1887 inspired him to become more political, and he joined the Social Democratic Federation (SDF) the following year, when Tom Mann founded a local branch.

Clarke founded his own newspaper in 1890, the Labour Light, at which he employed James Haslam in his first journalistic role. The two also worked with J. R. Clynes in an attempt to found a trade union for cotton piecers in Lancashire. Both projects were unsuccessful, but Clarke founded a new paper, the Bolton Trotter, in 1891, which ran as a weekly publication until 1893, together with an annual, the Trotter Christmas Annual. Teddy Ashton's Journal was started in 1896 as a continuation of the Trotter, with Teddy Ashton's Christmas Annual as the associated annual. Clarke continued to edit the publication (as Teddy Ashton's Northern Weekly, Teddy Ashton's Weekly Fellowship and Teddy Ashton's Weekly) for fourteen years.

Clarke's best-known novel, The Knobstick (1893), was originally serialised in the Yorkshire Factory Times. It took the 1887 Bolton engineers' strike as its backdrop, though Clarke added both a love story and a sensational crime plot.

Clarke moved towards spiritualism in the 1890s, affected by some family tragedies and apparently encountering the psychic powers of his second wife.

Clarke stood as the Labour Representation Committee candidate for Rochdale at the 1900 UK general election, supported by both the Social Democratic Federation (SDF) and the Independent Labour Party (ILP), of which he was now also a member. He opposed the Second Boer War, and called for state pensions and the nationalisation of the railways and coal mines. He took 901 votes and third place. In the same year, he moved back to Bolton to become editor of the Northern Weekly, then back to Blackpool in 1906, where he continued to edit the Weekly and Teddy Ashton's Journal. He also wrote for the Liverpool Weekly Post and Blackpool Gazette, and produced a series of novels.

Clarke trained his younger brother, Tom Clarke, as a journalist, and Tom later became editor of the Daily News and News Chronicle.

== Legacy ==
In 1937, Cornelius Bagot of Blackpool donated Little Marton windmill to be maintained in memorial to Clarke. As of 2014, it is maintained by The Friends of Little Marton Windmill.

== Works ==
- The Lass at the Man and Scythe, 1889.
- In Darkest Huddersfield and one way out of it: or, why have we no public library, 1891.
- John O'God's Sending, 1891.
- The Knobstick: a story of love and labour, 1893.
- The Friend of Santa Claus, and Other Stories, 1893.
- The Little Weaver, 1893.
- Tales of a Deserted Village, 1894.
- The Witch of Eagle's Crag, 1895.
- Old Tales for Young Folks, 1895.
- "Voices", and Other Verses, 1895.
- What Do We Live For?, 1896.
- A Daughter of the Factory, 1898.
- The Effects of the Factory System, 1899.
- A Great Catch: a comedietta in three scenes: for five females and a baby
- Woman's Chance: a comedietta in three scenes: for three females, 1901.
- Driving, 1901.
- The Eternal Question - Is There Another Life?, 1902.
- Starved into Surrender, 1904.
- Lancashire Lasses and Lads, 1906.
- The Red Flag, 1907.
- Windmill Land: rambles in a rural, old-fashioned country with chat about its history and romance, 1916.
- More Windmill Land: rambles in a rural, old-fashioned country with chat about its history and romance, 1918.
- Moorlands & Memories, 1920.
- Tum Fowt Sketches. no. 1-32, 1922.
- The Story of Blackpool, 1923.
- Windmill Land Stories, 1924.
- Blackpool Walks and Rides in the Fylde & Over-Wyre, 1924.
- Teddy Ashton's Lancashire Poems, 1928.
- Milltown Mischief: True Tales of Daring and Adventure in Victorian Bolton, Palatine Books, 2011
