= Bradford Pioneer =

- Type: Weekly
- Founded: 1913
- Ceased publication: 1936
- Political alignment: Socialist
- Language: English
- Headquarters: Bradford
- OCLC number: 23069586

Bradford Pioneer is a defunct newspaper published in Bradford between 1913 and 1936 under the auspices of the Bradford Independent Labour Party, Bradford Trades Council and Workers' Municipal Federation.

The 1913 volume contains several early articles by J. B. Priestley, and on 27 July 1917 it published A Soldier's Declaration by Siegfried Sassoon.

In 1914, Joseph Burgess was the editor. Another editor was Frank Betts, father of Barbara Castle.

== Editors ==
1913: Joseph Burgess
1915: William Leach
1920s: Fred Jowett
1920s: William Leach
1926: Ethel Stead
1929: William Leach
1935: Frank Betts
