= Catherine McKinnell =

British politician (born 1976)

Catherine McKinnell MP
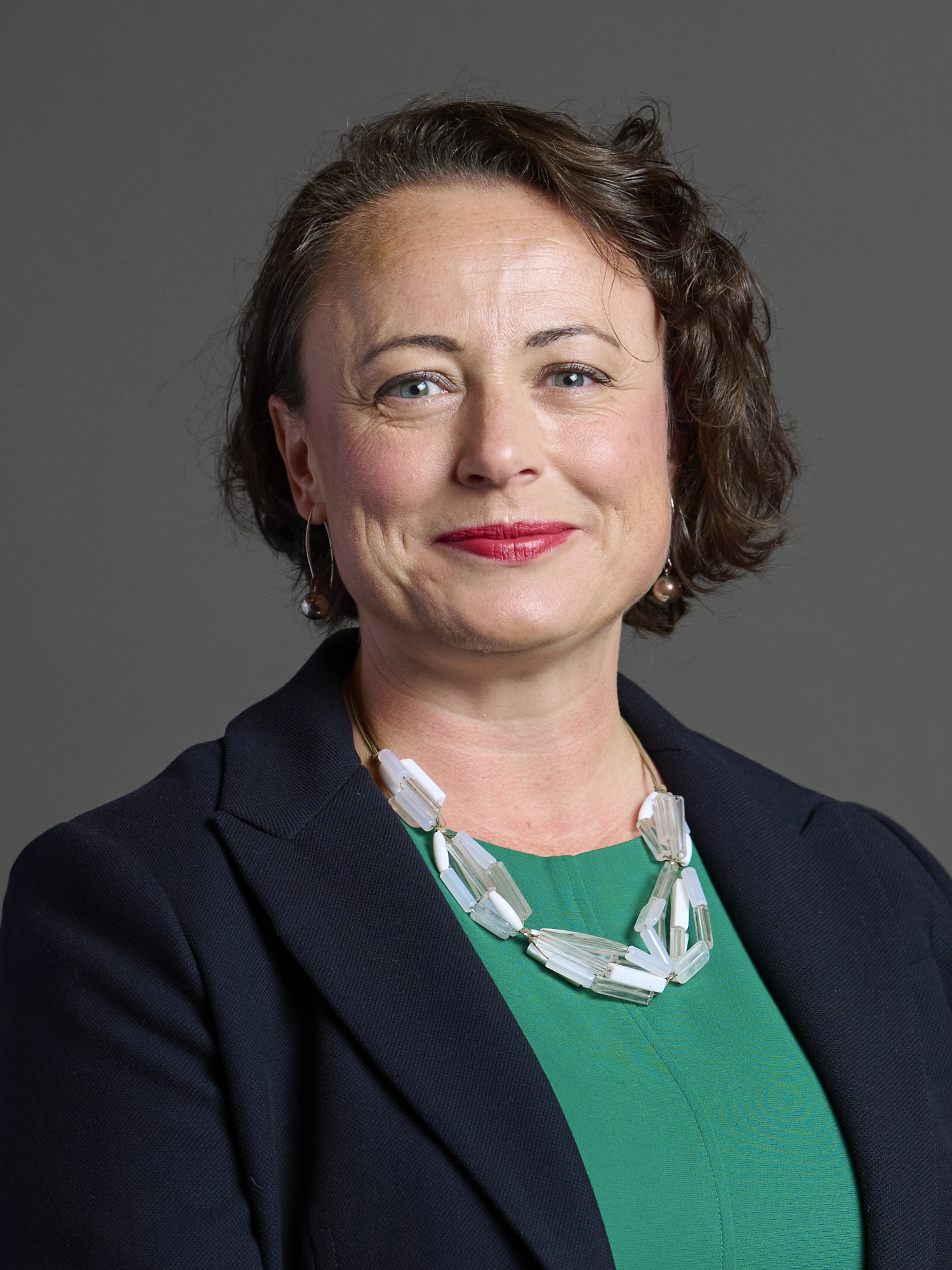
- Official portrait, 2024

Minister of State for Prisons, Probation and Reducing Reoffending
- Incumbent
- Assumed office 21 July 2026
- Prime Minister: Andy Burnham
- Preceded by: The Lord Timpson

Minister of State for School Standards
- In office 8 July 2024 – 6 September 2025
- Prime Minister: Keir Starmer
- Preceded by: Damian Hinds
- Succeeded by: Georgia Gould

Member of Parliament for Newcastle upon Tyne North
- Incumbent
- Assumed office 6 May 2010
- Preceded by: Doug Henderson
- Majority: 17,762 (36.5%)

Chair of the Petitions Committee
- In office 29 January 2020 – 5 September 2023
- Preceded by: Helen Jones
- Succeeded by: Cat Smith
Shadow portfolios
Shadow Cabinet
2015–2016	Attorney General
Shadow Frontbench
2023–2024	Schools
2013–2015	Exchequer Secretary
2011–2013	Children and Families
2010–2011	Solicitor General

Personal details
- Born: Catherine Grady; 8 June 1976 (age 50) Newcastle upon Tyne, England
- Party: Labour
- Education: University of Edinburgh; Northumbria University
- Website: catherinemckinnellmp.co.uk

Catherine McKinnell (born 8 June 1976) is a British Labour Party politician who has served as the Member of Parliament (MP) for Newcastle upon Tyne North since 2010. She has been Minister of State for Prisons, Probation and Reducing Reoffending since 2026. McKinnell served as Minister of State for School Standards from 2024 to 2025.

== Early life and career ==
Catherine McKinnell was born on 8 June 1976 in Newcastle upon Tyne, where she attended Sacred Heart Catholic High School in Fenham. She studied politics and history at the University of Edinburgh. After leaving Edinburgh, she went on to study Law at Northumbria University.

After university, McKinnell worked as an employment solicitor at Dickinson Dees, a Newcastle law firm.

== Parliamentary career ==
At the 2010 general election, McKinnell was elected to Parliament as MP for Newcastle upon Tyne North with a vote share of 40.8% and a majority of 3,414.

In October 2010, the Labour Leader Ed Miliband appointed McKinnell to the role of Shadow Solicitor General, where she was responsible for the party's response to the News International phone hacking scandal. She raised questions about the Crown Prosecution Service's handling of the scandal, including a question to the Attorney General in the House of Commons asking why the CPS had refused for so long to admit that there were grounds to bring prosecutions.

In October 2011, during a shadow ministerial reshuffle, McKinnell was made shadow children's minister, shadowing Tim Loughton. In that post she criticised the adoption process as too slow and called for immediate improvements in support for social workers and family courts to speed up the process. She also accused the government of doing too little to help children for whom adoption was not suitable and following this, requested a guarantee that the government would give priority to placing children in "happy homes."

In June 2012, after the resignation of Peter Hain, she was then moved to become Shadow Exchequer Secretary to the Treasury, replacing Owen Smith. McKinnell backed a campaign by ActionAid on international tax laws and tabled amendments to the Budget which would have required the government to monitor the impact on developing countries of changes to so-called Controlled Foreign Companies regulations. She said, "It seems a false economy to invest ... in changes that will undermine the very progress towards which our international aid money, which increases year on year, is going".

Also in June 2012, McKinnell publicly criticised Take That singer Gary Barlow following newspaper allegations of tax avoidance made against him. McKinnell agreed that Barlow should consider returning his recently awarded OBE if allegations of tax avoidance were proven "because it doesn't send out the right messages to ordinary people who are paying their fair share of tax".

At the 2015 general election, McKinnell was re-elected as MP for Newcastle upon Tyne North with an increased vote share of 46.1% and an increased majority of 10,153.

McKinnell was made Shadow Attorney General in September 2015 by Labour leader Jeremy Corbyn, but resigned in January 2016, citing party infighting, family reasons and the ability to speak in parliament beyond her legal portfolio. She supported Owen Smith in the failed attempt to replace Jeremy Corbyn in the 2016 Labour Party (UK) leadership election.

McKinnell has been a prominent campaigner for the Women Against State Pension Inequality campaign. In December 2015, following the acceleration of the equalisation of the State Pension Age, she argued that the acceleration has happened too quickly and left female pensioners uncertain. McKinnell was also made Vice Chair of the recently established All-Party Parliamentary Group on the WASPI campaign.

At the snap 2017 general election, McKinnell was again re-elected with an increased vote share of 55.4% and an increased majority of 10,349. She was again re-elected at the 2019 general election, with a decreased vote share of 45.4% and a decreased majority of 5,765.

In September 2020, McKinnell was appointed a vice-chair of Labour Friends of Israel.

In the 2023 British shadow cabinet reshuffle she returned to the frontbench as Shadow Schools Minister, replacing Stephen Morgan.

At the 2024 general election, McKinnell was again re-elected, with an increased vote share of 50.3% and an increased majority of 17,762. She served as Minister of State for School Standards from 2024 to 2025. She left the Starmer government in the 2025 British cabinet reshuffle.

In July 2026, she was appointed to the new government as Minister of State at the Ministry of Justice by Andy Burnham.

Parliament of the United Kingdom
Preceded by Doug Henderson	Member of Parliament for Newcastle upon Tyne North; 2010–present	Incumbent
Political offices
Preceded by Owen Smith	Shadow Exchequer Secretary to the Treasury; 2012–2013	Succeeded by Shabana Mahmood
Preceded by The Lord Bach	Shadow Attorney General; 2015–2016	Succeeded by Karl Turner
