= Joseph Burgess =

British journalist, writer and Labour politician

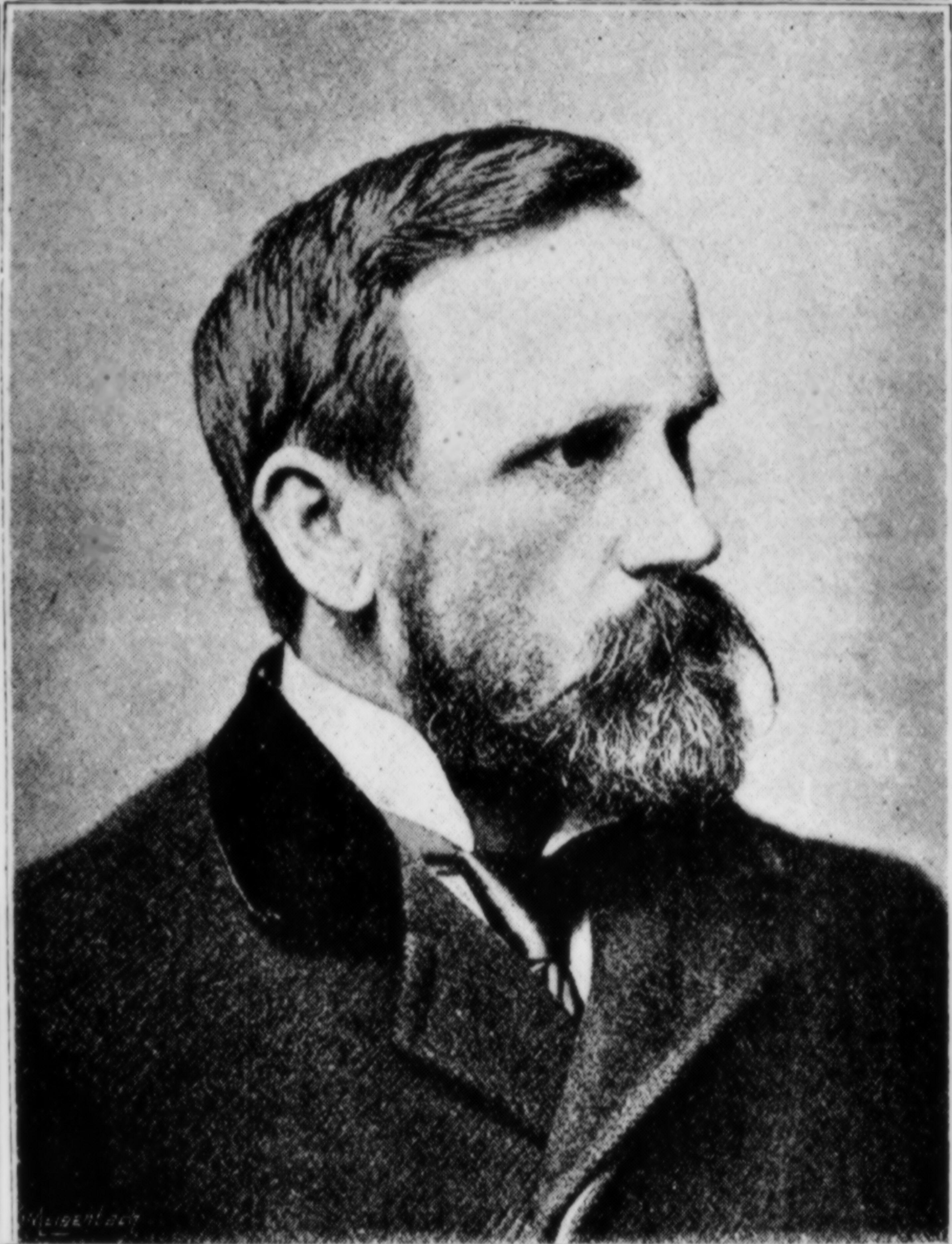
Joseph Burgess ca. 1895

Joseph Burgess (1853–1934) was a British journalist, writer and Labour politician.

He was born on 3 July 1853 in Failsworth, Lancashire, the third of six children of handloom weavers, and was educated at a print works school in Failsworth. He started work in a card-cutting room at the age of six and worked as a cotton operative until he was 28. He married three times, having six children. He died in January 1934.

== Career ==
He was active in the creation of the Independent Labour Party (ILP) and the Labour Party. He was elected to the first National Administrative Council of the ILP, and served on it again from 1899 until 1901. He unsuccessfully ran as an ILP parliamentary candidate for Leicester in 1894 and 1895 before taking a role of organising secretary for the ILP between 1897 and 1902. He was a member of the Glasgow City Council between 1902-5 and unsuccessfully ran as an ILP candidate for Glasgow Camlachie in 1906, and Montrose in 1908 and 1910. He resigned from the ILP in 1915.

Throughout his career he was involved in newspapers:

- 1881: correspondent for a local newspaper
- 1884: started his own short-lived paper, the Oldham Operative
- 1885–89: sub-editor of the Cotton Factory Times
- 1889–91: manager of the Yorkshire Factory Times
- 1891–93: editor of Workman's Times
- 1914: editor of the Bradford Pioneer
- 1919: editorial staff for the London Evening Standard and the Pall Mall Gazette

== Publications ==
- John Burns: the rise and progress of a right honourable (1911)
- Homeland or Empire (1915)
- British agriculture versus foreign tributes (1925)
- Will Lloyd George replace Ramsay MacDonald (1926)
