= Listed buildings in Bradford (Toller Ward) =

Toller is a ward in the metropolitan borough of the City of Bradford, West Yorkshire, England. It contains 16 listed buildings that are recorded in the National Heritage List for England. Of these, one is listed at Grade II*, the middle of the three grades, and the others are at Grade II, the lowest grade. The ward is to the northwest of the centre of Bradford, and is largely residential. Most of the listed buildings are cottages in pairs, rows or blocks. The ward contains Manningham Mills, the largest mill in Bradford, which is listed at Grade II*. The other listed buildings include a lodge and a fountain associated with Chellow Dean, a large house and its entrance lodge, a former public house, a school, a group of almshouses, an archway with gates formerly leading to a house, and a church.

== Key ==
Grade	Criteria
II*	Particularly important buildings of more than special interest
II	Buildings of national importance and special interest

== Buildings ==
Name and location	Photograph	Date	Notes	Grade
9–13 Crow Tree Lane and barn 53.80454°N 1.80115°W	—	18th century	A row of sandstone cottages at right angles to the road, it was extended in about 1800–30, and has quoins, a stone slate roof, and two storeys. Attached to No. 9 is a barn with overhanging eaves, and a segmental archway with a quoined surround and voussoirs.	II
76 and 80 Daisy Hill Lane; 53.80872°N 1.80293°W	—	Late 18th century	A pair of cottages at right angles to the road, they are in sandstone with quoins, and stone slate roofs with saddlestones. There are two storeys, the doorways have squared jambs, some windows are mullioned and others have been altered.	II
1–4 Crow Tree Lane and barn/stable 53.80418°N 1.80096°W	—	c. 1800	A row of four cottages stepped in pairs up a hill, they are in sandstone with dentilled eaves and stone slate roofs. There are two storeys, the windows are mullioned with three lights, and a bow window has been inserted into No. 4. Attached to No. 1 is a small stable or barn with a saddlestone on its gable end.	II
33, 37 and 39 Daisy Hill Lane; 53.80760°N 1.80307°W	—	c. 1800	A block of sandstone cottages with a sill band, block brackets to the eaves, and partly hipped stone slate roofs with a saddlestone and shaped kneelers. There are two storeys and an L-shaped plan. In the upper floor of No. 33 are two windows, and an oval light with a dovecote above. No. 39 has an angled corner containing a doorway with a hood on carved console brackets, and on both fronts are full-height bow windows. Elsewhere the windows are mullioned.	II
57–63 Daisy Hill Lane; 53.80816°N 1.80296°W	—	c. 1800	Probably originally a farmhouse and barn, later converted into four cottages. They are in sandstone with quoins, and a stone slate roof with saddlestones and shaped kneelers. There are two storeys, and the windows either have single lights, or are mullioned with some mullions removed and sashes inserted.	II
80 and 82 Duckworth Road; 53.80563°N 1.79183°W	—	c. 1800–20	A pair of sandstone cottages that have stone slate roofs with saddlestones. There are two storeys, the doorways have squared jambs, and the windows are mullioned with two lights.	II
64–74 Daisy Hill Lane; 53.80845°N 1.80279°W	—	Early 19th century	A row of six cottages stepped up a hill, they are in sandstone with block bracketed eaves and stone slate roofs. There are two storeys, the doorways have squared jambs, some windows have single lights, and the others are mullioned with two or three lights and some mullions removed.	II
New Row; 53.80844°N 1.80209°W	—	Early 19th century	A long row of sandstone cottages with block bracketed eaves and stone slate roofs. There are two storeys, and the doorways have squared jambs. Above each doorway is a single-light window and the other windows are mullioned with three lights, and some mullions have been removed.	II
Former Queen public house 53.80791°N 1.80285°W		Early 19th century	A cottage that was converted into a public house later in the 19th century, and has since been used for other purposes. It is in sandstone with a stone slate roof and two storeys. The doorway has pilasters and a cornice, and other doorways have been blocked. The windows are mullioned with two lights.	II
Lady Royd House and gate lodge 53.80458°N 1.79673°W		1865	The large house, which was extended in 1878, and later used as a school, is in sandstone, with roofs of stone slate and Welsh slate. There are two and three storeys, basements and attics, and an irregular plan. The windows vary, including some that are mullioned and transomed. In the entrance front is a doorway with engaged Corinthian columns, a segmental arch, and stepped buttresses, and above it is a triangular oriel window. Behind, is a tower with a splayed square spire. The separate gate lodge has two storeys and slate roofs, and a circular tower with a circular spire and a weathervane. To the side of the lodge is an arched gateway with wrought iron gates.	II
Main Block, Lilycroft Board School; 53.80734°N 1.77949°W		1872–73	The block is in sandstone with slate roofs, and is in Gothic style. It has a long range and one storey, and includes gables, gabled cross-wings, and a gabled hall. To the left of the hall is a tower with an octagonal belfry and a short spire pierced by gablets.	II
Manningham Mills; 53.80822°N 1.77921°W		1873	The largest textile mill in Bradford, its buildings are in Italianate style, and consist of two long six-storey blocks, a Composite chimney, a boiler house, large sheds, and reservoirs. The main front extends for 350 yards (320 m) and the chimney is 250 feet (76 m) high. The buildings are in sandstone on rusticated basements, and have dentilled cornices and deep panelled parapets. Features include a staircase tower with a pavilion roof, and iron cresting, and a large portal with a heraldic achievement in the parapet. The chimney has a massive pedestal, full height round-headed panels, and projecting cornices.	II*
Rand's Almshouses; 53.80280°N 1.78112°W		1876	The almshouses are in stone, and consist of a central single-storey range flanked by projecting two-storey gabled wings. In the centre is an entrance with a double porch under a pointed arch, with a stepped gable containing the date and an inscription, and a finial. The windows are mullioned with two lights. The ground floors of the wings have splayed corners each containing a shield, and corbels carrying the upper floor. There are paired windows in each floor, those in the upper floor with pointed-arched hood moulds containing a shield in the tympanum.	II
Fountain in Lower Reservoir, Chellow Dean; 53.80879°N 1.81673°W	—	c. 1880–90	The fountain is in cast iron. It has a baluster stem, and two tiers with scalloped lip basins. The fountain is surmounted by a ball finial.	II
Lodge, Chellow Dean; 53.80717°N 1.81310°W	—	c. 1880–90	The lodge has one storey and an attic, and a cruciform plan. The gables have scalloped bargeboards, and most of the windows are mullioned and transomed. There is a lean-to verandah porch on cast iron shafts.	II
Archway with gates, Chellow Lane; 53.80526°N 1.80807°W	—	c. 1887	The archway, which provided the entrance to a house now demolished, is in stone with wrought iron gates. The arch is round-headed and chamfered, above it is an ogee-shaped gable containing a shield in the tympanum, and with gableted and moulded coping. On the top is a representation of a bird's neat. The gates have an elaborate design.	II
St Chad's Church; 53.80454°N 1.77904°W		1912–13	The church is in stone with roofs of Westmorland slate. It consists of a nave, north and south aisles, a north porch, and a sanctuary flanked by vestries. The sanctuary has an apse, and there is another apse at the east end of the north aisle. At the west end is a baptistry between two entrances.	II
