= Nicholas Grattan-Doyle =

British politician

Sir Nicholas Grattan-Doyle, DL (18 August 1862 – 14 July 1941), of The Manor House, Birtley, County Durham (now Tyne and Wear), was a Unionist Party politician in the United Kingdom.

== Career ==
He contested the January 1910 General Election as Liberal Unionist candidate for Gateshead, finishing second. On 27 July 1915, Grattan-Doyle was appointed a deputy lieutenant of County Durham. He was elected as member of parliament (MP) for Newcastle upon Tyne North at the 1918 general election, and held the seat until his resignation in 1940, aged 78, the age he was when he died the following year.

Parliament of the United Kingdom
| New constituency | Member of Parliament for Newcastle upon Tyne North; 1918–1940 | Succeeded by Cuthbert Headlam |
