= Doug Henderson (Labour politician) =

British politician (born 1949)

Minister of State for the Armed Forces
- In office 28 July 1998 – 29 July 1999
- Prime Minister: Tony Blair
- Preceded by: John Reid
- Succeeded by: John Spellar

Minister of State for Europe
- In office 5 May 1997 – 28 July 1998
- Prime Minister: Tony Blair
- Preceded by: David Davis
- Succeeded by: Joyce Quin

Member of Parliament for Newcastle upon Tyne North
- In office 11 June 1987 – 12 April 2010
- Preceded by: Robert Brown
- Succeeded by: Catherine McKinnell

Personal details
- Born: 9 June 1949 (age 77) Edinburgh, Scotland
- Party: Labour
- Spouse: Jan Graham (divorced) Geraldine Daly (divorced) Married Jane Bowles - 9 July 2022
- Children: Keir Henderson (born 1986) and Ella Henderson (born 2000)
- Education: University of Strathclyde
- Occupation: Company Director

Douglas John Henderson (born 9 June 1949) is a British Labour Party politician who was the Member of Parliament (MP) for Newcastle upon Tyne North from 1987 to 2010. In 2015, he was appointed chairman of Falkirk F.C., a position he held until June 2017.

== Early life ==
Doug Henderson was born in Edinburgh, Scotland, and educated at the Waid Academy, Anstruther, before going on later to study economics at both the Central College of Commerce, Glasgow, and the University of Strathclyde. He was an apprentice engineer with Rolls-Royce in Glasgow for two years from 1966, before joining British Rail as a clerk for a year in 1968. After university he joined the National Union of General and Municipal Workers trade union as a research officer in 1973 and remained employed by the union (and its successor the GMB Union) until he was elected to parliament 14 years later. In 1975, he was appointed as the GMB's Scottish organiser, moving to become the organiser in Newcastle upon Tyne in 1985.

== Parliamentary career ==
He was the chairman of the Scottish Labour Party in 1984 and was elected to the House of Commons at the 1987 General Election for Newcastle North in Tyneside following the deselection of the sitting Labour MP Robert Brown. Henderson held the seat with a majority of 5,243, and in the 2005 election, he received 50% of the vote with a majority of 7,023; this was down from a majority of 14,450 and 60.2% share in 2001.

He was promoted to the frontbench by Neil Kinnock in 1988 as a spokesman on trade and industry, until he moved under the new leadership of John Smith to serve as a spokesman on the environment in 1992. Following Smith's death in 1994 he was moved by Tony Blair to become the Deputy shadow Leader of the House of Commons and spokesman on John Major's citizens' charter. In 1995, he became a home affairs spokesman. When the first Blair government was elected at the 1997 General Election he was made a Minister of State at the Foreign and Commonwealth Office with the brief of Minister for Europe, before moving to the Ministry of Defence in 1998 as the Minister for the armed forces. He was sacked in 1999 amid speculation that his close association with and perceived loyalty to the Chancellor of the Exchequer Gordon Brown eventually cost him his government job, and he became an increasingly outspoken backbencher. In May 2006, Henderson joined other Labour MPs in urging Prime Minister Tony Blair to set a date to step down following the dismissal of Charles Clarke as Home Secretary. He stated that "Quite frankly, Tony Blair has done his bit and it is now time for him to tell us when he is going to go." He is the vice chairman of the all party groups on the Philippines; Malaysia; and the chocolate and confectionery industry. He spoke in favour of government plans to replace Trident in the debate on 14 March 2007.

Henderson is also employed as a member of fast food chain McDonald's advisory board, work that "normally takes about 10 days a year and a bit of preparation." for which he receives a salary of £25,000 per year. This information was revealed after MPs were required to supply details of non-Parliamentary earnings.

During the coverage of leaked Parliamentary expenses details in 2009, it was revealed that Henderson claimed £800 for telephone calls from a house in Anstruther, Scotland, in 2007/08. Henderson confirmed that he lives and works at his home in Fife, more than 150 miles from his constituency in Newcastle. The Sunday Telegraph newspaper rated him as "one of the worst for value-for-money," in their assessment of MPs "based on how much work they did in parliament compared to their overall expenses." The MP was present at half of House of Commons votes in 2007/08 and claimed £151,860 in expenses.

On 4 July 2009, Henderson announced his intention to stand down at the next general election.

Member of Council of Europe and Western European Union which became ESDA. Chair of the WEU/ESDA Defence Committee 2008–2010. Vice Chair of the Migration Committee of the Council of Europe.

== Personal life ==
Doug Henderson is a season ticket holder of Falkirk F.C. and was appointed club chairman in 2015, where he held that position until stepping down in June 2017. He married Janet Margaret Graham in 1974 and they had a son, Keir, before they divorced.

He married Geraldine Daly in 2002 with whom he had a daughter, Ella. They subsequently divorced.

He married Jane Bowles in July 2022.

Parliament of the United Kingdom
Preceded by Robert Brown	Member of Parliament for Newcastle upon Tyne North; 1987–2010	Succeeded by Catherine McKinnell
Political offices
Preceded by David Davis	Minister for Europe; 1997–1998	Succeeded by Joyce Quin
