= Cuthbert Headlam =

British politician (1876–1964)

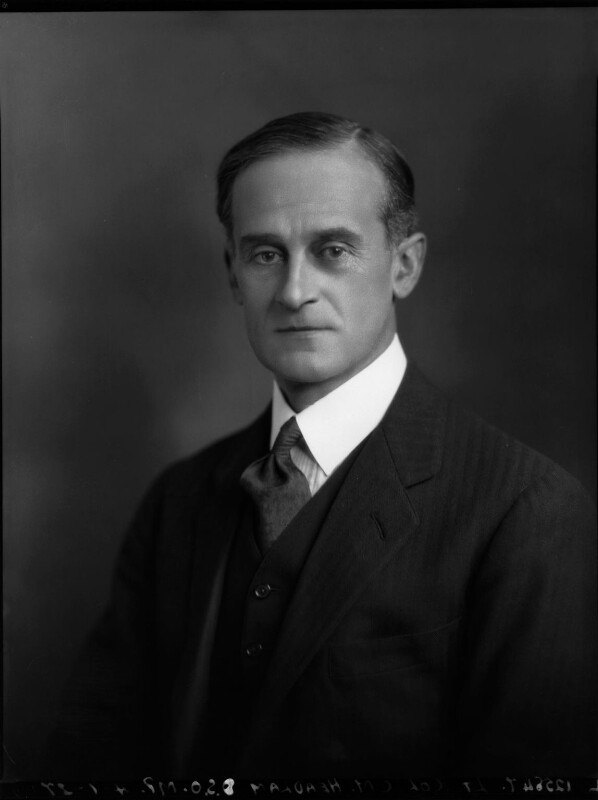
Cuthbert Headlam

Sir Cuthbert Morley Headlam, 1st Baronet, DSO, OBE, TD, DL, JP (27 April 1876 – 27 February 1964) was a British Conservative politician.

== Career ==
Born in Barton upon Irwell, Lancashire, the third of the five sons of Francis John Headlam (1829–1908), stipendiary magistrate of Manchester, and his wife, Matilda (née Pincoffs). The Headlams were a minor gentry family with roots in north Yorkshire. His father was the seventh son of Rev. John Headlam. Thomas Emerson Headlam was one of his uncles, and the Right Rev. Arthur Headlam and his brother Sir James Headlam-Morley were two of his many cousins. Headlam was educated at King's School, Canterbury, and then read modern history at Magdalen College, Oxford, where he received his BA in March 1900.

He was a Clerk in the House of Lords 1897–1924 and became a barrister, Inner Temple in 1906. He served with the Bedfordshire Yeomanry from 1910 to 1926, was mentioned in despatches in the First World War and awarded the Distinguished Service Order and appointed an Officer of the Order of the British Empire, retiring as lieutenant colonel.

Headlam was elected as Member of Parliament (MP) for Barnard Castle at the 1924 general election. After the loss of his seat in 1929, he stood in the Gateshead by-election in June 1931, coming a close second in what had been a safe seat for Labour. He regained the Barnard Castle seat at the general election in October 1931, but was defeated again at the 1935 general election. He was returned to the House of Commons for a third time at a by-election in June 1940 as MP for Newcastle upon Tyne North, after standing as an "Independent Conservative" and beating the official Conservative Party candidate. He held the seat until he retired from Parliament at the 1951 general election.

Headlam served in government as Parliamentary and Financial Secretary to the Admiralty from 1926 to 1929; as Parliamentary Secretary to the Ministry of Pensions from 1931 to 1932; and as Parliamentary Secretary to the Ministry of Transport from 1932 to 1934.

Headlam was a Durham County Councilor from 1931 to 1939, and Justice of the Peace for the County of Durham. He was Chairman of the National Union of Conservative and Unionist Associations in 1941. He was created a baronet in the 1935 Birthday Honours and appointed a Privy Counsellor in 1945. He died in 1964 at his home in Bath, Somerset, aged 87.

== Diaries and papers ==
- Headlam, Cuthbert (1992). Stuart Ball (ed.). Parliament and Politics in the Age of Baldwin and MacDonald: The Headlam Diaries 1923–1935. Sources for Modern British History. London: The Historians' Press. ISBN 1-872273-01-7.
- Headlam, Cuthbert (1999). Stuart Ball (ed.). Parliament and Politics in the Age of Churchill and Attlee: The Headlam Diaries 1935-1951. Camden Fifth Series. Vol. 14. Cambridge: Cambridge University Press for the Royal Historical Society. ISBN 0-521-66143-9.
- Headlam, Cuthbert (2010). Jim Beach (ed.). The Military Papers of Lieutenant-Colonel Sir Cuthbert Headlam 1910-1942. Publications of the Army Records Society. Vol. 30. Stroud: The History Press for the Army Records Society. ISBN 978-0-7524-5846-5.

Parliament of the United Kingdom
Preceded by Moss Turner-Samuels	Member of Parliament for Barnard Castle; 1924–1929	Succeeded by Will Lawther
Preceded by Will Lawther	Member of Parliament for Barnard Castle; 1931–1935	Succeeded by Thomas Miles Sexton
Preceded by Sir Nicholas Grattan-Doyle	Member of Parliament for Newcastle-upon-Tyne North; 1940–1951	Succeeded by Gwilym Lloyd George
Baronetage of the United Kingdom
New creation	Baronet (of Holywell); 1935–1964	Extinct
