= Samuel Shaftoe =

British trade unionist

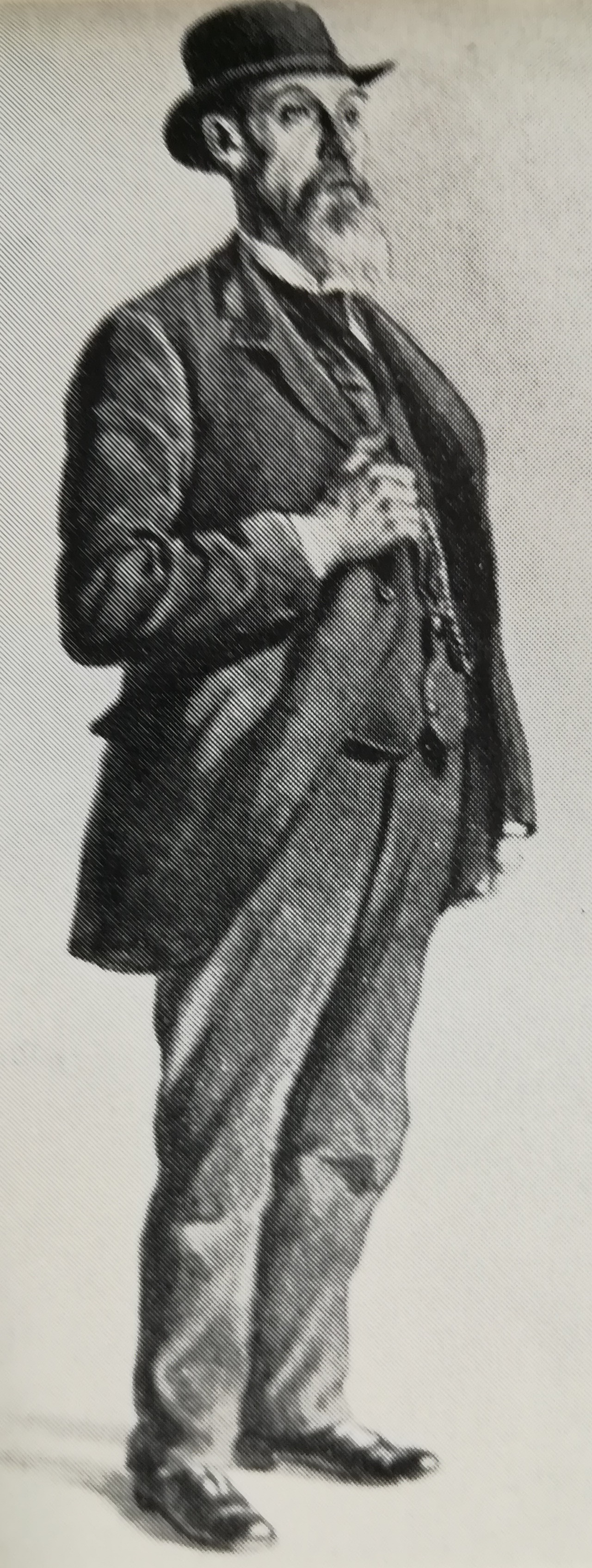
Shaftoe, at an unknown date

Samuel Shaftoe (25 May 1841 – 27 November 1911) was a British trade unionist.

Born in York, Shaftoe moved with his family to Kingston upon Hull when he was eleven, leaving school and becoming an apprentice basket maker. He joined the Basket Makers' trade union in 1862, and took part in a strike two years later, but lost his job as a result, and moved to Bradford to find work. There, he played a prominent part in a six-month long strike, and was then elected as the local secretary of the Yorkshire Skep and Basket Makers' Union.

Shaftoe immediately began campaigning for the union to expand its remit and provide benefits for members who were unable to work due to illness, and for families of deceased members. This was agreed, and in 1868 he was appointed as the union's general secretary. He led two strikes, both successful, resulting in increases in wages and a maximum nine-hour day.

In 1872, Bradford Trades Council was refounded, and Shaftoe was elected as its first president. He was seriously injured in 1875, and took two years out of union activism, but returned, then in 1882, instead became secretary of the trades council. He also regularly attended the Trades Union Congress (TUC), and was elected as President of the TUC when it met in Bradford in 1888. From 1891 until 1894, Shaftoe served on Bradford Town Council as a Liberal-Labour member, backed by the Bradford Labour Union. During this time, he was also prominent in the Labour Electoral Association, and these roles brought him into conflict with the Bradford Labour Union, who wanted labour candidates to be entirely independent of the Liberal Party. In 1893, he was defeated for his trades council post by a member of the new Independent Labour Party. Despite bad feelings, Shaftoe remained involved with the labour movement in Bradford, and also became the first working man in the West Riding of Yorkshire to become a magistrate.

By 1905, Shaftoe was suffering poor health and struggling for an income. The trades council persuaded the town council to pay him a small pension until his death in 1911.

== The Life and Legacy of Samuel Shaftoe: A Pioneering Trade Unionist ==
=== 1841 ===
- 25 May: Samuel Shaftoe is born at Dundas Street, York to Thomas Shaftoe and Mary (née Cowan).

=== 1850 ===
- Age 9: The Shaftoe family moves to Hull.

=== 1852 ===
- Age 11: Samuel is apprenticed to a basket maker.

=== 1862 ===
- Joins Basket Makers’ Union: Quickly becomes the union secretary.

=== 1865 ===
- Victimised in Hull Strike: Moves to Bradford.

=== 1866 ===
- Bradford District Secretary: Appointed for the Yorkshire Skep and Basket Makers’ Union.

=== 1868 ===
- General Secretary: Appointed for the union.

=== 1871 ===
- Major Dispute: Leads a successful strike reducing weekly working hours.

=== 1873 ===
- Major Dispute: Leads a successful strike for increased wages and a nine-hour workday.

=== 1872 ===
- Bradford Trades Council Reformed: Shaftoe becomes president.

=== 1877-1882 ===
- President: Serves as president of the Bradford Trades Council.

=== 1882 ===
- Newlands Mills Disaster: Advocates for victims and establishes a permanent legal compensation fund.

=== 1882-1893 ===
- Secretary: Serves as secretary of the Bradford Trades Council.

=== 1885 ===
- Campaign Success: Secures the appointment of a full-time stipendiary magistrate for Bradford.

=== 1888 ===
- TUC President: Elected president of the TUC conference held in Bradford.

=== 1887 ===
- Labour Electoral Association: Becomes secretary of the local association.

=== 1891 ===
- Manningham Mills Dispute: Supports strikers, leading to the formation of the Bradford Labour Union.

=== 1892 ===
- Magistrate: Appointed as the first working man in West Riding to be raised to the Bench.
- General Election: Labour Union contests local elections, challenging the Lib-Labs.

=== 1893 ===
- Trades Council Secretary: Replaced by George Cowgill.
- 11 May: Receives a testimonial of a timepiece and a hundred guineas.

=== 1891-1894 ===
- Town Council: Serves on the Town Council.

=== 1905 ===
- Pension: Granted a small pension by Bradford Corporation.

=== 1911 ===
- 27 November: Samuel Shaftoe dies.
- Funeral: Held at Bowling, Bradford, buried in Bowling Cemetery. The cortege includes the Lord Mayor of Bradford, magistrates, and prominent trade unionists.

Based on original article by Keith Laybourne and John Saville.

Trade union offices
Preceded by Edward Riley	Secretary of the Bradford Trades Council; 1882 – 1893	Succeeded by George Cowgill
Preceded by W. Bevan	President of the Trades Union Congress; 1888	Succeeded by Robert Ritchie
