= Ernest Popplewell =

British politician

The Right Honourable The Lord Popplewell CBE
- Popplewell in 1947

Opposition Deputy Chief Whip of the House of Commons
- In office 10 June 1955 – 23 October 1959
- Leader: Clement Attlee; Hugh Gaitskell
- Preceded by: Herbert Bowden
- Succeeded by: John Taylor

Member of the House of Lords Lord Temporal
- In office 6 June 1966 – 11 August 1977; Life Peerage

Member of Parliament for Newcastle upon Tyne West
- In office 5 July 1945 – 10 March 1966
- Preceded by: William Nunn
- Succeeded by: Robert Brown

Personal details
- Born: 10 December 1899
- Died: 11 August 1977 (aged 77)
- Party: Labour

Ernest Popplewell, Baron Popplewell, CBE (10 December 1899 – 11 August 1977) was a British Labour Party politician.

== Political career ==
In the Labour landslide at the 1945 general election, Popplewell was elected as Member of Parliament for Newcastle upon Tyne West. In 1951 he was appointed a Commander of the Order of the British Empire (CBE).

After his retirement from the House of Commons at the 1966 general election, he was made a life peer as Baron Popplewell, of Sherburn-in-Elmet in the West Riding of the County of York on 6 June 1966.

Parliament of the United Kingdom
Preceded by William Nunn	Member of Parliament for Newcastle upon Tyne West; 1945–1966	Succeeded by Robert Brown
Party political offices
Preceded by Herbert Bowden	Deputy Labour Chief Whip in the House of Commons; 1955–1959	Succeeded by John Taylor
