= Bruce Tabb =

New Zealand accountancy academic (1927–2022)

- Born: James Bruce Tabb; 3 March 1927; San Francisco, California, U.S.
- Died: 20 May 2022 (aged 95); Auckland, New Zealand
- Spouse: Julie Margaret Cooper (m. 1968)
- Children: 2

Academic background
- Education: University of Sheffield
- Thesis: Accountancy aspects of the takeover bids in Britain 1945–1965 (1968)
- Doctoral advisor: Charles Whittington-Smith

James Bruce Tabb (3 March 1927 – 20 May 2022) was a New Zealand accountancy academic who specialised in the history of accounting.

== Biography ==
Tabb was born in San Francisco on 3 March 1927 to New Zealanders Walter James Tabb and Christina Sarah Tabb (née Jespersen). The family returned to New Zealand in 1934, and Tabb was educated at Mount Albert Grammar School in Auckland. He later studied at Auckland University College, graduating with a Bachelor of Commerce degree in 1954, and subsequently earned a Master of Commerce degree in 1963.

In 1960, Tabb was appointed a full-time faculty member in the Department of Accountancy at the University of Auckland, and he rose to become a full professor and head of department. He completed a PhD at the University of Sheffield in 1968. The title of his doctoral thesis, supervised by Charles Whittington-Smith, was Accountancy aspects of the takeover bids in Britain 1945–1965. Following his retirement in 1990, Tabb was accorded the title of professor emeritus. He was also a Fellow of the New Zealand Institute of Chartered Accountants.

Tabb's research interests included the history of accounting and company finances, as seen in his doctoral thesis. In the 1960s, he collaborated with economist Muriel Lloyd Prichard, and they produced works including the book Who finances New Zealand companies? in 1966, and a history of the Auckland Gas Company, published in 1968. He was a contributor to the 1996 publication, The history of accounting: an international encyclopedia.

Tabb married Julie Margaret Cooper on 24 February 1968, and the couple had two children. He died at his home in Auckland on 20 May 2022, at the age of 95.

== Selected publications ==
- Wilton, R. L.; Tabb, J. B. (1978). "An investigation into private shareholder usage of financial statements in New Zealand". Accounting Education (May): 93–101.
- Tabb, J. B. (1981). "Reasons for the emergence of contested company take-overs in the 1950s". Accounting and Business Research. 11 (44): 323–330. doi:10.1080/00014788.1981.9729718.
- Tabb, J. B.; Frankham, C. B. (1986). "The Northern Steamship Company: the depreciation problem in the nineteenth century". The Accounting Historians Journal. 13 (2): 37–53. doi:10.2308/0148-4184.13.2.37.
