= Newcastle upon Tyne North =

Parliamentary constituency in the United Kingdom, 1918 onwards

Coordinates: 55°01′N 1°37′W

- Borough constituency for the House of Commons
- Interactive map of boundaries since 2024
- Location within North East England
- County: Tyne and Wear
- Electorate: 76,503 (March 2020)
- Major settlements: Newcastle upon Tyne

Current constituency
- Created: 1918
- Member of Parliament: Catherine McKinnell (Labour)
- Seats: One
- Created from: Newcastle-upon-Tyne

Newcastle upon Tyne North is a constituency (Note: A borough constituency (for the purposes of election expenses and type of returning officer)) represented in the House of Commons of the UK Parliament since 2010 by Catherine McKinnell of the Labour Party. (Note: As with all constituencies, the constituency elects one Member of Parliament (MP) by the first past the post system of election at least every five years.)

Under the 2023 review of Westminster constituencies, effective from the 2024 United Kingdom general election, the constituency underwent significant boundary changes, with only 41.3% of the previous seat being included in the redrawn one.

== Constituency profile ==
Newcastle upon Tyne North is a constituency in Tyne and Wear. It covers the northern suburbs of Newcastle upon Tyne, some of which are in the neighbouring borough of North Tyneside. Included in the constituency are the neighbourhoods of Sandyford, Jesmond, Gosforth, Kenton, Fawdon, Newcastle Great Park, Benton and Forest Hall.

Newcastle upon Tyne has Roman-era origins as a fortress city and was urbanised during the Industrial Revolution as a leading centre for shipbuilding and heavy industry. This constituency consists mostly of affluent suburbs with many large detached and semi-detached properties, although there is some deprivation in Kenton which has a high quantity of council housing. These neighbourhoods have a history of coal mining and were redeveloped as residential areas during the 20th and 21st centuries. House prices here are generally below the national averages but considerably higher than the rest of North East England.

The constituency has a low average age; there is a high student population in Jesmond and Sandyford which lie close to Newcastle University and Northumbria University. Residents have average rates of homeownership and very high levels of education. Household income is higher than the regional average and the child poverty rate is very low. A high proportion of residents work in professional occupations, especially in the health and public sectors, and a low percentage claim unemployment benefits. White people made up 87% of the population at the 2021 census.

Most of Newcastle upon Tyne North is represented by Liberal Democrats at the local council level, with some Labour Party councillors elected in the North Tyneside neighbourhoods (Benton and Forest Hall). An estimated 58% of voters in the constituency supported remaining in the European Union in the 2016 referendum, higher than the nationwide figure of 48%.

== History ==
Parliament created this seat under the Representation of the People Act 1918 for the general election later that year. It was one of four divisions of the parliamentary borough of Newcastle-upon-Tyne, which had previously been represented by one two-member seat.

The constituency included much of Newcastle city centre from 1950 to 1983, despite the fact that the Newcastle upon Tyne Central constituency was retained, albeit with redrawn boundaries.

Following the local government reorganisation arising from the Local Government Act 1972, major boundary changes resulted in a constituency composed entirely of wards that did not form any part of the pre-1983 seat, which had been held by Conservative or Conservative Party affiliated candidates since 1918. The majority of the old Newcastle upon Tyne North wards moved to Newcastle upon Tyne Central. The newly constituted seat comprised northern and western suburbs of the expanded metropolitan borough of the City of Newcastle upon Tyne.

== Boundaries and boundary changes ==
=== Historic ===
==== 1918–1950 ====
- The County Borough of Newcastle upon Tyne wards of Dene, Heaton, Jesmond, St Andrew's, and St Thomas.

==== 1950–1983 ====
- The County Borough of Newcastle upon Tyne wards of Arthur's Hill, Elswick, Jesmond, Sandyford, and Westgate.

Boundaries redrawn to take account of expansion of the County Borough and redistribution of wards. Dene and Heaton transferred to Newcastle upon Tyne East. Expanded westwards and into parts of the city centre, gaining Arthur's Hill and Elswick from Newcastle upon Tyne West and Westgate from Newcastle upon Tyne Central.

==== 1983–2010 ====
- The City of Newcastle upon Tyne wards of Castle, Denton, Fawdon, Grange, Lemington, Newburn, Westerhope, and Woolsington.

Following the reorganisation of local authorities as a result of the Local Government Act 1972, the constituencies within the City of Newcastle upon Tyne were completely redrawn. The contents of the existing seat formed no part of the newly constituted version. With the exception of Sandyford, which was transferred to Newcastle upon Tyne East, the existing seat was absorbed into a redrawn Newcastle upon Tyne Central.

The new seat was made up of western parts of the now abolished constituency of Newcastle upon Tyne West, comprising the former Urban District of Newburn, the parts of Castle Ward transferred to the new metropolitan borough, previously in Hexham and a small area transferred from Wallsend.

==== 2010–2024 ====
Map of 2010–2024 boundaries

- The City of Newcastle upon Tyne wards of Castle, Denton, East Gosforth, Fawdon, Lemington, Newburn, Parklands, Westerhope, and Woolsington.

Minor changes due to redistribution of ward boundaries.

=== Current ===
Further to the 2023 review of Westminster constituencies, which came into effect for the 2024 general election, the composition of the constituency was defined as follows (as they existed on 1 December 2020):

- The City of Newcastle upon Tyne wards of: Castle (polling districts F04, F05 and F06); Dene & South Gosforth; Fawdon & West Gosforth; Gosforth; Kenton; Kingston Park South & Newbiggin Hall (polling district O04); North Jesmond; Parklands; South Jesmond.
- The Metropolitan Borough of North Tyneside wards of: Benton; Longbenton.

The constituency underwent wholesale changes, with the following areas being transferred out:

- The districts of Denton, Lemington, Westerhope and Newbiggin Hall to the new constituency of Newcastle upon Tyne Central and West;
- Callerton & Throckley ward (which includes the communities of Newburn and Woolsington) to Hexham; and
- The northern part of Castle ward, including Dinnington, to the new constituency of Cramlington and Killingworth.

The redrawn seat now comprises the following areas:

- Eastern parts of Gosforth, Fawdon, Parklands ward and most of Castle ward from the previous version of the seat;
- Kenton and western parts of Gosforth from Newcastle upon Tyne Central (abolished);
- Jesmond and Dene from Newcastle upon Tyne East (abolished); and
- The North Tyneside Borough wards of Benton and Longbenton from the North Tyneside constituency (abolished).

Following local government boundary reviews in both local authorities, the constituency now comprises the following:

- The City of Newcastle upon Tyne wards or part wards of: Castle (majority); Dene & South Gosforth; Fawdon & West Gosforth; Gosforth; Jesmond (nearly all); Kenton; Kingston Park & Dinnington (majority, comprising Kingston Park); Manor Park (very small part); Ouseburn (minority); Parklands & North North Gosforth.
- The Metropolitan Borough of North Tyneside wards or part wards of: Camperdown (small part); Forest Hall (most); Longbenton & Benton.

== Political history ==
Seat within Tyne and Wear (2010–2024)

From its creation in 1918, the seat was a safe Conservative Party seat, including six years of representation by Gwilym Lloyd George, who was aligned to the National Liberal Party but served as Home Secretary for almost three years until 1957 in a Conservative government. This continued until the 1983 general election, when the major boundary changes resulted in the majority of the old wards being moved to Newcastle upon Tyne Central, which the Conservatives won in 1983, while the new Newcastle North became a safe Labour seat, although in 1983 Labour's majority was just over 2,500 votes in a relatively close three-way race, despite a landslide defeat on the national scale. It has been a safe Labour seat ever since, with the Liberal Democrats being the greatest challengers in 2005 and 2010, and the Conservatives finishing in second place in 2015, 2017 and 2019.

== Members of Parliament ==
Election	Member	Party
1918	Nicholas Grattan-Doyle	Conservative
1940 by-election	Sir Cuthbert Headlam	Independent Conservative
1940	Sir Cuthbert Headlam	Conservative
1951	Gwilym Lloyd George	National Liberal
1957 by-election	Sir William Elliott	Conservative
1983	Robert Brown	Labour
1987	Doug Henderson	Labour
2010	Catherine McKinnell	Labour

== Elections ==
=== Elections in the 2020s ===
General election 2024: Newcastle upon Tyne North
Party	Candidate	Votes	%	±%
Labour	Catherine McKinnell	24,440	50.3	+5.9
Conservative	Guy Renner-Thompson	6,678	13.7	−18.1
Liberal Democrats	Aidan King	5,936	12.2	−1.8
Reform	Deborah Lorraine	5,933	12.2	+6.4
Green	Sarah Peters	5,035	10.4	+6.3
Independent	King Teare	310	0.6	N/A
SDP	Martin Evison	285	0.6	N/A
Majority		17,762	36.6	+24.4
Turnout		48,617	64.7	−6.1
Labour hold		Swing	+12.0	

=== Elections in the 2010s ===
2019 notional result (new boundaries)
Party	Vote	%
Labour	24,030	44.4
Conservative	17,207	31.8
Liberal Democrats	7,595	14.0
Brexit	3,118	5.8
Green	2,193	4.1
Turnout	54,143	70.8
Electorate	76,503	

General election 2019: Newcastle upon Tyne North
Party	Candidate	Votes	%	±%
Labour	Catherine McKinnell	21,354	45.4	▼10.0
Conservative	Mark Lehain	15,589	33.2	▼0.7
Liberal Democrats	Nick Cott	4,357	9.3	▲4.0
Brexit Party	Richard Ogden	4,331	9.2	N/A
Green	Alistair Ford	1,368	2.9	▲1.8
Majority		5,765	12.2	▼9.3
Turnout		46,999	68.6	▼3.8
Labour hold		Swing	▼4.6	

General election 2017: Newcastle upon Tyne North
Party	Candidate	Votes	%	±%
Labour	Catherine McKinnell	26,729	55.4	▲9.3
Conservative	Duncan Crute	16,380	33.9	▲10.5
Liberal Democrats	Anita Lower	2,533	5.2	▼4.5
UKIP	Timothy Marron	1,780	3.6	▼12.9
Green	Alison Whalley	513	1.0	▼2.3
North of England Community Alliance	Brian Moore	353	0.8	N/A
Majority		10,349	21.5	▼1.1
Turnout		48,288	72.4	▲5.7
Labour hold		Swing	▼0.6	

General election 2015: Newcastle upon Tyne North
Party	Candidate	Votes	%	±%
Labour	Catherine McKinnell	20,689	46.1	▲5.2
Conservative	Stephen Bates	10,536	23.5	▲5.3
UKIP	Timothy Marron	7,447	16.6	▲13.7
Liberal Democrats	Anita Lower	4,366	9.7	▼23.4
Green	Alison Whalley	1,515	3.4	▲2.6
North East	Violet Rook	338	0.7	N/A
Majority		10,153	22.6	▲14.9
Turnout		44,891	66.7	▲1.2
Labour hold		Swing	▼0.05	

General election 2010: Newcastle upon Tyne North
Party	Candidate	Votes	%	±%
Labour	Catherine McKinnell	17,950	40.8	−9.0
Liberal Democrats	Ronald Beadle	14,536	33.1	+0.1
Conservative	Stephen Parkinson	7,966	18.1	+3.4
BNP	Terry Gibson	1,890	4.3	+4.3
UKIP	Ian Proud	1,285	2.9	+2.9
Green	Anna Heyman	319	0.7	+0.7
Majority		3,414	7.8	−9.5
Turnout		43,946	65.5	+3.8
Labour hold		Swing	−4.5	

=== Elections in the 2000s ===
General election 2005: Newcastle upon Tyne North
Party	Candidate	Votes	%	±%
Labour	Doug Henderson	19,224	50.0	−10.1
Liberal Democrats	Ronald Beadle	12,201	31.7	+12.3
Conservative	Neil Hudson	6,022	15.7	−4.7
National Front	Roland Wood	997	2.6	New
Majority		7,023	18.3	−21.4
Turnout		38,444	67.6	+10.1
Labour hold		Swing	−11.2	

General election 2001: Newcastle upon Tyne North
Party	Candidate	Votes	%	±%
Labour	Doug Henderson	21,874	60.1	−2.1
Conservative	Philip R. Smith	7,424	20.4	+1.0
Liberal Democrats	Graham A. Soult	7,070	19.4	+4.9
Majority		14,450	39.7	−3.1
Turnout		36,368	57.5	−11.7
Labour hold		Swing	-0.5	

=== Elections in the 1990s ===
General election 1997: Newcastle upon Tyne North
Party	Candidate	Votes	%	±%
Labour	Doug Henderson	28,125	62.2	+12.8
Conservative	Gregory B. White	8,793	19.4	−12.4
Liberal Democrats	Peter J. Allen	6,578	14.5	−4.3
Referendum	Doreen Chipchase	1,733	3.8	New
Majority		19,332	42.8	+25.2
Turnout		45,229	69.2	−7.6
Labour hold		Swing	+12.6	

General election 1992: Newcastle upon Tyne North
Party	Candidate	Votes	%	±%
Labour	Doug Henderson	25,121	49.4	+6.7
Conservative	Ian Gordon	16,175	31.8	+7.2
Liberal Democrats	Peter J. Maughan	9,542	18.8	−13.9
Majority		8,946	17.6	+7.6
Turnout		50,838	76.8	+0.9
Labour hold		Swing	−0.3	

=== Elections in the 1980s ===
General election 1987: Newcastle upon Tyne North
Party	Candidate	Votes	%	±%
Labour	Doug Henderson	22,424	42.7	+5.1
Liberal	John Shipley	17,181	32.7	+2.8
Conservative	John Tweddle	12,915	24.6	−7.9
Majority		5,243	10.0	+4.9
Turnout		52,520	75.9	+3.1
Labour hold		Swing		

The 1983 result is classed as a hold for Labour, rather than a gain from the Conservatives, because the pre-1983 Newcastle-upon-Tyne North constituency, which was a Conservative-held seat, covered a substantially different area, making the two seats entirely different. The constituency which replaced the pre-1983 Newcastle-upon-Tyne North constituency, Newcastle-upon-Tyne Central, was won by the Conservatives and is classed as a hold for the Conservatives, as they were incumbent party in the pre-1983 Newcastle-upon-Tyne North seat. By contrast, this constituency was the closest successor to the pre-1983 Newcastle-upon-Tyne West seat where Robert Brown had been the MP.

General election 1983: Newcastle upon Tyne North
Party	Candidate	Votes	%	±%
Labour	Robert Brown	18,985	37.6	−10.8
Conservative	Philip Straw	16,429	32.5	−5.1
Liberal	John Shipley	15,136	29.9	+16.2
Majority		2,556	5.1	
Turnout		50,550	72.8	
Labour hold		Swing		

=== Elections in the 1970s ===
General election 1979: Newcastle upon Tyne North
Party	Candidate	Votes	%	±%
Conservative	William Elliott	12,721	47.6	+4.7
Labour	S. Ward	11,010	41.2	+0.1
Liberal	C. Marlowe	2,983	11.2	−4.8
Majority		1,711	6.4	+4.6
Turnout		26,714	68.0	+3.0
Conservative hold		Swing		

General election October 1974: Newcastle upon Tyne North
Party	Candidate	Votes	%	±%
Conservative	William Elliott	11,217	42.9	−0.7
Labour	Tony Banks	10,748	41.1	+7.7
Liberal	David Herd	4,189	16.0	−7.1
Majority		469	1.8	−8.3
Turnout		26,154	65.0	−8.4
Conservative hold		Swing		

General election February 1974: Newcastle upon Tyne North
Party	Candidate	Votes	%	±%
Conservative	William Elliott	12,793	43.6	−12.5
Labour	R.G. Eccles	9,813	33.4	−10.5
Liberal	Chris Foote Wood	6,772	23.1	New
Majority		2,980	10.2	−1.9
Turnout		29,378	73.4	+5.7
Conservative hold		Swing		

General election 1970: Newcastle upon Tyne North
Party	Candidate	Votes	%	±%
Conservative	William Elliott	15,978	56.1	+6.4
Labour	Robert George Eccles	12,518	43.9	+3.0
Majority		3,460	12.1	+3.3
Turnout		28,496	67.7	−7.4
Conservative hold		Swing		

=== Elections in the 1960s ===
General election 1966: Newcastle upon Tyne North
Party	Candidate	Votes	%	±%
Conservative	William Elliott	15,243	49.7	−11.2
Labour	Robert Griffin	12,550	40.9	+1.8
Liberal	Alan Share	2,902	9.5	New
Majority		2,693	8.8	−13.0
Turnout		30,695	75.1	−0.5
Conservative hold		Swing	-6.5	

General election 1964: Newcastle upon Tyne North
Party	Candidate	Votes	%	±%
Conservative	William Elliott	19,502	60.9	−4.0
Labour	Sidney Lee	12,515	39.1	+4.0
Majority		6,987	21.8	−7.9
Turnout		32,017	75.6	−3.5
Conservative hold		Swing		

=== Elections in the 1950s ===
General election 1959: Newcastle upon Tyne North
Party	Candidate	Votes	%	±%
Conservative	William Elliott	24,588	64.9	+1.1
Labour	Muriel Lloyd Prichard	13,316	35.1	−1.1
Majority		11,272	29.7	+2.0
Turnout		37,904	79.1	
Conservative hold		Swing		

Newcastle upon Tyne North by-election, 21 March 1957
Party	Candidate	Votes	%	±%
Conservative	William Elliott	19,107	60.35	−3.5
Labour	T. McDonald	12,555	39.65	+3.4
Majority		6,462	20.7	−7.0
Turnout		31,662		
Conservative hold		Swing		

General election 1955: Newcastle-upon-Tyne North
Party	Candidate	Votes	%	±%
National Liberal	Gwilym Lloyd-George	25,236	63.8	+12.7
Labour	Basil Chisholm	14,303	36.2	−0.1
Majority		10,933	27.7	+12.9
Turnout		39,539		
National Liberal hold		Swing		

The local Conservative Party association split on the issue of supporting Gwilym Lloyd-George's candidature. A faction nominated Colin Gray.

General election 1951: Newcastle-upon-Tyne North
Party	Candidate	Votes	%	±%
National Liberal	Gwilym Lloyd-George	23,930	51.1	−2.8
Labour	Ivan Geffen	17,005	36.3	+0.4
Ind. Conservative	Colin Gray	5,904	12.6	New
Majority		6,925	14.8	−3.2
Turnout		46,839		
National Liberal hold		Swing		

General election 1950: Newcastle-upon-Tyne North
Party	Candidate	Votes	%	±%
Conservative	Cuthbert Headlam	25,325	53.9	+3.3
Labour	W. Henry Shackleton	16,860	35.9	+6.1
Liberal	Aubrey Herbert	4,839	10.3	−6.6
Majority		8,465	18.0	−2.8
Turnout		47,024	83.7	+10.5
Conservative hold		Swing	+4.7	

=== Elections in the 1940s ===
General election 1945: Newcastle-upon-Tyne North
Party	Candidate	Votes	%	±%
Conservative	Cuthbert Headlam	17,381	50.6	−26.4
Labour Co-op	W. Henry Shackleton	10,228	29.8	+6.7
Liberal	William McKeag	5,812	16.9	New
Common Wealth	Charles Ridsdale	904	2.6	New
Majority		7,153	20.8	−33.1
Turnout		34,325	73.2	+2.9
Conservative hold		Swing	-16.5	

Newcastle upon Tyne North by-election, 7 June 1940
Party	Candidate	Votes	%	±%
Ind. Conservative	Cuthbert Headlam	7,380	71.2	New
Conservative	Howard Grattan-Doyle	2,982	28.8	−48.2
Majority		4,398	42.4	N/A
Turnout		10,362	22.0	−48.3
Ind. Conservative gain from Conservative		Swing		

=== Elections in the 1930s ===
General election 1935: Newcastle-upon-Tyne North
Party	Candidate	Votes	%	±%
Conservative	Nicholas Grattan-Doyle	25,683	77.0	−6.9
Labour	E. Gilbert	7,693	23.1	+6.9
Majority		17,990	53.9	−14.9
Turnout		33,376	70.3	−6.5
Conservative hold		Swing	-6.9	

General election 1931: Newcastle-upon-Tyne North
Party	Candidate	Votes	%	±%
Conservative	Nicholas Grattan-Doyle	30,245	83.9	
Labour	R.J. Thomson	5,791	16.1	
Majority		24,454	67.9	
Turnout		36,036	76.8	
Conservative hold		Swing		

=== Elections in the 1920s ===
General election 1929: Newcastle-upon-Tyne North
Party	Candidate	Votes	%	±%
Unionist	Nicholas Grattan-Doyle	17,962	55.4	−17.1
Labour	Edward Scott	7,573	23.4	−4.1
Liberal	J. Roberts Creighton	6,860	21.2	New
Majority		10,389	32.0	−13.0
Turnout		32,395	70.9	−3.3
Registered electors		45,720		
Unionist hold		Swing	−6.5	

General election 1924: Newcastle-upon-Tyne North
Party	Candidate	Votes	%	±%
Unionist	Nicholas Grattan-Doyle	18,386	72.5	+20.4
Labour	H. Maw	6,991	27.5	+5.5
Majority		11,395	45.0	+18.8
Turnout		25,377	74.2	+0.6
Registered electors		34,209		
Unionist hold		Swing	+7.5	

General election 1923: Newcastle-upon-Tyne North
Party	Candidate	Votes	%	±%
Unionist	Nicholas Grattan-Doyle	12,715	52.1	−9.1
Liberal	Robert Wilfred Simpson	6,321	25.9	−7.0
Labour	John Beckett	5,374	22.0	New
Majority		6,394	26.2	−2.1
Turnout		24,410	73.6	−0.3
Registered electors		33,182		
Unionist hold		Swing	−1.1	

General election 1922: Newcastle-upon-Tyne North
Party	Candidate	Votes	%	±%
Unionist	Nicholas Grattan-Doyle	14,931	61.2	+0.7
Liberal	Robert Wilfred Simpson	8,017	32.9	+9.9
Independent Labour	Robert John Wilson	1,435	5.9	New
Majority		6,914	28.3	−9.2
Turnout		24,383	73.9	+15.7
Registered electors		32,987		
Unionist hold		Swing	−4.6	

=== Election in the 1910s ===
General election 1918: Newcastle-upon-Tyne North
Party		Candidate	Votes	%	±%
C	Unionist	Nicholas Grattan-Doyle	11,347	60.5	
	Liberal	George Lunn	4,322	23.0	
	Labour	Robert John Wilson	3,102	16.5	
Majority			7,025	37.5	
Turnout			18,771	58.2	
Registered electors			32,272		
	Unionist win (new seat)				
C indicates candidate endorsed by the coalition government.

== See also ==
- 1940 Newcastle upon Tyne North by-election
- 1957 Newcastle upon Tyne North by-election
- List of parliamentary constituencies in Tyne and Wear
- List of parliamentary constituencies in North East England (region)
- History of parliamentary constituencies and boundaries in Tyne and Wear
- History of parliamentary constituencies and boundaries in Northumberland

== Sources ==
- Craig, F. W. S. (1983) [1969]. British parliamentary election results 1918-1949 (3rd ed.). Chichester: Parliamentary Research Services. ISBN 0-900178-06-X.
