= Newcastle upon Tyne West =

Parliamentary constituency in the United Kingdom, 1918–1983

- Former borough constituency for the House of Commons

1918–1983
- Seats: One
- Created from: Newcastle upon Tyne
- Replaced by: Newcastle-upon-Tyne North, Newcastle-upon-Tyne Central and Tyne Bridge

Newcastle upon Tyne West was a parliamentary constituency in the city of Newcastle upon Tyne from 1918 to 1983 which returned one Member of Parliament (MP) to the House of Commons of the Parliament of the United Kingdom.

== History ==
Parliament created this constituency in the Representation of the People Act 1918 as one of four divisions of the parliamentary borough of Newcastle-upon-Tyne, which had previously been represented by one two-member seat. It was abolished for the 1983 general election, when the closest successor constituency was Newcastle-upon-Tyne North.

== Boundaries ==
=== 1918–1950 ===
- The County Borough of Newcastle upon Tyne wards of Armstrong, Arthur's Hill, Benwell, Elswick, and Fenham.

Included the former Urban District of Benwell and Fenham which had been absorbed into the County Borough in 1904 and had previously been part of the abolished Tyneside constituency.

=== 1950–1955 ===
- the County Borough of Newcastle upon Tyne wards of Benwell, Fenham, Kenton, and Scotswood; and
- the Urban District of Newburn.

Boundaries redrawn to take account of expansion of the County Borough and redistribution of wards. Armstrong transferred to Newcastle upon Tyne Central and Arthur's Hill and Elswick to Newcastle upon Tyne North. Gained Newburn from the abolished constituency of Wansbeck.

=== 1955–1983 ===
- the County Borough of Newcastle upon Tyne wards of Fenham, Kenton, and Scotswood; and
- the Urban District of Newburn.

Benham ward transferred to Newcastle upon Tyne Central.

=== Abolition ===
Following the reorganisation of local authorities as a result of the Local Government Act 1972, the constituencies within the City of Newcastle upon Tyne were completely redrawn and the constituency was abolished. About half the electorate, comprising the former Urban District of Newburn was included in a newly constituted Newcastle upon Tyne North. Fenham and Kenton were transferred to Newcastle upon Tyne Central and Scotswood to the new constituency of Tyne Bridge.

== Members of Parliament ==
| Election | Member | Party |
|---|---|---|
| 1918 | Edward Shortt | Coalition Liberal |
| 1922 | Edward Shortt | National Liberal |
| 1922 | David Adams | Labour |
| 1923 | Cecil Beresford Ramage | Liberal |
| 1924 | John Palin | Labour |
| 1931 | Sir Joseph Leech | Conservative |
| 1940 by-election | William Nunn | Conservative |
| 1945 | Ernest Popplewell | Labour |
| 1966 | Robert Brown | Labour |
| 1983 | constituency abolished | |

== Election results ==
=== Elections in the 1910s ===
Edward Shortt

General election 1918: Newcastle upon Tyne West
| Party | | Candidate | Votes | % |
|---|---|---|---|---|
| C | Coalition Liberal | Edward Shortt | 12,812 | 66.6 |
| | Labour | David Adams | 6,411 | 33.4 |
| Majority | | | 6,401 | 33.2 |
| Turnout | | | 19,223 | 57.3 |
| Registered electors | | | 33,527 | |
| | National Liberal win (new seat) | | | |
C indicates candidate endorsed by the coalition government.

=== Elections in the 1920s ===
Denman

General election 1922: Newcastle upon Tyne West
| Party | Candidate | Votes | % | ±% |
|---|---|---|---|---|
| Labour | David Adams | 11,654 | 43.9 | +10.5 |
| National Liberal | Cecil Beresford Ramage | 11,499 | 43.4 | −23.2 |
| Liberal | Richard Denman | 3,367 | 12.7 | −53.9 |
| Majority | | 156 | 0.5 | N/A |
| Turnout | | 26,520 | 80.5 | +23.2 |
| Registered electors | | 32,964 | | |
| Labour gain from National Liberal | | Swing | +32.2 | |

General election 1923: Newcastle upon Tyne West
| Party | Candidate | Votes | % | ±% |
|---|---|---|---|---|
| Liberal | Cecil Beresford Ramage | 15,141 | 56.8 | +13.4 |
| Labour | David Adams | 11,527 | 43.2 | −0.7 |
| Majority | | 3,614 | 13.6 | N/A |
| Turnout | | 26,668 | 79.3 | −1.2 |
| Registered electors | | 33,621 | | |
| Liberal gain from Labour | | Swing | +7.1 | |

General election 1924: Newcastle upon Tyne West
| Party | Candidate | Votes | % | ±% |
|---|---|---|---|---|
| Labour | John Palin | 13,089 | 45.5 | +2.3 |
| Unionist | Clifford Vernon | 8,459 | 29.4 | New |
| Liberal | Cecil Beresford Ramage | 7,208 | 25.1 | −31.7 |
| Majority | | 4,630 | 16.1 | N/A |
| Turnout | | 28,756 | 83.8 | +4.5 |
| Registered electors | | 34,304 | | |
| Labour gain from Liberal | | Swing | +17.0 | |

General election 1929: Newcastle upon Tyne West
| Party | Candidate | Votes | % | ±% |
|---|---|---|---|---|
| Labour | John Palin | 16,856 | 46.6 | +1.1 |
| Unionist | Joseph Leech | 14,088 | 38.9 | +9.5 |
| Liberal | John Dodd | 5,267 | 14.5 | −10.6 |
| Majority | | 2,768 | 7.7 | −8.4 |
| Turnout | | 36,211 | 76.8 | −7.0 |
| Registered electors | | 47,121 | | |
| Labour hold | | Swing | −4.2 | |

=== Elections in the 1930s ===
General election 1931: Newcastle upon Tyne West
| Party | Candidate | Votes | % | ±% |
|---|---|---|---|---|
| Conservative | Joseph Leech | 28,560 | 67.88 | +19.0 |
| Labour | John Palin | 13,514 | 32.12 | −14.5 |
| Majority | | 15,046 | 35.76 | N/A |
| Turnout | | 42,074 | 83.28 | +6.5 |
| Registered electors | | 50,521 | | |
| Conservative gain from Labour | | Swing | +16.75 | |

General election 1935: Newcastle upon Tyne West
| Party | Candidate | Votes | % | ±% |
|---|---|---|---|---|
| Conservative | Joseph Leech | 25,526 | 59.95 | −7.93 |
| Labour | William Taylor | 17,052 | 40.05 | +7.93 |
| Majority | | 8,474 | 19.90 | −15.86 |
| Turnout | | 42,578 | 75.05 | −8.23 |
| Registered electors | | 56,732 | | |
| Conservative hold | | Swing | -7.93 | |

=== Elections in the 1940s ===
General Election 1939–40: Another General Election was required to take place before the end of 1940. The political parties had been making preparations for an election to take place from 1939 and by the end of this year, the following candidates had been selected;

- Conservative: Joseph Leech
- Labour: Henry Hird

At the outbreak of the Second World War the planned election was postponed and the major parties agreed to an electoral truce, where they would not contest by-elections against each other for the duration of the war. This meant that following Joseph Leech's death in May 1940 neither Labour nor the Liberal Party stood candidates, and the Conservative candidate was unopposed.

1940 Newcastle upon Tyne West by-election
| Party | Candidate | Votes | % | ±% |
|---|---|---|---|---|
| Conservative | William Nunn | Unopposed | | |
| Conservative hold | | | | |

General election 1945: Newcastle upon Tyne West
| Party | Candidate | Votes | % | ±% |
|---|---|---|---|---|
| Labour | Ernest Popplewell | 28,149 | 58.50 | +18.45 |
| Conservative | William Nunn | 19,966 | 41.50 | −18.45 |
| Majority | | 8,183 | 17.00 | N/A |
| Turnout | | 48,115 | 72.94 | −2.11 |
| Registered electors | | 65,964 | | |
| Labour gain from Conservative | | Swing | +18.45 | |

=== Elections in the 1950s ===
General election 1950: Newcastle upon Tyne West
| Party | Candidate | Votes | % | ±% |
|---|---|---|---|---|
| Labour | Ernest Popplewell | 31,230 | 58.19 | −0.31 |
| Conservative | AE Pain | 21,949 | 40.90 | −0.60 |
| Communist | R McNair | 492 | 0.92 | New |
| Majority | | 9,281 | 17.29 | +0.28 |
| Turnout | | 53,671 | 87.19 | +14.25 |
| Registered electors | | 61,556 | | |
| Labour hold | | Swing | +0.15 | |

General election 1951: Newcastle upon Tyne West
| Party | Candidate | Votes | % | ±% |
|---|---|---|---|---|
| Labour | Ernest Popplewell | 31,765 | 57.92 | −0.27 |
| Conservative | James Michael Bazin | 23,081 | 42.08 | +1.18 |
| Majority | | 8,684 | 15.84 | −1.45 |
| Turnout | | 54,846 | 87.17 | −0.02 |
| Registered electors | | 62,916 | | |
| Labour hold | | Swing | -0.73 | |

General election 1955: Newcastle upon Tyne West
| Party | Candidate | Votes | % | ±% |
|---|---|---|---|---|
| Labour | Ernest Popplewell | 25,401 | 55.68 | −2.24 |
| Conservative | Arthur Grey | 20,217 | 44.32 | +2.24 |
| Majority | | 5,184 | 11.36 | −4.47 |
| Turnout | | 45,618 | 79.83 | −7.34 |
| Registered electors | | 57,142 | | |
| Labour hold | | Swing | -2.24 | |

General election 1959: Newcastle upon Tyne West
| Party | Candidate | Votes | % | ±% |
|---|---|---|---|---|
| Labour | Ernest Popplewell | 28,956 | 54.75 | −0.93 |
| Conservative | C Dennis Larrow | 23,933 | 45.25 | +0.93 |
| Majority | | 5,023 | 9.50 | −1.86 |
| Turnout | | 52,889 | 81.99 | +2.16 |
| Registered electors | | 64,509 | | |
| Labour hold | | Swing | -0.93 | |

=== Elections in the 1960s ===
General election 1964: Newcastle upon Tyne West
| Party | Candidate | Votes | % | ±% |
|---|---|---|---|---|
| Labour | Ernest Popplewell | 29,603 | 58.33 | +3.58 |
| Conservative | H Ian Bransom | 21,149 | 41.67 | −3.58 |
| Majority | | 8,454 | 16.66 | +7.16 |
| Turnout | | 50,752 | 79.37 | −2.62 |
| Registered electors | | 63,943 | | |
| Labour hold | | Swing | +3.58 | |

General election 1966: Newcastle upon Tyne West
| Party | Candidate | Votes | % | ±% |
|---|---|---|---|---|
| Labour | Robert Brown | 30,219 | 62.67 | +4.34 |
| Conservative | Denis Alan Orde | 18,002 | 37.33 | −4.34 |
| Majority | | 12,217 | 25.34 | +8.68 |
| Turnout | | 48,221 | 75.79 | −3.58 |
| Registered electors | | 63,628 | | |
| Labour hold | | Swing | +4.34 | |

=== Elections in the 1970s ===
General election 1970: Newcastle upon Tyne West
| Party | Candidate | Votes | % | ±% |
|---|---|---|---|---|
| Labour | Robert Brown | 30,805 | 58.73 | |
| Conservative | C Lipman | 21,644 | 41.27 | |
| Majority | | 9,161 | 17.46 | |
| Turnout | | 52,449 | 70.62 | |
| Labour hold | | Swing | | |

General election February 1974: Newcastle upon Tyne West
| Party | Candidate | Votes | % | ±% |
|---|---|---|---|---|
| Labour | Robert Brown | 33,829 | 60.13 | +1.4 |
| Conservative | Robin Milton Stewart | 22,433 | 39.87 | −1.4 |
| Majority | | 11,396 | 20.2 | +2.7 |
| Turnout | | 56,262 | 73.8 | +3.2 |
| Labour hold | | Swing | | |

General election October 1974: Newcastle upon Tyne West
| Party | Candidate | Votes | % | ±% |
|---|---|---|---|---|
| Labour | Robert Brown | 30,057 | 56.73 | −3.4 |
| Conservative | Robin Milton Stewart | 14,983 | 28.28 | −11.6 |
| Liberal | Robert Humphrey Bourchier Devereux | 7,945 | 15.0 | New |
| Majority | | 15,074 | 28.5 | +8.2 |
| Turnout | | 52,985 | 68.9 | −4.9 |
| Labour hold | | Swing | +4.1 | |

General election 1979: Newcastle upon Tyne West
| Party | Candidate | Votes | % | ±% |
|---|---|---|---|---|
| Labour | Robert Brown | 32,827 | 54.51 | −2.2 |
| Conservative | Donald David Gilbert | 21,591 | 35.85 | +7.5 |
| Liberal | Jane Dryden Dickinson | 5,801 | 9.63 | −5.4 |
| Majority | | 11,236 | 18.66 | −9.8 |
| Turnout | | 60,219 | 72.4 | +3.5 |
| Labour hold | | Swing | −4.9 | |

== See also ==
- History of parliamentary constituencies and boundaries in Northumberland

== Sources ==
- Craig, F. W. S. (1983) [1969]. British parliamentary election results 1918-1949 (3rd ed.). Chichester: Parliamentary Research Services. ISBN 0-900178-06-X.
- Leigh Rayment's Historical List of MPs – Constituencies beginning with "N" (part 1)
