= William Elliott, Baron Elliott of Morpeth =

British politician (1920–2011)

The Right Honourable The Lord Elliott of Morpeth DL

Member of the House of Lords
- Lord Temporal
- Life peerage 16 May 1985 – 20 May 2011

Personal details
- Born: 11 December 1920
- Died: 20 May 2011 (aged 90)

Robert William Elliott, Baron Elliott of Morpeth, Kt. DL (11 December 1920 – 20 May 2011) was a British Conservative politician.

The son of Richard Elliott, was a former councillor and mayor of Morpeth, William Elliott was the Conservative Party candidate in the 1954 Morpeth by-election and again for the same constituency in the 1955 General Election, losing on both occasions by over 14,000 votes to the Labour candidate.

He was elected as Member of Parliament for Newcastle upon Tyne North at a by-election in 1957, and held the seat until his retirement at the 1983 general election.

From 1958 Elliott was a Parliamentary Private Secretary (PPS), serving until 1964, when he was appointed an opposition whip, and became a government whip when the Conservatives regained power in 1970.

Elliott was a Vice-Chairman of Conservative Party from 1970 to 1974. He was knighted in 1974, and became a Deputy Lieutenant of Northumberland in 1982.

On 16 May 1985, he was created a life peer as Baron Elliott of Morpeth, of Morpeth in the County of Northumberland and of the City of Newcastle upon Tyne and took his seat in the House of Lords, where he was Deputy Speaker from 1992 to 2002 and Deputy Chair of Committees from 1997 to 2002.

== Arms ==
Coat of arms of William Elliott, Baron Elliott of Morpeth
Crest Upon a mount Vert in front of an oak tree Proper fructed Or a fountain ensigned by a crown flory Azure. Escutcheon Gules on a bend Or cotised dancetty Argent bendwise in chief a triple-towered castle Gules masoned Argent the portal Azure with portcullis down Gold. Supporters Dexter a stag Proper attired and unguled Gold sinister a seahorse erect Argent scaled Gold. Compartment Three grassy mounts Proper with between that in the centre and those on either side water barry wavy of four Argent and Azure. Motto Imprimis Honor

== Sources ==
- Leigh Rayment's Peerage Pages
- Leigh Rayment's Historical List of MPs

Parliament of the United Kingdom
Preceded by Gwilym Lloyd-George	Member of Parliament for Newcastle upon Tyne North; 1957–1983	Succeeded by Robert Brown
