= Tameside Radio =

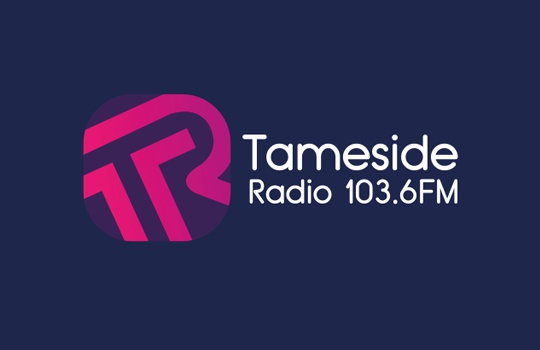
- Ashton-under-Lyne; England
- Broadcast area: Tameside
- Frequency: 103.6 FM

Programming
- Format: Adult contemporary

Ownership
- Owner: Not Really Here Group

History
- First air date: 30 September 2007

Links
- Website: www.questmedianetwork.co.uk/on-air/

Tameside Radio is a radio station which broadcasts to the Tameside area of Greater Manchester. The station is based in Ashton-under-Lyne and broadcasts on 103.6 FM from its transmitter at Harrop Edge in Mottram.

== History ==
Tameside Radio launched on 30 September 2007 and was acquired by social landlord New Charter Housing Trust in 2011, but owned by the independent company as Quest Media Network.

In 2017, it was granted a license extension from Ofcom to continue broadcasting until September 2022.

In January 2019, local businessman Chris Bird took over as Executive Chairman of Quest Media Network.

In 2024 Tameside Radio, along with the other local newspaper assets of Quest Media Network were acquired by a new company The Not Really Here Group.

== Programming ==
Weekday daytime programmes are presented by Mark Andrews, Martin Emery and Cameron Kennedy. The Evening Alternative is broadcast weekday evenings.

Weekend presenters include James HK, Dan & Mark, Tim Fernley, Paul Fairclough, Mike Wallbank, Rob Charles, Colin Hanslip, Peter Milburn and Alan. Steadman.

Tameside Radio broadcasts national and international news bulletins every hour, provided by Radio News hub. On weekdays, the station broadcasts local news updates in partnership with the Tameside Reporter newspaper.

== See also ==
- List of radio stations in the United Kingdom
