= Yorkshire Factory Times =

British newspaper

The Yorkshire Factory Times was a British newspaper, founded in 1889. It was published weekly between 3 January 1890 and 29 December 1899. The newspaper was initially edited by Joseph Burgess and published from Huddersfield. The Yorkshire Factory Times was sold at the price of one penny.

The Yorkshire Factory Times had started as an offshoot of the conservative Cotton Factory Times. Under Burgess' editorship the Yorkshire Factory Times moved towards socialist positions, arguing in favour of socialist New Unionism. Simultaneously, Burgess published the Workman's Times. There was some overlapping in articles between the two papers. In 1894 the editorial post was passed on to C. Allen Clarke, an Independent Labour Party member. William Henry Drew, one of the founders of this party, was a correspondent.

The Yorkshire Factory Times frequently carried serialized fictional novels in its pages. Examples of such serialized novels include Lancashire Lads and Lasses (which ran from November 1895 to February 1896) and The Knobstick, both authored by C. Allen Clarke. Through publishing serialized novels, the Yorkshire Factory Times made fictional literature available to workers (who would have problems buying the more expensive bound volumes of literature).

In the 1910s, the name was changed to Yorkshire Factory Times and Workers Weekly Record. From May 1918 onwards, the newspaper was published by the Labour Party politician Ben Turner as the organ of the textile workers union. Between November 1919 and June 1922, the newspaper was named Labour Pioneer. The name was changed back to The Yorkshire Factory Times and Workers Weekly Record in July 1922. The newspaper ceased publication in April 1926.
