= 1957 Newcastle-upon-Tyne North by-election =

UK Parliamentary by-election

The 1957 Newcastle-upon-Tyne North by-election of 21 March 1957 was held after the elevation to the Peerage of National Liberal and Conservative MP (MP) Gwilym Lloyd George.

The seat was safe, having been won by Lloyd George at the 1955 United Kingdom general election by nearly 11,000 votes

== Result of the previous general election ==
General election 1955: Newcastle-upon-Tyne North
Party	Candidate	Votes	%	±%
National Liberal	Gwilym Lloyd George	25,236	63.83	
Labour	Basil Chisholm	14,303	36.17	
Majority		10,933	27.66	
Turnout		39,539		
National Liberal hold		Swing		

== Result of the by-election ==
By-election 1957: Newcastle-upon-Tyne North
Party	Candidate	Votes	%	±%
Conservative	William Elliott	19,107	60.35	−3.48
Labour	T. McDonald	12,555	39.65	+3.48
Majority		6,462	20.70	−6.95
Turnout		31,662		
Conservative hold		Swing		
