= Cotton Factory Times =

British newspaper

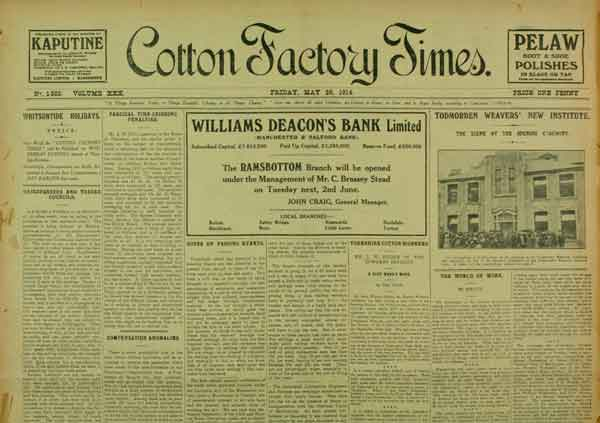
- Front cover of the Cotton Factory Times from 18 May 1914
- Type: Weekly newspaper
- Owner: Ashton Reporter group
- Founder: John Andrew
- Editor: Sam Taylor (to 1932); James Haslam (1932–1937)
- Founded: 1885
- Ceased publication: 1937
- City: Ashton-under-Lyne
- Country: United Kingdom
- Circulation: 53,000 (as of c.1900)
- Sister newspapers: Yorkshire Factory Times

The Cotton Factory Times was a weekly British newspaper, aimed at cotton mill workers in Lancashire and Cheshire.

The newspaper was established in 1885 by John Andrew, owner of the daily Ashton Evening Reporter and several related newspapers. He believed that, in order to sell newspapers to the large number of cotton mill workers in the area, he would have to create a newspaper which specifically targeted them, in particular by including extensive reporting on issues relating to the industry in which they worked.

In order to access news on the cotton industry, Andrew partnered with several well-known cotton trade unionists, including Thomas Ashton, Thomas Birtwistle and James Mawdsley. Of the eight-page newspaper, their reports filled the front page, and often one or more of the inside pages. The Oldham Operative Spinners' Association was a particular supporter of the newspaper, and in 1887 it invested £1,000 in the venture.

Andrew also built up a network of local correspondents to report on local events, in a section entitled "Voices from the Spindle and the Loom". The newspaper also included entertainment pages, featuring fiction in serial format, often written in Lancashire dialect, by writers including C. Allen Clarke. The paper was sold for 1d, and it soon achieved significant sales - by the early 1900s, it was claiming sales of 53,000 copies an issue.

By 1889, Andrew realised that the newspaper was not selling in the neighbouring county of Yorkshire, and in response to this, he launched the Yorkshire Factory Times. This was followed, in 1890, by the Workman's Times, which was aimed at workers in non-textile trades in Lancashire, Yorkshire and Cheshire. Both of these newspapers moved to support the Independent Labour Party in the early 1890s, and by 1907 both had been sold.

Sales of the newspaper fell from the mid-1900s. By 1910, it was selling 20,000 copies an issue, even as cotton trade union membership grew. Some efforts were made to reinvigorate the paper, adding a prize for the best joke, printed in a "Mirth in the Mill" section, and a cartoon drawn by Sam Fitton. At the start of World War I, it was reduced to six pages, and in 1918 down to four pages, in order to conserve paper. By this point, sales were below 10,000, but Sam Taylor, its long-term editor, resisted significant changes.

Edward Andrew, John's son, became proprietor of the newspaper following his father's death, in 1906, then his brother William succeeded in 1919. For many years, they avoided making changes, but when Taylor retired in 1932, William appointed James Haslam, with a remit to relaunch the paper. The paper was again increased to eight pages, and the layout updated, while Haslam attempted to make new connections with cotton trade union leaders. Circulation continued to fall, and by 1937, sales were below 2,500. That year, the paper was finally closed.
