= Joseph Leech =

Sir Joseph William Leech (1865 – 30 May 1940) was a Unionist Party (now Conservative Party) politician elected as the Member of Parliament for Newcastle upon Tyne West between 1931 and 1940.

The son of Isaac Leech and Sarah, Leech was christened on 7 May 1865 in Cleator, Cumberland. He was educated at Newcastle University before becoming consulting surgeon to the Royal Victoria Infirmary and Throat and Ear Hospital, Newcastle upon Tyne. He became president of the University of Durham Medical Graduates' Association and Newcastle Clinical Society, and a senior fellow of the Association of Surgeons of Great Britain. He was also a member of the Middle Temple, and held the rank of Major with the Royal Army Medical Corps. He also qualified as a barrister, became a member of Newcastle City Council in 1932, and was elected mayor in 1932.
