= Lister Mills =

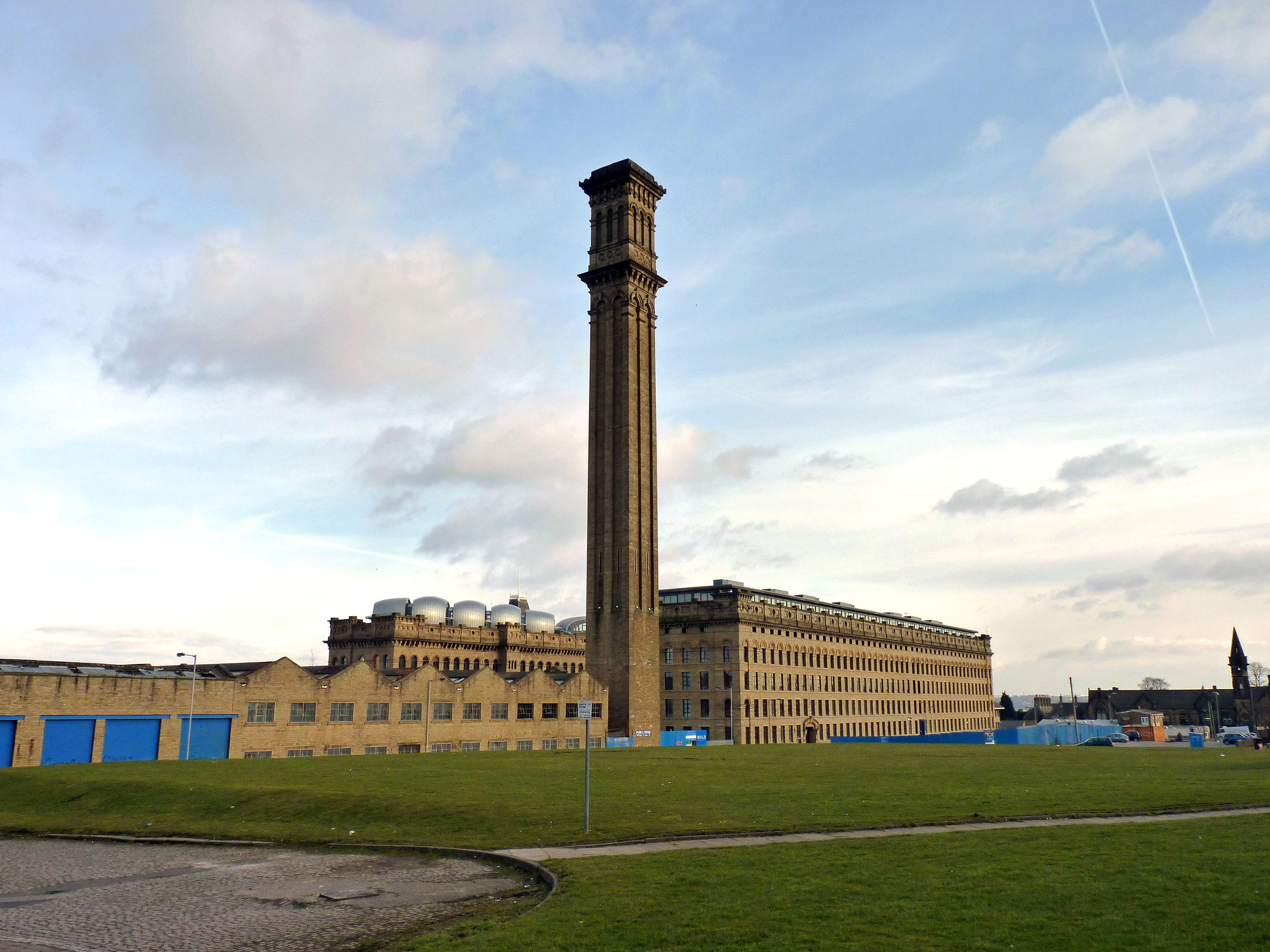
- Lister Mills in March 2010

- Location within West Yorkshire
- 53°48′33″N 1°46′45″W
- Type: Silk mill
- Location: Manningham
- OS grid reference: SE 14692 34722

History
- Built: 1873

Site notes
- Area: Bradford
- Architect(s): Andrews and Pepper
- Architectural style: Italianate

Listed Building – Grade II*
- Official name: Manningham Mills
- Designated: 14 June 1963; 9 August 1983
- Reference no.: 1314426

Lister Mills (otherwise known as Manningham Mills) was the largest silk factory in the world. It is located in the Manningham district of Bradford, West Yorkshire, England and was built by Samuel Cunliffe Lister to replace the original Manningham Mills which had been destroyed by fire in 1871. The mill is a Grade II* listed building, built in the Italianate style of Victorian architecture.

== History ==
On completion in 1873, Lister's was the largest textile mill in the north of England. Floor space in the mill amounts to 27 acres (11 ha), and its imposing shape remains a dominant feature of the Bradford skyline. The chimney of the mill is 249 feet (76 m) high, and can be seen from most areas of Bradford. It cost about £10,000 to build, and its total weight has been estimated at 8,000 long tons (8,100 t). Samuel Lister called it "Lister's Pride". Until the arrival of electric power in 1934, the mill was driven by steam engines. Every week the boilers consumed 1,000 tons of coal brought in on company rail wagons from the company collieries near Pontefract. Water was also vital in the process and the company had its own supply network including a large covered reservoir on-site (by 2006 that area had become a piazza and underground car park).

At its height, Lister's employed 11,000 men, women and children – manufacturing high-quality textiles such as velvet and silk. It supplied 1,000 yards (910 m) of velvet for King George V's coronation and in 1976 new velvet curtains for the President Ford White House. During the Second World War Lister's produced 1,330 miles (2,140 km) of real parachute silk, 284 miles (457 km) of flame-proof wool, 50 miles (80 km) of khaki battledress and 4,430 miles (7,130 km) of parachute cord.

A strike in 1890–91 at the mill was important in the establishment of the Independent Labour Party which later helped found the modern-day Labour Party.

== Decline and Rebirth ==
The Listers' business decreased considerably during the 1980s. Stiff foreign competition and changing textile trends such as increased use of artificial fibres were the reasons. In 1999, the mills were closed. Being a prominent structure, the mills attracted a great deal of attention and several regeneration proposals came and went. The sheer size of the buildings being a major difficulty.

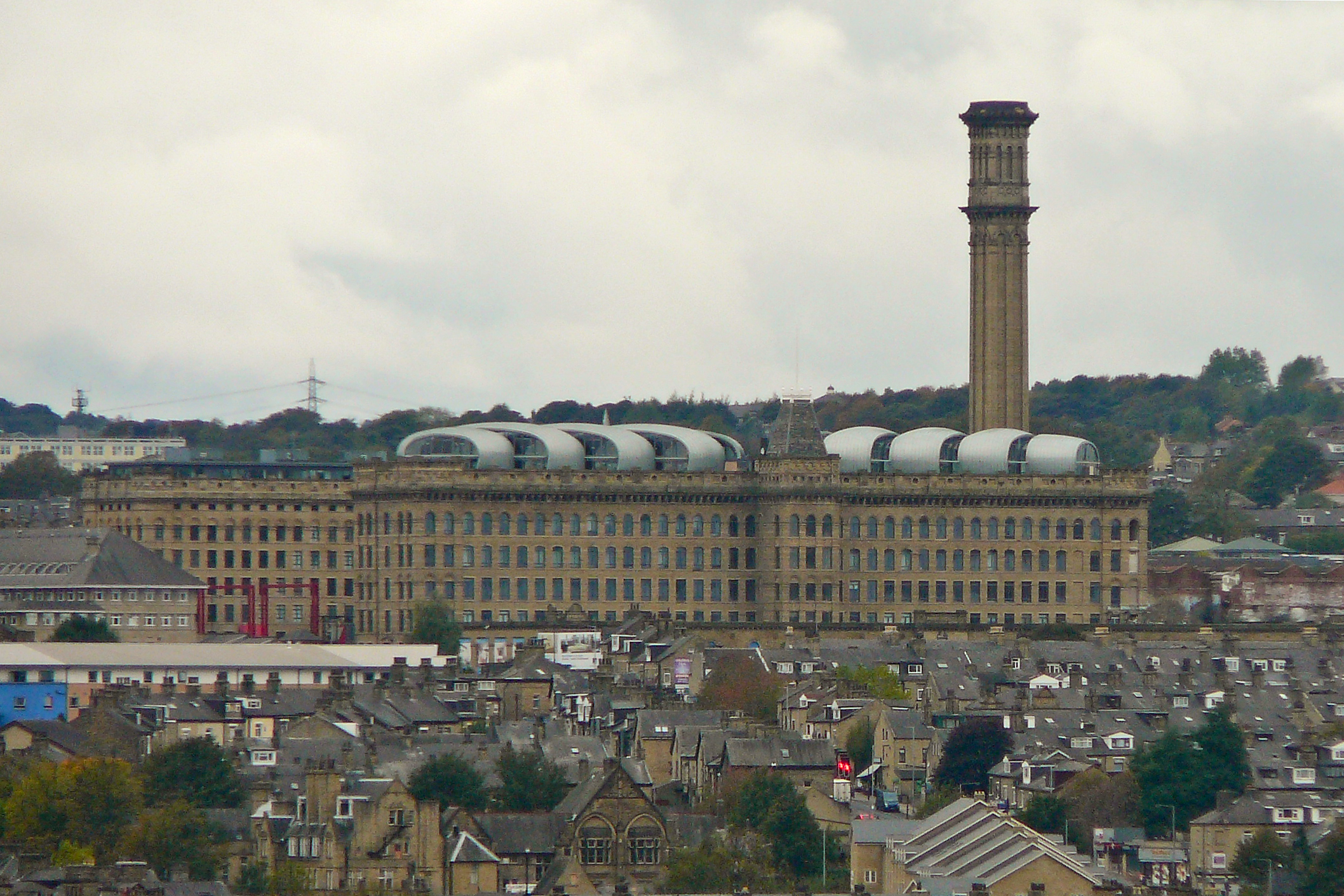
Lister Mills in 2010, from Lister Park

In 2000, property regeneration company Urban Splash bought Lister Mills from the administrators, Ernst and Young, with plans to renovate the silk warehouse. Costs for the project were estimated to be £100 million. Renovation work began in 2003, and construction formally began in September 2004. 131 new homes and 3 ground floor commercial units were subsequently completed in the large buildings. Construction was finished in 2006, but evidently left a majority of the site unmaintained.

The second phase was the regeneration of the largest building on the site, the velvet mill, by replacing the existing roof of the building with a glass and steel structure, housing two storey apartments and creating additional ground floor commercial spaces, whilst preserving original architectural features under the design of David Morley Architects. The new homes went on sale in early 2007.

== See also ==
- Grade II* listed buildings in Bradford
- Listed buildings in Bradford (Toller Ward)
- Bliss Tweed Mill
- Salts Mill
