= A1 road (Great Britain) =

Road in Great Britain

A1
- A1 A1(M)

Route information
- Part of E15
- Length: 410.00 mi (659.83 km)

Major junctions
- South end: A1211 in City of London
- M1 M25; A14; A47 M18 M62; M1; A64 A168; A66 A66(M) A194(M); A69; A19 A720
- North end: Edinburgh

Location
- Country: United Kingdom
- Primary destinations: London; Stevenage; Huntingdon; Peterborough; Stamford; Grantham; Newark-on-Trent; Worksop; Doncaster; Pontefract; Wetherby; Harrogate; Ripon; Scotch Corner; Darlington; Durham; Gateshead; Newcastle upon Tyne; Berwick-upon-Tweed; Edinburgh

Road network
- Roads in the United Kingdom; Motorways; A and B road zones

The A1, also known as the Great North Road, is the longest numbered road in the United Kingdom, at 410 miles (660 km). It connects London, the capital of England, with Edinburgh, the capital of Scotland. The numbering system for A-roads, devised in the early 1920s, was based around patterns of roads radiating from two hubs at London and Edinburgh. The first number in the system, A1, was given to the most important part of that system: the road from London to Edinburgh, joining the two central points of the system and linking two of the UK's mainland capital cities. It passes through or near north London, Hatfield, Stevenage, Baldock, Biggleswade, Peterborough, Stamford, Grantham, Newark-on-Trent, Retford, Doncaster, Pontefract, Leeds, York, Wetherby, Ripon, Darlington, Durham, Gateshead, Newcastle upon Tyne, Morpeth, Alnwick, Berwick-upon-Tweed, Dunbar, Haddington, Musselburgh, and east Edinburgh.

It was designated by the Ministry of Transport in 1921, and for much of its route it followed various branches of the historic Great North Road, the main deviation being between Boroughbridge and Darlington. The course of the A1 has changed where towns or villages have been bypassed, and where new alignments have taken a slightly different route. Between the North Circular Road in London and Morpeth in Northumberland, the road is a dual carriageway, several sections of which have been upgraded to motorway standard and designated A1(M). Between the M25 (near London) and the A720 (near Edinburgh) the road is part of the unsigned Euroroute E15 from Inverness to Algeciras.

== History ==
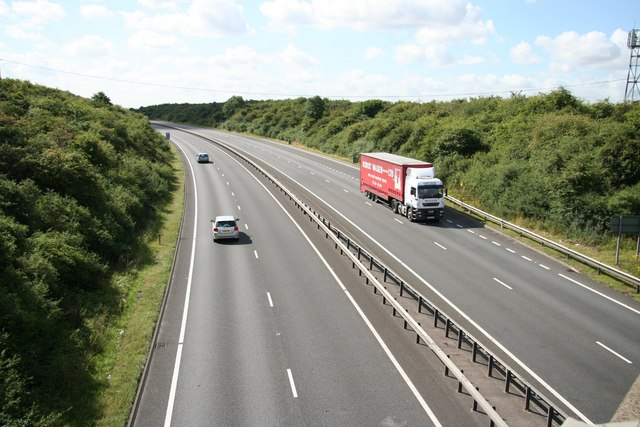
The A1 near Long Bennington, Lincolnshire

The A1 is the latest in a series of routes north from London to York and beyond. It was designated in 1921 by the Ministry of Transport under the Great Britain road numbering scheme. The earliest documented northern routes are the roads created by the Romans during the period from AD 43 to AD 410, which consisted of several itinera (plural of iter) recorded in the Antonine Itinerary. A combination of these were used by the Anglo-Saxons as the route from London to York, and together became known as Ermine Street. Ermine Street later became known as the Old North Road. Part of this route in London is followed by the current A10. By the 12th century, because of flooding and damage by traffic, an alternative route out of London was found through Muswell Hill, and became part of the Great North Road. A turnpike road, New North Road and Canonbury Road (A1200 road), was constructed in 1812 linking the start of the Old North Road around Shoreditch with the Great North Road at Highbury Corner. While the route of the A1 outside London mainly follows the Great North Road route used by mail coaches between London and Edinburgh, within London the coaching route is only followed through Islington.

The Ferryhill Cut was opened in 1923. A number of bypasses were built from 1926 onwards, including around Barnet and Hatfield in 1927, but it was not until c. 1954 that they were renumbered A1. The Chester-le-Street bypass, opened in 1931, was the first bypass to be built as a dual carriageway. In 1960 Stamford, Biggleswade and Doncaster were bypassed, as was Retford in 1961. Baldock, Eaton Socon and Buckden were bypassed in 1967. During the early 1970s plans to widen the A1 along Archway Road in London were abandoned after considerable opposition and four public inquiries during which road protesters disrupted proceedings. The scheme was finally dropped in 1990. The Hatfield cut-and-cover was opened in 1986.

A proposal to upgrade the whole of the A1 to motorway status was investigated by the government in 1989 but was dropped in 1995, along with many other schemes, in response to road protests against other road schemes (including the Newbury Bypass and the M3 extension through Twyford Down).

== Inns ==
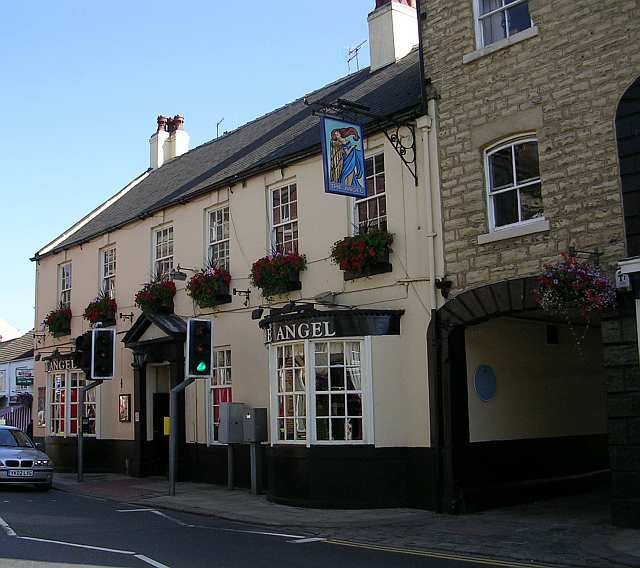
The Angel Inn at Wetherby is a coaching inn on the former A1, bypassed since the 1950s.

The inns on the road, many of which still survive, were staging posts on the coach routes, providing accommodation, stabling for the horses and replacement mounts. Few of the surviving coaching inns can be seen while driving on the A1, because the modern route now bypasses the towns with the inns.

== Route ==
The A1 runs from outside St Paul's tube station in the City of London near St. Paul's Cathedral to Edinburgh Waverley railway station in the centre of the Scottish capital. It shares its London terminus with the A40 and A1211 roads at the Museum of London Rotunda. It runs out of London via St. Martin's Le Grand and Aldersgate Street, through Islington (where Goswell Road and Upper Street form part of its route), up Holloway Road, through Highgate, Mill Hill, and Barnet where it has its last at-grade roundabout for 37 miles at Stirling Corner.

The road enters Hertfordshire just before Potters Bar, near the junction with the M25 at the South Mimms Services. The route here becomes the A1(M) and subsequently passes underneath Hatfield, and by Welwyn, Stevenage, and Baldock. But it once again becomes a dual carriageway with some at-grade junctions from Baldock Junction 10, past Biggleswade, Sandy and several small villages including the ‘Black Cat’ roundabout to Buckden, then on to Alconbury and the A1(M) at Junction 14. Junctions 11, 12 and 13 (for a motorway-standard road) may not be built until upgrading of the A1 here to a motorway is approved (possibly when the planned New Town at Tempsford is commenced).

Continuing north, the A1 runs on modern bypasses around Stamford, Grantham, Newark-on-Trent, Retford, Bawtry, Doncaster, Knottingley, Garforth, Wetherby, Knaresborough, Boroughbridge, Scotch Corner, Darlington, Newton Aycliffe, Durham and Chester-le-Street, past the Angel of the North sculpture and the Metrocentre in Gateshead, through the western suburbs of Newcastle upon Tyne, Morpeth, Alnwick, Berwick-upon-Tweed, into Scotland at Marshall Meadows, past Haddington and Musselburgh before arriving in Edinburgh at the East End of Princes Street near Waverley Station, at the junction of the A7, A8 and A900 roads.

Scotch Corner, in North Yorkshire, marks the point where, before the M6 was built, the traffic for Glasgow and the west of Scotland diverged from that for Edinburgh. As well as a hotel there have been a variety of sites for the transport café, now subsumed as a motorway services.

There are five roundabouts north of the Stirling corner junction in Barnet: Biggleswade south, Biggleswade north, Sandy A603, the ‘Black Cat’ A428/A4211, and lastly Buckden, after which there are no more roundabouts for 276 mi (444 km) until the Berwick A1167. The Black Cat roundabout is being redeveloped and is due to fully re-open in 2027.

== Overview and post-First World War developments ==
Most of the English section of the A1 is a series of alternating sections of primary route, dual carriageway and motorway. From Newcastle upon Tyne to Edinburgh it is a trunk road with alternating sections of dual and single carriageway. The table below summarises the road as motorway and non-motorway sections. Most of the non-motorway sections do not have junction numbers, with the exception of the Newcastle Western Bypass which continues the junction numbering of the A1(M).

Road name	Junctions	Length		Ceremonial counties (England) Council areas (Scotland)	Primary destinations
Road name	Junctions	miles	km	Ceremonial counties (England) Council areas (Scotland)	Primary destinations
A1		16.58	26.680	Greater London; Hertfordshire	London; Edgware, Barnet, Borehamwood
A1(M)	1–10	24.14	38.840	Hertfordshire	Hertford; Stevenage
A1		26.25	42.240	Hertfordshire, Bedfordshire; Cambridgeshire	Bedford, Cambridge, Huntingdon
A1(M)	13–17	12.84	20.66	Cambridgeshire	Peterborough
A1		72.99	117.44	Cambridgeshire, Rutland; Lincolnshire; Nottinghamshire	Stamford, Grantham; Newark on Trent
A1(M)	34–38	15.13	24.34	Nottinghamshire; South Yorkshire	Worksop, Blyth, Doncaster, Rotherham, Barnsley
A1		7.51	12.08	South Yorkshire; West Yorkshire	Pontefract, Castleford, Wakefield
A1(M)	40–65	93.27	150.10	West Yorkshire; North Yorkshire; County Durham; Tyne and Wear	Selby, Leeds, York, Wetherby, Harrogate, Thirsk, Ripon, Catterick, Richmond, Scotch Corner, Darlington, Teesside, Bishop Auckland, Durham, Chester-le-Street, Stanley, Beamish, Birtley, Washington (Sunderland), Gateshead
A1	65-80 (Newcastle Western Bypass only)	128.29	206.42	Tyne and Wear; Northumberland; Scottish Borders; East Lothian; Edinburgh	Gateshead, Blaydon, Newcastle-upon-Tyne, Cramlington, Morpeth, Alnwick, Belford, Lindisfarne, Berwick-upon-Tweed, Eyemouth, Dunbar, Haddington, Tranent, Prestonpans, Musselburgh, Edinburgh
		397.00	638.78		

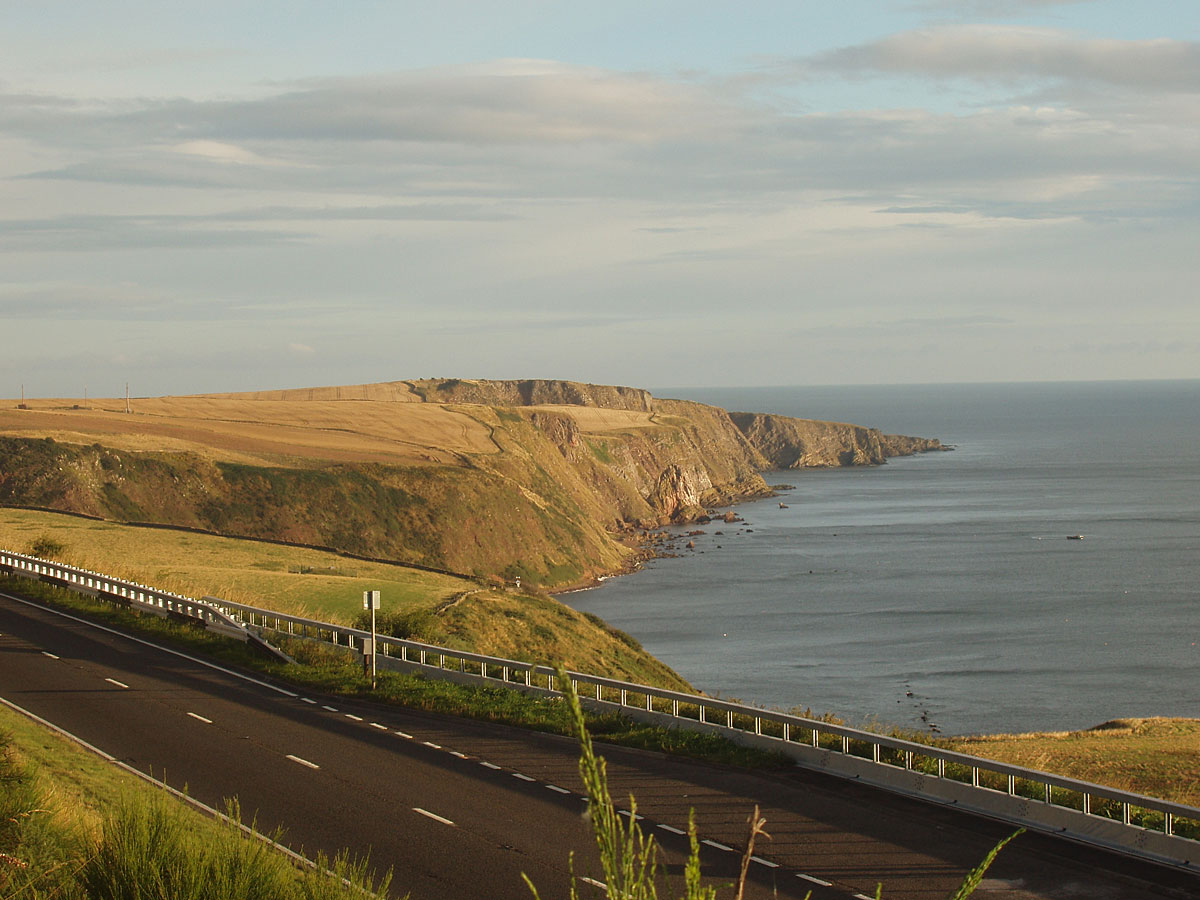
A single carriageway section of the A1 skirting the Scottish coastline just across the border from Northumberland.

A 13-mile (21 km) section of the road in North Yorkshire, from Walshford to Dishforth, was upgraded to motorway standard in 1995. Neolithic remains and a Roman fort were discovered.

A 13-mile (21 km) section of the road from Alconbury to Peterborough was upgraded to motorway standard at a cost of £128 million (£248 million as of 2025), which opened in 1998 requiring moving the memorial to Napoleonic prisoners buried at Norman Cross.

A number of sections between Newcastle and Edinburgh were dualled between 1999 and 2004, including a 1.9-mile (3 km) section from Spott Wood to Oswald Dean in 1999, 1.2-mile (2 km) sections from Bowerhouse to Spott Road and from Howburn to Houndwood in 2002–2003 and the 8.5-mile (13.7 km) "A1 Expressway", from Haddington and Dunbar in 2004. The total cost of these works was £50 million.

Plans to dual the single carriageway section of road north of Newcastle upon Tyne were shelved in 2006 as they were not considered a regional priority by central government. The intention was to dual the road between Morpeth and Felton and between Adderstone and Belford.

In 1999, a section of A1(M) between Bramham and Hook Moor opened to traffic along with the extension of the M1 from Leeds. Under a DBFO contract, sections from Wetherby to Walshford and Darrington to Hook Moor were opened in 2005 and 2006.

== Recent developments ==
=== A1 Peterborough to Blyth grade separated junctions ===
Between September 2006 and October 2009, six roundabouts on the A1 and the A1(M) to Alconbury were replaced with grade-separated junctions. These provide a fully grade-separated route between the Buckden roundabout (just north of St Neots and approximately 8 miles (13 km) north of the Black Cat roundabout) and just north of Morpeth. This project cost £96 million.

Section	Fully operational date
Blyth (A614)	May 2008
Apleyhead (A614/A57)	May 2008
Markham Moor (A57)	March 2009
Gonerby Moor (B1174)	June 2008
Colsterworth (A151) and the junction with the B6403	October 2009
Carpenters Lodge (Stamford) (B1081)	November 2008

=== A1(M) Bramham to Wetherby motorway ===
Upgrading the 6.2 miles (10 km) of road to dual three-lane motorway standard between the Bramham/A64 junction to north of Wetherby to meet the section of motorway at a cost of £70 million began in 2006, including a road alongside for non-motorway traffic. The scheme's public inquiry began on 18 October 2006 and the project was designed by James Poyner. Work began in May 2007, the motorway section opened in July 2009 and remaining work on side roads was still ongoing in late August and was expected to be completed by the end of 2009.

=== A1(M) Dishforth to Leeming motorway ===
Upgrading of the existing dual carriageway to dual three-lane motorway standard, with a local road alongside for non-motorway traffic, between Dishforth (A1(M)/A168 junction) and Leeming Bar, began in March 2009 and opened to traffic on or about the scheduled date of 31 March 2012.

=== A1(M) Leeming to Barton motorway ===
It had originally been proposed that the road would be upgraded to motorway from Dishforth to Barton (between Scotch Corner and Darlington), which was the start of current northernmost section of A1(M). In 2010 the section between Leeming and Barton was cancelled as part of government spending cuts but it was reinstated in December 2012. Work began on 3 April 2014 and was expected to be completed by Spring 2017, but only reached completion in March 2018 due in part to significant Roman-era archaeological finds along the route of the motorway. Completion has provided a continuous motorway-standard road between Darrington (south of M62 junction) and Washington, and given the North East and North Yorkshire full motorway access to London (via the M1 at Darrington and Hook Moor).

Councils in the north east have called for the section from Hook Moor in Yorkshire (where the M1 link road joins the A1(M)) to Washington to be renumbered as the M1. They maintain that this would raise the profile of the north-east and be good for business.

=== A1 (Gateshead Western Bypass) ===
In his Autumn Statement on 5 December 2012, the Chancellor of the Exchequer announced that the Government would upgrade a section of road from two to three lanes in each direction within the highway boundary at Lobley Hill (between Coal House and the Metro Centre), Gateshead at a cost of £64 million and create parallel link roads between the Lobley Hill and Gateshead Quay junctions. The same Road investment strategy announcement said that the remaining section of road between Birtley and Coal House will also be widened to three lanes each way, alongside the replacement of the Allerdene Bridge. A modified scheme commenced in August 2014 and was open to traffic in June 2016. The road is now three lanes each way with lane 3 narrower than lanes 1 and 2 so that all existing bridges remained as originally built.

The A1 around Durham, Gateshead and Newcastle has seen a number of incarnations, following routes through, to the east and to the west of both Gateshead and Newcastle. See A1 (Newcastle upon Tyne) for more information.

=== Ellington to Fen Ditton scheme ===
The A14 Ellington to Fen Ditton scheme, also known as the Huntingdon Bypass required a redesigned interchange at Brampton. As a result the A1 was widened to a D3 standard from the current end of the A1(M) to the slip roads connecting directly onto the A14. South of the new Interchange the A1 was realigned but kept as a 2 lane dual carriageway. This scheme was meant to result in the A1 becoming the A1(M) along the upgraded sections, however the legal proceedings for this did not take place, and instead features a large amount of restrictions, similar to a motorway. This scheme was opened in December 2019.

=== A52 Grantham Southern Relief Road ===
The new junction is now complete on the A1 south of Grantham, Highways England constructed 4 new slip roads to connect the A1 Trunk Road to the new Grantham Southern Relief Road (A52) being constructed by Lincolnshire County Council. This will create a southern entry to Grantham and also to the site known as the 'King 31 Development'. The Grade Separated Junction on the A1 was opened to traffic in December 2022. The ongoing phase three is the Southern Quadrant Link Road (SQLR), which will complete the relief road. In August 2025, Lincolnshire County Council said the relief road would not open in 2026; its project timeline listed full completion as projected for 2028.

=== Scotswood to North Brunton upgrade ===
The Scotswood to North Brunton upgrade, which was completed in November 2022 at a cost of £110 million, added a 5-mile (8.0 km) additional lane in each direction between junctions 74 and 79.

== Ongoing developments ==
=== A1 Birtley to Coal House widening ===
Between junctions 65 (Birtley) and 67 (Coal House), the Newcastle Bypass is being widened in a project that includes replacing the existing bridge over the East Coast Main Line. Works started in December 2021 and are due to be completed in spring 2026. Additions included the Allerdene bridge for northbound traffic, and the North Dene footbridge.

=== Black Cat roundabout replacement ===
In December 2014 a scheme was announced to dual the A428 from the A1/A421 Black Cat roundabout to Cambourne. The existing traffic signal controlled roundabout would be replaced with a grade-separated junction. A new grade separated junction will allow the A1 and A421 traffic to pass over each other, with a middle level roundabout connecting them together including links to local roads. When completed this will remove one of the last five roundabouts on the A1 from Sterling corner to the Berwick bypass. The works, part of the A428 Black Cat to Caxton Gibbet improvements project, are ongoing. As of 2024, progress has included key infrastructure such as bridges and slip roads.

== Proposed developments ==
=== A1(M) Red House to Darrington motorway ===
In the "Road investment strategy" announced to Parliament by the Department for Transport and Secretary of State for Transport on 1 December 2014, planning will begin to upgrade the road in South Yorkshire to raise the last non-motorway section from Red House to Darrington to motorway standard.

=== A1 Morpeth to Ellingham ===
The announcement then said that the road from Morpeth to Ellingham would be upgraded to dual carriageway. The selection of the preferred route was scheduled for the year 2017, with construction due to begin in 2019. In response to questions regarding transport in the north, Highways England stated that a new dual carriageway section between Morpeth and Felton and also that of Alnwick to Ellingham would start in 2021 with full opening in 2023. However in June 2022 UK government minister Grant Shapps delayed a decision about a Development Consent Order signing off on National Highways' plans until December 2022.

=== A1 North of Ellingham ===
Measures were also announced to enhance the performance and safety of the A1 north of Ellingham to include three sections of climbing lanes, five junctions with improved right turn refuges, and better crossing facilities for pedestrians and cyclists. Start of construction is scheduled for 2018.

=== A46 Newark northern bypass scheme ===
It was then also announced that planning would begin to upgrade the Newark northern bypass to dual carriageway, and the A46 junction with the A1 will be replaced to support nearby housing growth and improve links from the A1 to Newark and Lincoln. The DCO is due to be submitted in early 2024, with construction likely to start in 2026 if approved.

=== A1(M) Doncaster By-pass ===
In 2014, the government included a proposal to widen the Doncaster By-pass to three lanes in its "Road investment strategy", however no further announcements were made and this section of motorway remains unaltered.

=== Sandy-Beeston By-pass ===
Sandy-Beeston Bypass
- Location: Bedfordshire
- Proposer: Highways Agency
- Cost estimate: £67 million
- Start date: 2016

In 2003 a proposal for a bypass of Sandy and Beeston, Bedfordshire, was put forward as a green-lighted scheme as part of a government multi-modal study, with a cost of £67 million. However, the Highways Agency was unwilling to confirm the information as the study was preliminary and intended for future publication. In 2008 the proposal was submitted for consideration in the pre-2013/14 Regional Funding Advice 2 Programme of the East of England Development Agency.

=== A1(M) technology enhancements and upgrades; A1 East of England feasibility study ===
It was also announced in 2014 that new technology would be implemented to bring the road to motorway standards, including detection loops, CCTV cameras and variable message signs to provide better information for drivers and active traffic management across Tyne and Wear, while Junction 6 (Welwyn North) to Junction 8 (Hitchin) would be upgraded to smart motorway, including widening of a two-lane section to dual three lanes and hard shoulder running. This plan to upgrade to smart motorway has now been cancelled.

A strategic study will examine how to improve the safety and performance of the A1 between Peterborough and the M25, including whether to upgrade the old dual carriageway section to motorway standard.

== A1(M) ==

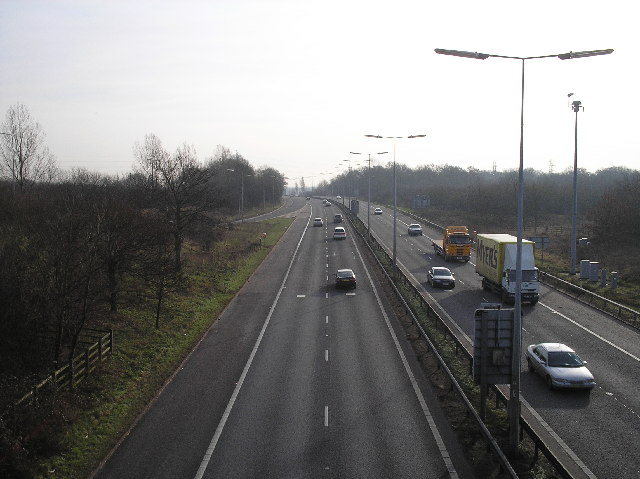
A1(M) looking southwards from junction 2 at Hatfield

Some sections of the A1 have been upgraded to motorway standard. These are known as the A1(M) and include:

=== M25 to Stotfold ===
The M25 to Stotfold section is 23 miles (37 km), and was constructed between 1962 and 1986. The main destinations are Hatfield, Welwyn Garden City, Stevenage, and Letchworth. It opened in five stages: junctions 1 to 2 in 1979; 2 to 4 in 1986; 4 to 6 in 1973; 6 to 8 in 1962; and 8 to 10 in 1967.

=== Alconbury to Peterborough ===
The Alconbury to Peterborough section is 14 miles (23 km), and opened in 1998.

=== Doncaster Bypass ===
The Doncaster By-pass opened in 1961 and is one of the oldest sections of motorway in Britain. It is 15 miles (24 km) long, and runs from Blyth to Carcroft.

=== Darrington to Gateshead ===
The Darrington to Gateshead section was constructed between 1965 and 2018. It is 93 miles (150 km), and opened in sections:

- Junctions 56 to 59 in 1965
- Junctions 59 to 63 in 1969
- Junctions 63 to 65 in 1970
- Walshford to 49 in 1995
- Junctions 43 to 44 in 1999

When this section opened it ended at a temporary terminus south of the M1. There was a final exit into Micklefield Village for non-motorway traffic onto what is now the access road. During the first week of June 2009, Junctions 44 and 45 were renumbered 43 and 44. At the same time the A1/A659 Grange Moor junction became A1(M) Junction 45. As a result many atlases show incorrect junction numbering for this stretch of motorway.

- Junction 46 to temporary junction at Walshford opened in 2005
- Junction 40 to south of 43 opened in 2005 & 2006

The northern section of the upgrade, bypassing Fairburn village opened in April 2005 with a temporary connection with the A1 between Fairburn and Brotherton. The southern section, with a free-flow interchange with the M62 motorway opened on 13 January 2006.

- Junctions 44 to 46 opened in 2009
- Junctions 49 to 51 opened as of 31 March 2012. Work began in March 2009 to upgrade the Dishforth to Leeming section to dual three-lane motorway standard with existing connections being replaced by two new junctions. This work was completed on 31 March 2012.
- Junctions 51 to 56 opened in 2017 & 2018.

== Junctions ==
A1 Road junctions – Central London to South Mimms
Northbound exits (A carriageway)	Junction	Southbound exits (B carriageway)
Services		No exit
A5100 – Burnt Oak, Edgware, Mill Hill, Broadway	Mill Hill Circus	A5100 – Burnt Oak, Edgware, Mill Hill, Broadway
A41 – Aylesbury, Watford, Harrow, (M1), (M25) West A5109 – Edgware		A41 – Aylesbury, Watford, Harrow, (M1), (M25) West A5109 – Edgware
A411 – Watford, Elstree, Barnet, Arkley	Stirling Corner	A411 – Watford, Elstree, Barnet, Arkley
A5135 – Borehamwood, Shenley, Council Offices, DVLA/DSA, (B462)		A5135 – Borehamwood, Shenley, Council Offices, DVLA/DSA, (B462)
A1(M) Motorway junctions – South Mimms to Stotfold
Northbound exits (A carriageway)	Junction	Southbound exits (B carriageway)
M25 – (M1), (M3), (M11), (M4), (M40), (M23), (M20), Heathrow, Gatwick, Stansted A1081 – Barnet South Mimms Services	J1 Services	Road continues as A1 to London
A1001 – Welham Green	J2	No access
A1001 – Hatfield A414 – St Albans	J3	A1001 – Welham Green A414 – St Albans
A414 – Hertford A6129 – Welwyn Garden City	J4	A1001- Hatfield A414 – Hertford A6129 – Welwyn Garden City
Ramp on Only	J5	No access
A1000 – Welwyn	J6	A1000 – Welwyn Garden City, Welwyn
A602 – Stevenage	J7	A602 – Stevenage, Ware
A602 – Stevenage, Hitchin, Luton Airport	J8	A602 – Stevenage, Hitchin, Luton Airport
A505 – Letchworth, Baldock	J9	A505 – Letchworth, Baldock
A507 – Stotfold, Shefford, Baldock Services	J10 Services	A507 – Stotfold, Baldock Baldock Services
A1 Road junctions – Stotfold to Alconbury
Northbound exits (A carriageway)	Junction	Southbound exits (B carriageway)
Langford, Edworth, Hinxworth	Langford Turn	Langford, Edworth, Ashwell, Hinxworth
A6001 – Biggleswade	Biggleswade Roundabout	A6001 – Biggleswade
A6001 – Biggleswade, Old Warden	Old Warden Roundabout	A6001 – Biggleswade, Old Warden
A603 – Bedford B1042 – Sandy	Sandy Roundabout	A603 – Bedford B1042 – Sandy
Blunham		Blunham, Tempsford, Little Barford, Everton
A421 – Milton Keynes, Bedford, (M1)	Black Cat roundabout	A421 – Milton Keynes, Bedford, (M1)
A428 – Cambridge, St Neots, Eaton Socon		A428 – Cambridge, St Neots, Eaton Socon
B645 – Kimbolton B1048 – Little Paxton		B645 – St Neots B1048 – Little Paxton
B1041 – Little Paxton, Southoe, Diddington		B1041 – Little Paxton, Southoe, Diddington
B661 – Kimbolton, Buckden	Buckden Roundabout	B661 – Kimbolton, Buckden
B1514 – Brampton, RAF Brampton		B1514 – Brampton, RAF Brampton
A14 – London (E), Stansted Airport, Felixstowe, Cambridge		No exit
A14 – THE MIDLANDS, Kettering, Corby, (M1), (M6) A141 – Huntingdon, Brampton	Brampton Hut Interchange	A14 – THE MIDLANDS, Harwich, Felixstowe, (M1), (M6) A141 – Huntingdon, Brampton
B1043 – Peterborough, Huntingdon, The Stukeleys, Alconbury Weald, Monks Wood, Upton, (A1(M)), (A1307)		B1043 – Peterborough, Huntingdon, The Stukeleys, Alconbury Weald, Monks Wood, Upton, (A1(M)), (A1307)
A1(M) Motorway junctions – Alconbury to Peterborough
Northbound exits (A carriageway)	Junction	Southbound exits (B carriageway)
No exit	J14	A1307 – Huntingdon, St lves
B1043 – Sawtry, Ramsey, (B660)	J15	B1043 – Sawtry, Ramsey, (B660)
A15 – Yaxley, Haddon B1043 – Stilton, Holme, Ramsey, Glatton, (B660)	J16	A15 – Yaxley, Haddon B1043 – Stilton, Holme, Ramsey, Glatton, (B660)
A605 – Northampton, Oundle, Elton A1139 – Peterborough, Wisbech, Orton Centre, Peterborough Business Park, (A47) Peterborough Services	J17 Services	A605 – Northampton, Oundle, Elton A1139 – Peterborough, Wisbech, Orton Centre, Peterborough Business Park, (A47) Peterborough Services
A1 Road junctions – Peterborough to Blyth
Northbound exits (A carriageway)	Junction	Southbound exits (B carriageway)
Showground, Chesterton, Alwalton, Elton		Showground, Chesterton, Alwalton, Elton
Sibson, Elton, Stibbington, Stibbington truckstop		Sibson, Elton, Stibbington, Stibbington truckstop
B671 – Wansford		No exit
A47 – Peterborough (North), Ailsworth, Castor, Sacrewell Farm Centre, Leicester		A47 – Peterborough (North), Ailsworth, Castor, Sacrewell Farm Centre, Leicester
Thornhaugh		No exit
No exit		Barnack
Wittering		Wittering
No exit		Barnack
Easton on the hill		No exit
B1081 – Stamford, Burghley House		B1081 – Stamford, Burghley House
No exit		A43 – Kettering, Corby, Leicester, (A427), (A47) A1175 – Stamford
A6121 – Ketton, Tinwell, Spalding, Stamford, (A16)		A6121 – Ketton, Tinwell, Spalding, Stamford, (A16)
A606 – Oakham, Melton, Stamford		A606 – Oakham, Melton, Stamford
No exit		B1081 – Stamford
Empingham, Pickworth, Exton		Empingham, Pickworth, Exton
B668 – Oakham		B668 – Oakham
South Witham, Stamford, Castle Bytham		South Witham, Stamford, Castle Bytham
Lobthorpe, Swayfield		Lobthorpe, Swayfield
North Witham, Gunby		North Witham, Gunby
Honey Pot Lane Industrial Estate		Honey Pot Lane Industrial Estate
B6403 – Colsterworth, North Witham		B6403 – Colsterworth, North Witham
A151 – Bourne, Corby Glen, Grimsthorpe B676 – Melton Mowbray, Colsterworth		A151 – Bourne, Corby Glen, Grimsthorpe B676 – Melton Mowbray, Colsterworth
B6403 – Easton, Ancaster		B6403 – Easton, Ancaster
Skillington, Stainby, Buckminster		Skillington, Stainby, Buckminster
Stoke Rochford, Skillington		Stoke Rochford, Skillington
Boothby Pagnell		Boothby Pagnell
Hungerton		Hungerton
B1174 – Grantham, Boston, Sleaford, (A52), (A153)		No exit
Boston, Grantham, (B1174)	Spittlegate Junction	Boston, Grantham, (B1174)
A607 – Grantham, Melton Mowbray, Harlaxton		A607 – Grantham, Melton Mowbray, Harlaxton
A52 – Grantham, Barrowby, Nottingham	Barrowby Junction	A52 – Grantham, Barrowby, Nottingham
B1174 – Grantham, Great Gonnerby, Downtown Moto Grantham North Service	Gonerby Moor Interchange Services	B1174 – Grantham, Great Gonnerby, Downtown Moto Grantham North Service
Barkston, Marston		Barkston, Marston
Allington		Foston
Long Bennington, Staunton, Foston, Roseland Business Park		Long Bennington, Staunton, Foston, Roseland Business Park
Long Bennington, Cotham		Long Bennington, Cotham
B6326 – Claypole		B6326 – Claypole
B6326 – Claypole, Balderton, Newark		B6326 – Claypole, Balderton, Newark
Coddington		Coddington
A46 – Leicester, Lorry Park, Southwell, Manfield, Nottingham, (A52), (A617), (A612) A17 – Sleaford B6166 – Newark	Winthorpe Interchange/ Brownshill Roundabout	A46 – Leicester, Lorry Park, Southwell, Manfield, Nottingham, (A52), (A617), (A612) A17 – Sleaford B6166 – Newark
B6325 – Ollerton, South Muskham, Newark, (A616)		B6325 – Ollerton, South Muskham, Newark, (A616)
North Muskham, Bathley, Caunton		North Muskham, Bathley, Caunton
Cromwell		Cromwell
No exit		Carlton-on-Trent
B1164 – Carlton, Sutton-on-Trent, Weston, Normanton-on-Trent, Kneesall		B1164 – Carlton, Sutton-on-Trent, Weston, Normanton-on-Trent, Kneesall
Tuxford		Tuxford
A57 – Lincoln, East Markham A638 – Retford B1164 – Tuxford, Ollerton, (A6075)	Markham Moor Interchange	A57 – Lincoln, East Markham A638 – Retford B1164 – Tuxford, Ollerton, (A6075)
Bothamsall, (B6387)		No exit
No exit		West Drayton
B6387 – Retford, Ollerton		B6387 – Retford, Ollerton
Elkesley village		No exit
Ordsall, Elkesley		Ordsall, Elkesley
A57 – Worksop, Sheffield A614 – Nottingham, Ollerton B6420 – Babworth	Apleyhead Interchange	A57 – Worksop, Sheffield A614 – Nottingham, Ollerton B6420 – Babworth
A620 – Retford, Ranby B6079 – Worksop		A620 – Retford, Ranby B6079 – Worksop
No exit		Barnby Moor
Blyth, Ranskill		No exit
A1(M) Motorway junctions – Blyth to Skellow
Northbound exits (A carriageway)	Junction	Southbound exits (B carriageway)
A614 – Bawtry, Gainsborough, Robbin Hood Airport, (A631) B6045 – Blyth Moto Blyth Service	J34 Services	A614 – Bawtry, Gainsborough, Robbin Hood Airport, (A631) B6045 – Blyth Moto Blyth Service
M18 – Sheffield, Doncaster, Scunthorpe, Hull, (M180), (M62(E)), (M1)	J35	M18 – Sheffield, Doncaster, Scunthorpe, Hull, (M180), (M62(E)), (M1)
A630 – Sheffield, Rotherham, Conisbrough, Doncaster, Balby, Racecourse Lakeside	J36	A630 – Sheffield, Rotherham, Conisbrough, Doncaster, Balby, Racecourse Lakeside
A635 – Barnsley, Brodsworth Hall, Doncaster, Scawsby, Cusworth Hall, (A638)	J37	A635 – Barnsley, Brodsworth Hall, Doncaster, Scawsby, Cusworth Hall, (A638)
A638 – Wakefield, Doncaster	J38	A638 – Wakefield, Doncaster
A1 Road junctions – Skellow to Darrington
Northbound exits (A carriageway)	Junction	Southbound exits (B carriageway)
Hampole Service		B1220 – Skellow
No exit		Burghwallis
Skelbrooke		Campsall
A639 – Pontefract A6201 – Hemsworth, South Elmsall, Upton		A639 – Pontefract A6201 – Hemsworth, South Elmsall, Upton
Thorpe Audlin		Kirk Smeaton
Wentbridge, Kirk Smeaton		Wentbridge, Kirk Smeaton
B6474 – Wentbridge		No exit
Womersley, Darrington		Womersley, Darrington
A162 – Hull, Pontefract, (A645), (M62)		No Exit
A1(M) Motorway junctions – Darrington to Newcastle
Northbound exits (A carriageway)	Junction	Southbound exits (B carriageway)
M62 – Manchester, Leeds	J41	M62 – Manchester, Hull
A63 – Leeds, Selby	J42	A63 – Leeds, Selby
No exit	J43	M1 – London, Leeds, Manchester, (M62)
A64 – Leeds, York	J44	A64 – Leeds (North), York
A659 – Wetherby, Collingham, Otley, Boston Spa, Tadcaster, (A168)	J45	A659 – Wetherby, Collingham, Otley, Boston Spa, Tadcaster, (A168)
B1224 – Wetherby, York, Moto Wetherby Service	J46 Services	B1224 – Wetherby, York, Moto Wetherby Service
A59 – Knaresbrorogh, Harrogate, York	J47	A59 – Knaresbrorogh, Harrogate, York
A6055 – Boroughbridge, Ripon, Dishforth, (A168)	J48	A6055 – Boroughbridge, Ripon, Dishforth, (A168)
A168 – Thirsk, Teesside, (A19)	J49	A168 – Thirsk, Teesside, (A19)
A61 – Ripon, Thirsk, Baldersby, Skipton-on-Swale, Topcliffe, (A167) A6055 – Bedale, Masham	J50	A61 – Ripon, Thirsk, Baldersby, Skipton-on-Swale, Topcliffe, (A167) A6055 – Bedale, Masham
A684 – Leyburn, Bedale, Northallerton, (B6285) A6055 – Leeming, Hackforth, Hornby, Kirkby Fleetham, Fencotes	J51	A684 – Leyburn, Bedale, Northallerton, (B6285) A6055 – Leeming, Hackforth, Hornby, Kirkby Fleetham, Fencotes
A6055 – Catterick, Brompton-on-Swale, Colburn, Catterick Garrison, Richmond, (A6136)	J52	A6055 – Catterick, Brompton-on-Swale, Colburn, Catterick Garrison, Richmond, (A6136)
A66 – Brough, Penrith A6055 – Richmond, Barton, Piercebridge, (A6108), (B6275) Moto Scotch Corner Rest Area	J53 Rest area	A66 – Brough, Penrith A6055 – Richmond, Barton, Piercebridge, (A6108), (B6275) Moto Scotch Corner Rest Area
Barton, Croft-on-Tees, Stapleton, Darlington, (A6055) B6275 – Melsonby, Piercebridge	J56	Barton, Croft-on-Tees, Stapleton, Darlington, (A6055) B6275 – Melsonby, Piercebridge
A66(M) – Darlington, Teesside	J57	No exit
A68 – Darlington, Corbridge, Bishop Auckland, Shildon	J58	A68 – Darlington, Corbridge, Bishop Auckland, Shildon
A167 – Newton Aycliffe, Spennymoor, Durham Tees Valley Airport, Darlington, (A688)	J59	A167 – Newton Aycliffe, Spennymoor, Durham Tees Valley Airport, Darlington, (A688)
A689 – Teesside, Sedgefield, Bishop Auckland	J60	A689 – Teesside, Sedgefield, Bishop Auckland
A688 – Bishop Auckland, Spennymoor, Sedgefield, Peterlee, Quarrington Hill, Coxhoe, (A177)	J61	A688 – Bishop Auckland, Spennymoor, Sedgefield, Peterlee, Quarrington Hill, Coxhoe, (A177)
A690 – Durham, Sunderland, Consett, (A691)	J62	A690 – Durham, Sunderland, Consett, (A691)
A167 – Chester-le-Street, Durham, Stanley, Birtley, (A693) A183 – Bournmoor	J63	A167 – Chester-le-Street, Durham, Stanley, Birtley, (A693) A183 – Bournmoor
A195 – Washington, Birtley Moto Washington Services	J64 Services	A195 – Washington, Birtley Moto Washington Services
A194(M) – Tyne Tunnel, South Shields	J65	A1231 – Washington, Sunderland, Springwell, (B1288)
A1 Road junctions – Newcastle to Edinburgh
Northbound exits (A carriageway)	Junction	Southbound exits (B carriageway)
A167 – Birtley, Gateshead, Newcastle B1295 – Wrekenton	J66	A167 – Birtley, Gateshead, Newcastle B1295 – Wrekenton
Team Valley	J67	Team Valley
A692 – Consett, Whickham, (B6317) B1426 – Gateshead	J68	A692 – Consett, Whickham, (B6317) B1426 – Gateshead
A184 – Central Newcastle, Central Gateshead	J69	A184 – Central Newcastle, Central Gateshead
Dunston, Whickham	J70	Dunston, Whickham
Metro Centre	J71	Metro Centre
B6317 – Swalwell, Whickham	J72	No exit
No exit	J73	A694 – Consett, Whickham, Swalwell, Newcastle, Blaydon, (A695)
No exit	J74	A191 – Scotswood, Denton Burn A695 – Riverside Route, City Centre, Quayside, Walker, (A186), (B1600) A6085 – Bells Close, Newburn, Riverside, Lemington
A69 – Hexham A186 – City West, Crematorium, General Hospital, Fenham, Denton, (B1305)	J75	A69 – Hexham A186 – City West, Crematorium, General Hospital, Fenham, Denton, (B1305)
B6324 – Westerhope, City Centre, (A167)	J76	B6324 – Westerhope, City Centre, (A167)
A167 – City Centre A696 – Woolsington, Newcastle International Airport B6918 – Airport	J77	A167 – City Centre A696 – Woolsington, Newcastle International Airport B6918 – Airport
Kingston Park, Newcastle (N), Fawdon	J78	Kingston Park, Newcastle (N), Fawdon
A1056 – Wide Open, Killingworth B1318 – Gosforth, City (North)	J79	A1056 – Wide Open, Killingworth B1318 – Gosforth, City (North)
A19 – Tyne Tunnel A1068 – Cramlington, Ashington, Blyth, (A189) B1318 – Seaton Burn	J80	A19 – Tyne Tunnel A1068 – Cramlington, Ashington, Blyth, (A189) B1318 – Seaton Burn
No exit		Shotton, Ponteland, Dinnington, Blagdon
Stannington		No exit
Bedlington, Hepscott, Stannington Station, Netherton Park		Bedlington, Hepscott, Stannington Station, Netherton Park
B1337 – Morpeth		No exit
A197 – Ashington, Morpeth, (A192)		A197 – Ashington, Morpeth, (A192)
A697 – Coldstream, Wooler, Rothbury, (B6344)		No exit
Longhirst, Cockle Park, Hebron		Longhirst, Cockle Park, Hebron
Ulgham, Tritlington		Ulgham, Tritlington
Fenrother		Fenrother
Earsdon		Earsdon
Amble, Acklington, Widdrington, Chevington Moor, (A1068)		Amble, Acklington, Widdrington, Chevington Moor, (A1068)
Fieldhead, Causey Park		Fieldhead, Causey Park
Eshott, Helm		Eshott, Helm
Eshottheugh		Eshottheugh
Longhorsley		Longhorsley
Weldon Bridge, Bywell		Weldon Bridge, Bywell
Amble, Warkworth Castle, Thirston, Felton, (B6345)		Amble, Warkworth Castle, Thirston, Felton, (B6345)
Amble, Felton, (B6345)		Amble, Felton, (B6345)
Swarland, Longframlington		Swarland, Longframlington
Swarland, Acklington, Guyzance		Swarland, Acklington, Guyzance
Longframlington, Newton on the Moor		Longframlington, Newton on the Moor
Longframlington, Newton on the Moor		Longframlington, Newton on the Moor
Shilbottle		Shilbottle
Alnmouth, Shilbottle		Alnmouth, Shilbottle
Deanmoor		Deanmoor
Whittingham		Whittingham
A1068 – Alnwick, Alnmouth		A1068 – Alnwick, Alnmouth
B1340 – Alnwick, Denwick, Seahouses		B1340 – Alnwick, Denwick, Seahouses
B6347 – South Charlton, Eglingham, (B6346)		B6347 – South Charlton, Eglingham, (B6346)
B6347 – Christon Bank, Rock, Seahouses, (B1340)		B6347 – Christon Bank, Rock, Seahouses, (B1340)
Quarryhouse, Hepburn, Chillingham, North Charlton		Quarryhouse, Hepburn, Chillingham, North Charlton
Brownieside		Brownieside
Ellingham, Doxford Hall, Preston, Chathill, Preston Tower		Ellingham, Doxford Hall, Preston, Chathill, Preston Tower
Wandylaw		Wandylaw
Newham		Newham
Newstead		Newstead
