= Hebron, Northumberland =

Village in Northumberland, England

Coordinates: 55.201421°N 1.6964510°W

Hebron
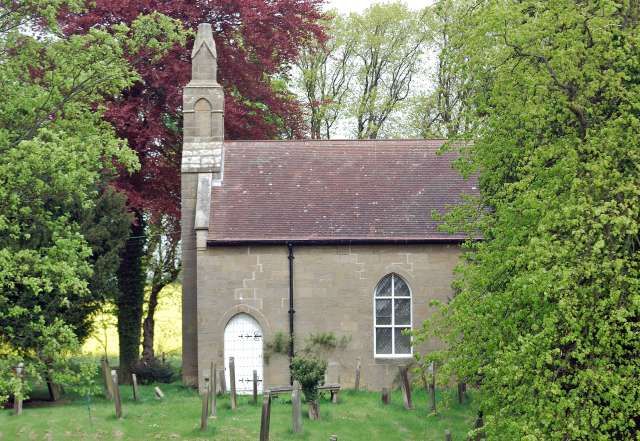

- Location within Northumberland
- Area: 20.2 km^{2} (7.8 sq mi)
- Population: 422 (2011 census)
  - Density: 21/km^{2} (54/sq mi)
- Civil parish: Hebron
- Unitary authority: Northumberland
- Ceremonial county: Northumberland
- Region: North East
- Country: England
- Sovereign state: United Kingdom
- Post town: MORPETH
- Postcode district: NE61
- Police: Northumbria
- Fire: Northumberland
- Ambulance: North East
- UK Parliament: North Northumberland

Hebron is a village and civil parish in the county of Northumberland, England. It is 2 miles (3.2 km) north of Morpeth. In 2011 the parish had a population of 422. The parish touches Longhirst, Meldon, Mitford, Morpeth, Netherwitton, Pegswood, Tritlington and West Chevington and Ulgham. Until April 2009 the parish was in Castle Morpeth district. The surname "Hebron" derives from Hebron.

== Landmarks ==
There are 9 listed buildings in Hebron. Hebron has a church called St Cuthbert.

== History ==
The name "Hebron" means 'The high burial-mound'. The parish included the townships of Causey Park, Cockle Park, Earsdon, Earsdon Forest, Fenrother and Tritlington. On 1 April 1955 the parishes of Benridge, Cockle Park and High and Low Highlaws were abolished and merged with Hebron.
