= A197 road (England) =

Road in England

A197

Route information
- Length: 10.7 mi (17.2 km)

Major junctions
- West end: Morpeth
- A1 A192 A1068 A196 A189
- East end: Newbiggin

Location
- Country: United Kingdom

Road network
- Roads in the United Kingdom; Motorways; A and B road zones

The A197 is a road in Northumberland, in the United Kingdom. It connects Morpeth, Pegswood, Ashington and Newbiggin by the Sea.

== History ==
- Morpeth Northern Bypass: In 2016, the Morpeth Northern Bypass was completed, extending the A197 to the A1 and creating a grade-separated junction. This development aimed to improve traffic flow and provide better connectivity in the region.
- Listed Milepost: A mid-19th-century cast-iron milepost is located 530 meters east of the A197/B1337 junction. This Grade II listed structure indicates distances to Newbiggin (7.5 miles) and Morpeth (2 miles), reflecting the road's historical significance.

== Route ==
The road starts at the A1 (Note: 55.1375°N 1.6817°W) and heads north into Loansdean (Note: 55.1570°N 1.6906°W) and Morpeth, where it has a junction with the A192 (Note: 55.1632°N 1.6850°W) (Note: 55.1670°N 1.6864°W) and then leaves north until it reaches a roundabout with the B1337. (Note: 55.1797°N 1.6694°W)

From the roundabout it heads east, passing Pegswood on its north and enters into Ashington where it has a junction with the A1068 (Note: 55.1833°N 1.6025°W) (Note: 55.1845°N 1.5954°W) and a junction with the A196. (Note: 55.1855°N 1.5705°W) After leaving Ashington it reaches its west terminus at a roundabout with the A189. (Note: 55.1873°N 1.5389°W)

== Junctions ==
| County | Location | mi | km | Destinations | Notes |
|---|---|---|---|---|---|
| Northumberland | Morpeth | 0 | 0 | A1 – Newcastle upon Tyne | Southbound entrance to A1 and Northbound exit from A1 only |
| Northumberland | Morpeth | 1.4 | 2.3 | B6524 – Whalton | |
| Northumberland | Morpeth | 2.0 | 3.2 | A192 – Nedderton | |
| Northumberland | Morpeth | 2.3 | 3.7 | A192 – Pigdon | |
| Northumberland | Morpeth | 3.6 | 5.8 | B1337 – Longhirst | |
| Northumberland | Ashington | 6.5 | 10.4 | A1068 – Guide Post, Bedlington | |
| Northumberland | Ashington | 6.8 | 10.9 | A1068 – Widdrington | |
| Northumberland | Ashington | 7.8 | 12.6 | A196 – Guide Post | |
| Northumberland | Ashington | 9.1 | 14,7 | A189 – Cramlington, Widdrington | |
1.000 mi = 1.609 km; 1.000 km = 0.621 mi: Incomplete access
