= Listed buildings in Dishforth =

Dishforth is a civil parish in the county of North Yorkshire, England. It contains twelve listed buildings that are recorded in the National Heritage List for England. All the listed buildings are designated at Grade II, the lowest of the three grades, which is applied to "buildings of national importance and special interest". The parish contains the village of Dishforth and the surrounding area. All the listed buildings are in the village and, apart from a church converted into a village hall, all the listed buildings are houses and associated structures.

== Buildings ==
| Name and location | Photograph | Date | Notes |
|---|---|---|---|
| Corner Cottage and outbuilding 54.15285°N 1.41565°W | — | Early to mid 18th century | The house and outbuilding are in limestone with pantile roofs. The house has two storeys and two bays, and contains a central doorway and horizontally-sliding sash windows. The outhouse to the left has a single storey and two bays, the left bay in brick. |
| East View House; 54.15193°N 1.41566°W | — | Early to mid 18th century | The house is rendered, with an eaves band, and a pantile roof with shaped kneelers and coped gables. There are two storeys and three bays, with the gable end facing the street. On the front are a doorway and two canted bay windows with sashes. In the upper floor is a casement window and two horizontally-sliding sashes. |
| Manor House; 54.15247°N 1.41703°W | — | Early to mid 18th century | The house is in rendered brick and stone and has a grey slate roof. There are two storeys, four bays and a rear outshut. On the front is a porch with two plain columns carrying an entablature. The windows are sashes in flush wooden architraves. |
| Westcott; 54.15445°N 1.41962°W | | Early to mid 18th century | The house is in brick with stone details, chamfered quoins, a floor band, a dentilled eaves cornice, and a stone slate roof with stone gable copings and kneelers. There are two storeys and three bays. The central doorway has an alternate quoined surround and a large channelled lintel. The windows are sashes in architraves with incised wedge lintels. |
| Ivy Holme; 54.15359°N 1.41828°W | — | Mid 18th century | The house is in brown brick with a pantile roof. There are two storeys and three bays. The central doorway has an alternate quoined surround, and the windows are sashes in flush wooden architraves under cambered arches. |
| Laurel House; 54.15350°N 1.41740°W | — | Mid 18th century | The house is in red brick, with stone dressings, rusticated quoins, dentilled eaves, and a stone slate roof with stone gable copings and cut-back kneelers. The central doorway has an alternate quoined surround, and a lintel with a double keystone. The windows are sashes in flush wooden architraves with lintels and keystones. |
| Vine House; 54.15426°N 1.41898°W | — | Mid 18th century | The house is in stone, with a dentilled eaves cornice, and an M-shaped stone slate roof with stone gable copings and kneelers. There are three storeys, a double depth plan, and three bays, The central doorway has pilasters, an entablature with a pulvinated frieze, and a dentilled triangular pediment. The windows are sashes in architraves. |
| Holly Cottage; 54.15328°N 1.41789°W | — | Mid to late 18th century | The house is rendered, and has dentilled eaves, and pantile roofs with stone gable coping and kneelers. There are two storeys, three bays, and a single-storey wing on the right. The doorway is in the centre, and is flanked by sash windows in wooden architraves. The upper floor contains horizontally-sliding sash windows. |
| Wall, gate piers and gates, Manor House; 54.15257°N 1.41674°W | — | Mid to late 18th century | The front wall is in limestone with pointed coping, it is about 1.5 metres (4 ft 11 in) high and 50 metres (160 ft) long, and is ramped up to the right. The gate piers are about 2.5 metres (8 ft 2 in) high, and each pier has a deep moulded cornice and the base of a finial. The gates are in wrought iron, and have spear finials and a ramped top. |
| Crown Farmhouse; 54.15202°N 1.41581°W | — | Late 18th century | The house, which was restored in 1856, is in limestone and has a Welsh slate roof. There are two storeys and three bays. The central round-headed doorway has fluted attached columns, a fanlight, and an open dentilled pediment. The windows are sashes in architraves, with channelled wedge lintels and keystones. In the left return is a dated and initialled plaque with a crown. |
| The Vicarage; 54.15404°N 1.41852°W | — | Late 18th century | The vicarage, later a private house, is in limestone, and has a stone slate roof with gable copings and shaped kneelers. There are two storeys and three bays. The doorway has plain columns, a fanlight and an open pediment, and there is a blocked doorway to the right. The windows are sashes with channelled lintels and keystones. |
| Former Christ Church wall, railings, gates and overthrow 54.15229°N 1.41602°W | | 1791 | The church, which was altered in 1884–85, has since been converted into the village hall. It is in sandstone, with stone slates on the body of the church, and grey slate on the apse. It consists of a three-bay nave, a west porch, a north aisle, and a polygonal apse. The porch is gabled, and contains a doorway with a pointed arch, above which are two oculi, and a gabled bellcote. Enclosing the forecourt on the west and south sides is a low wall with pointed coping and a wrought iron railing. At the entrance are gates, and an overthrow with scroll decoration and a lantern bracket. |
