= Listed buildings in Kirk Smeaton =

Kirk Smeaton is a civil parish in the county of North Yorkshire, England. It contains three listed buildings that are recorded in the National Heritage List for England. Of these, one is listed at Grade II*, the middle of the three grades, and the others are at Grade II, the lowest grade. The parish contains the village of Kirk Smeaton and the surrounding area. All the listed buildings are in the village, and consist of a church, a war memorial in the churchyard, and a farmhouse.

== Key ==
Grade	Criteria
II*	Particularly important buildings of more than special interest
II	Buildings of national importance and special interest

== Buildings ==
Name and location	Photograph	Date	Notes	Grade
St Peter's Church; 53.64366°N 1.21471°W		12th century	The church has been altered and extended through the centuries, including a restoration in 1862–63. It is built in magnesian limestone with a Welsh slate roof, and consists of a nave, a north aisle, a south porch, a chancel with a north chapel and vestry, and a west tower. The tower has two stages, a chamfered plinth, diagonal buttresses, two two-light west windows, a chamfered band, two-light bell openings with a hood mould, a west clock face, a moulded string course with gargoyles, and an embattled parapet with crocketed finials.	II*
Rectory Farmhouse; 53.64289°N 1.21744°W	—	Late 17th century (probable)	The farmhouse is in magnesian limestone with a stone slate roof. There are two storeys, three bays, and a rear range. The original doorway is blocked, and has a chamfered surround and an arched lintel. The entrance in the centre is inserted into a previous window, and has a fanlight and a moulded hood. Above it is a single-light windows, the other windows on the front are casements, and in the right return are mullioned windows.	II
War memorial 53.64352°N 1.21463°W		c. 1920	The war memorial in the churchyard of St Peter's Church and is in grey granite. It consists of a tapering column surmounted by an urn, on a three-tier plinth on a single step. On the plinth are inscriptions and the names of those lost in the two World Wars. The memorial is surrounded by shingle and a low granite kerb.	II
