= Dishforth =

Village and civil parish in North Yorkshire, England

Coordinates: 54°09′10″N 1°25′03″W

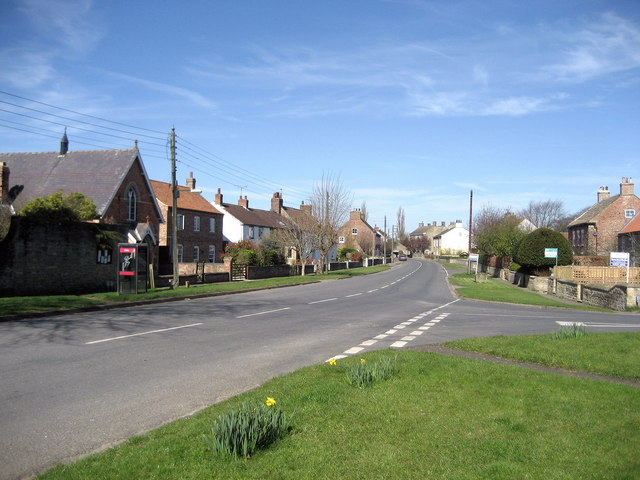
- The main street in Dishforth

- Location within North Yorkshire
- Population: 905 (2011 Census)
- OS grid reference: SE382732
- Civil parish: Dishforth
- Unitary authority: North Yorkshire
- Ceremonial county: North Yorkshire
- Region: Yorkshire and the Humber
- Country: England
- Sovereign state: United Kingdom
- Post town: THIRSK
- Postcode district: YO7
- Police: North Yorkshire
- Fire: North Yorkshire
- Ambulance: Yorkshire
- UK Parliament: Skipton and Ripon

Dishforth /ˈdɪʃfəθ/ is a village and civil parish in the county of North Yorkshire, England. Dishforth translates from Old English as dic-ford; a ford by a dike or ditch. The population of the parish taken at the 2001 census as 719 and had risen to 905 by the time of the 2011 census.

From 1974 to 2023 it was part of the Borough of Harrogate, it is now administered by the unitary North Yorkshire Council.

It is just north of Dishforth Airfield, which up until April 2016 was an Army Air Corps helicopter station.

== Geography ==
The village is close to the A1(M) and the A168. The original route of the Great North Road runs through the village but RAF Dishforth was built over the old road which used to be the A1 and later the A167. The closest town is Boroughbridge 3 miles (4.8 km) to the south.

The A168 roundabout was removed during 1988. Construction began in April 1988, costing £6.79 million. The roundabout was finally removed at the end of May 1989. The new junction partly opened in late August 1989.

== Amenities ==
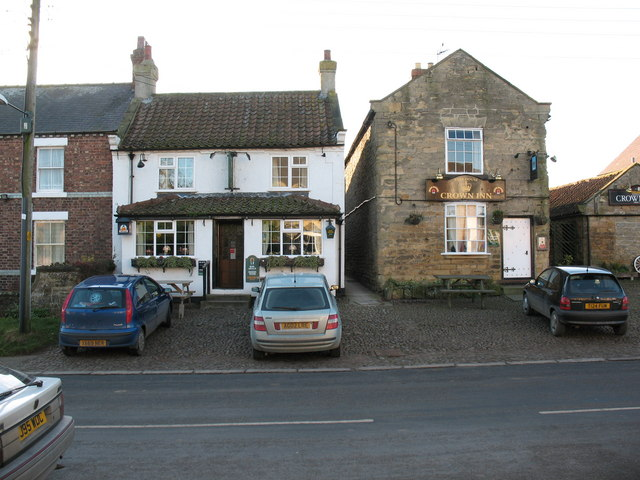
Dishforths two pubs; the Black Swan (left) and the Crown Inn (right)

The village has two pubs adjacent to one another; the Black Swan and the Crown Inn. The village has a small Methodist church, Dishforth Village Hall (which used to be the village church) and a primary school.

== See also ==
- Listed buildings in Dishforth
