= St Peter's Church, Kirk Smeaton =

Church in North Yorkshire, England

Coordinates: 53°38′37″N 1°12′53″W

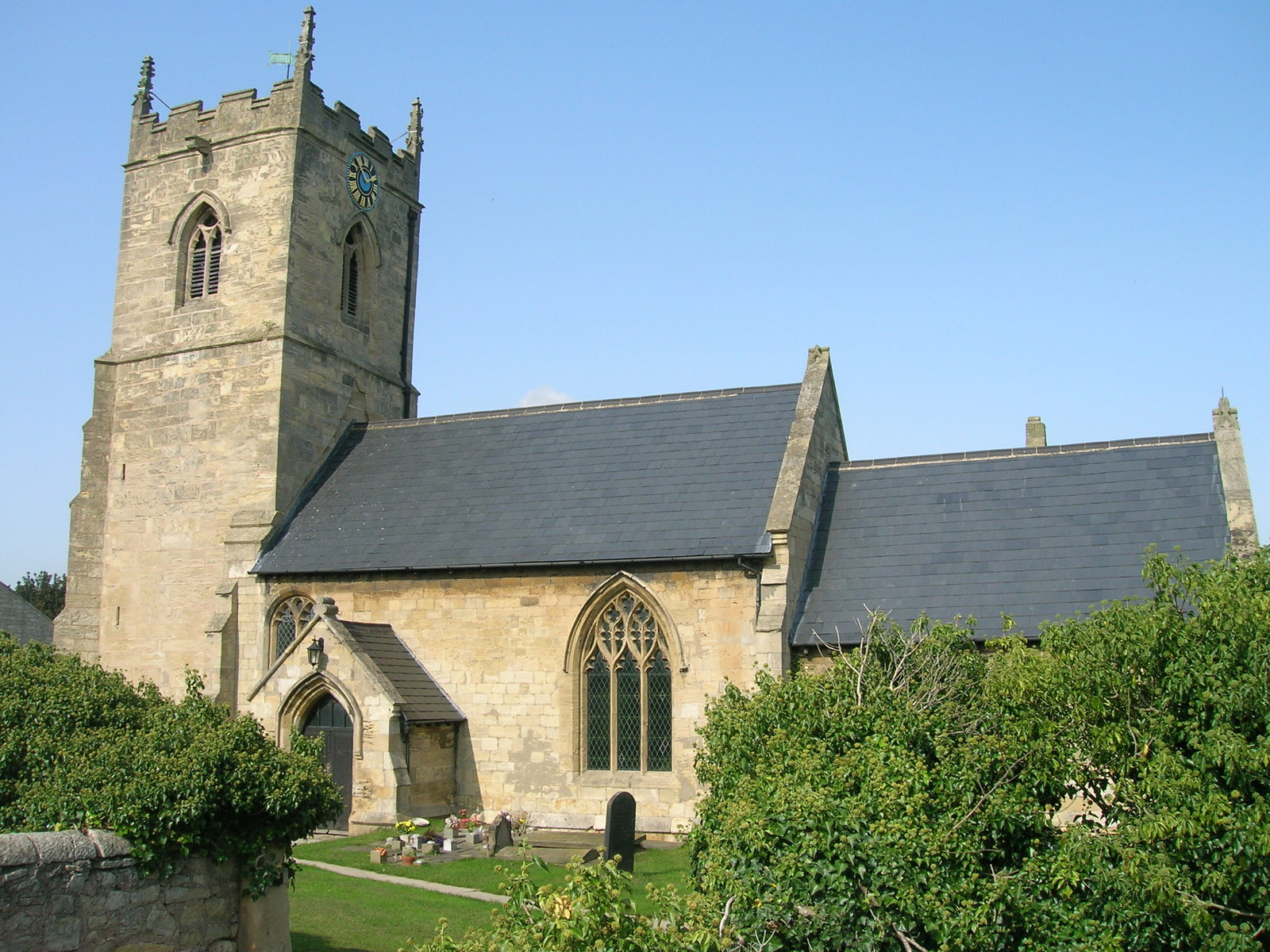
The church, in 2011

St Peter's Church is the parish church of Kirk Smeaton, a village in North Yorkshire, in England.

The church was originally built in the 12th century, from which period the tower and chancel arches survive, although the chancel arch may have been heightened in the 13th century. The building was altered in the 14th and 15th centuries, but was largely rebuilt in 1864. The church was grade II* listed in 1968.

The church is built of magnesian limestone with a Welsh slate roof, and consists of a nave, a north aisle, a south porch, a chancel with a north chapel and vestry, and a west tower. The tower has two stages, a chamfered plinth, diagonal buttresses, two two-light west windows, a chamfered band, two-light bell openings with a hood mould, a west clock face, a moulded string course with gargoyles, and an embattled parapet with crocketed finials. There is a 15th-century plank door, a triple sedilia, and a Norman tub font.

== See also ==
- Grade II* listed churches in North Yorkshire (district)
- Listed buildings in Kirk Smeaton
