= Luke Clennell =

English wood-engraver and painter (1781–1840)

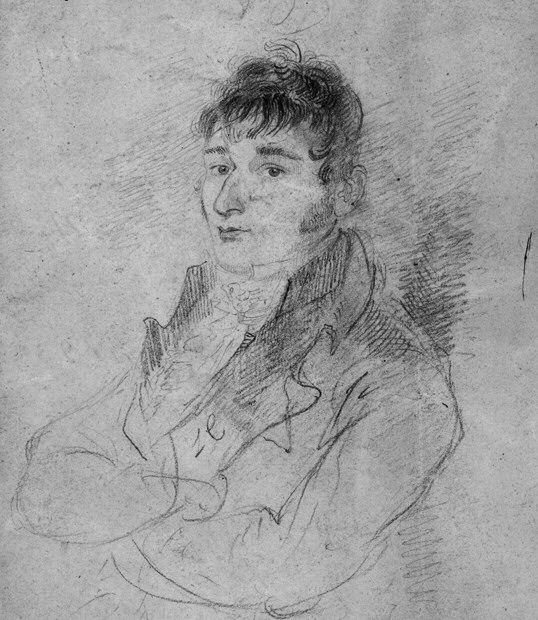
- Self-portrait, c. 1810
- Born: 8 April 1781; Morpeth, Northumberland, England
- Died: 9 February 1840 (aged 58); Newcastle upon Tyne, England
- Education: Wood engraving by Thomas Bewick
- Known for: Wood engraving, commemorative oil painting
- Notable work: The decisive charge of the Life Guards at Waterloo
- Awards: Society of Arts gold palette British Institution premium
- Patrons: Earl of Bridgewater

Luke Clennell (8 April 1781 – 9 February 1840) was a British wood-engraver and painter.

== Life ==
Clennell was born in Ulgham near Morpeth, Northumberland, the son of a farmer. He was apprenticed to the Newcastle upon Tyne wood-engraver Thomas Bewick in 1797. Between 1799 and 1803, he acted as Bewick's principal assistant on the second volume of his A History of British Birds. After completing his seven-year apprenticeship with Bewick he moved to London in 1804, where he married a daughter of the copper-engraver Charles Turner Warren (1762–1823). Through his marriage he became acquainted with such book illustrators as William Finden and Abraham Raimbach.

He gained a reputation as a wood-engraver, and in May 1806 he was awarded the gold palette of the Royal Society of Arts for a wood-engraving of a battle scene. He subsequently gave up engraving for painting. In 1814, he received from the Earl of Bridgewater a commission for a large commemorative picture, Banquet for the Allied Sovereigns, at the Guildhall, London. He experienced great difficulty in getting the more than 400 distinguished guests to sit for their portraits, suffered a mental breakdown, and spent some time in a mental asylum in Salisbury.

Clennell was one of the competitors for the prize of one thousand guineas awarded by the British Institution for the best finished sketches connected with the victories of the British Army in Spain, Portugal and France, the works to be submitted to the British Gallery in January 1816. Thirteen artists submitted works, and Clennell received one of the premiums for his picture entitled The decisive charge of the Life Guards at Waterloo.

Clennell resumed work on the picture of the Allied Sovereigns in 1817, but suffered another bout of depressive mental illness, and his family found him throwing his palette and brushes at the canvas, "to get the proper expression." From then until his death in a Newcastle asylum in 1840 he was never well enough to work as an artist.

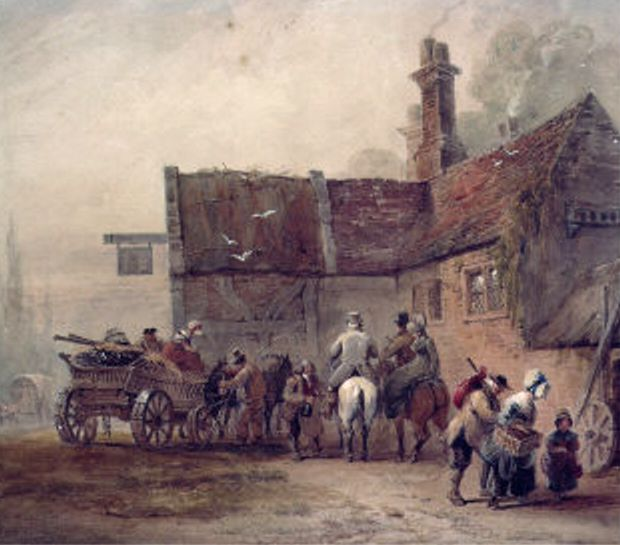
A Wayside Inn

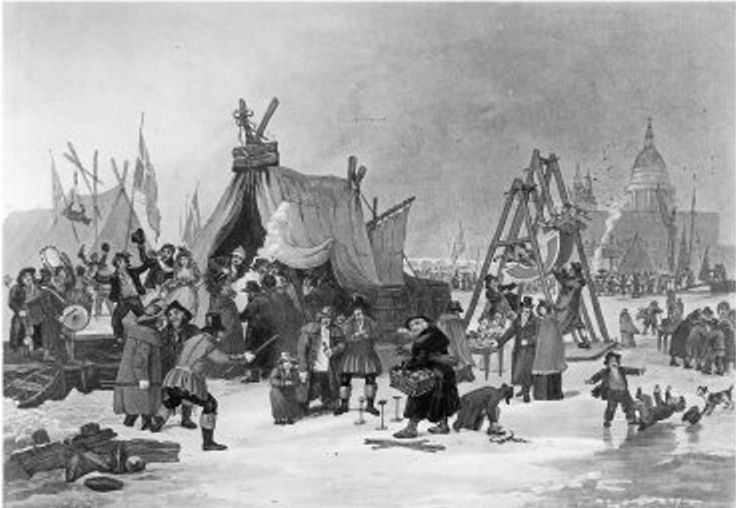
The Fair on the Thames

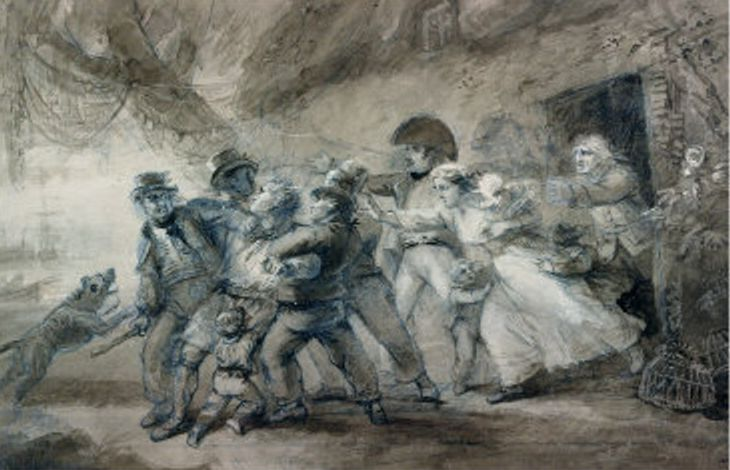
The Press Gang

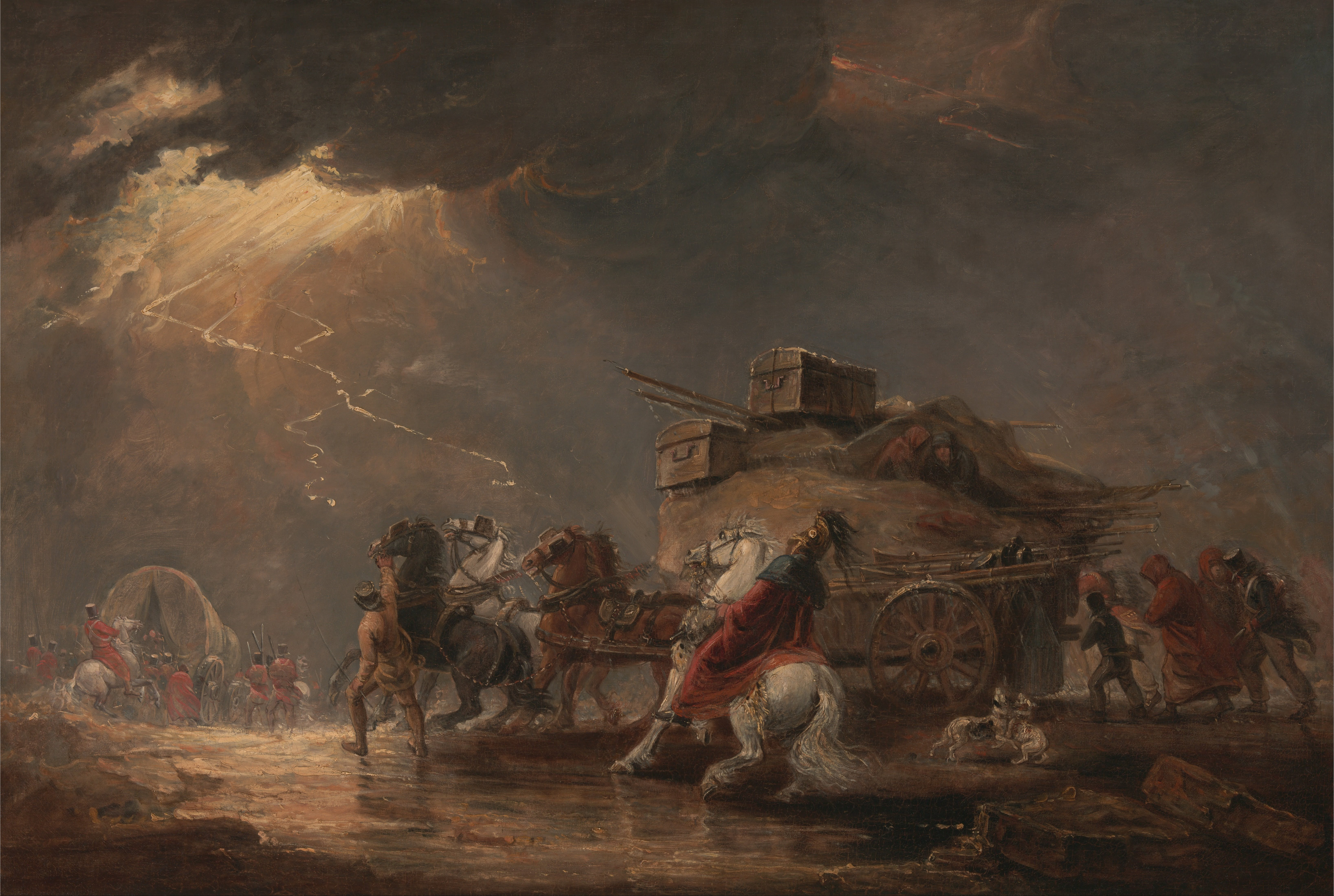
Baggage Wagons in a Thunderstorm

== Sources ==
- Bain, Iain. Clennell, Luke, 1781–1840 (Oxford Dictionary of National Biography).
- Stephen, Leslie, ed. (1887). "Clennell, Luke" . Dictionary of National Biography. Vol. 11. London: Smith, Elder & Co. pp. 35–7.
- Harrington, Peter (1993). British Artists and War: The Face of Battle in Paintings and Prints, 1700-1914. London: Greenhill. pp. 99–101.
- Story, Alfred Thomas. James Holmes and John Varley (London: R. Bentley, 1894).
- Uglow, Jenny. Nature's Engraver. A Life of Thomas Bewick. (London: Faber & Faber, 2006)
