= Hepscott =

Village in Northumberland, England

Coordinates: 55.1543°N 1.6484°W

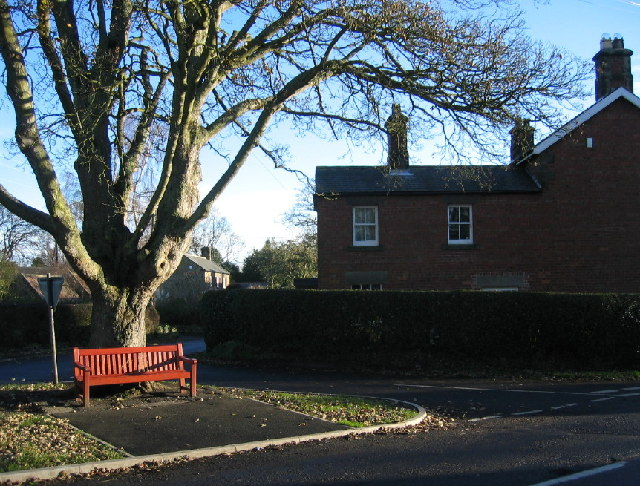
- Hepscott

- Location within Northumberland
- Population: 1,069 (2011 census)
- OS grid reference: NZ225845
- Unitary authority: Northumberland
- Ceremonial county: Northumberland
- Region: North East
- Country: England
- Sovereign state: United Kingdom
- Post town: Morpeth
- Postcode district: NE61
- Police: Northumbria
- Fire: Northumberland
- Ambulance: North East
- UK Parliament: Hexham

Hepscott is a small village in the county of Northumberland, England, about 2 miles (3 km) south east of Morpeth, the county town.

The name is Anglo-Saxon in origin and a derivation of "Shepherd's Cote". This suggests that the village, which was a hamlet prior to expansion since the 1980s, originated as the homestead of a shepherd, possibly in the early medieval period.

== Governance ==
Hepscott lies within the Ulgham Division of the new county-wide unitary authority, Northumberland County Council. The County Councillor is Cllr David J. Towns (Conservative), and the village falls within the Northern Area Committee's jurisdiction.

== Landmarks ==
The most historic building in Hepscott is Hepscott Hall, a three-storey, rectangular medieval pele tower. The Hall was associated with a deer park. The traces of part of the boundary wall of the deer park survive along the track to Field House Farm. Another historic building of importance is a smithy dating to the late 18th century that is a Grade II Listed Building. The heart of the community is the village hall, there are regular events and cultural activities including art shows, flower arranging lessons, wine tasting evenings and poetry recitals.

== Notable people ==
Notable residents have included football managers Jack Charlton and Gordon Lee
