= Dishforth Village Hall =

Historic building in Dishforth, England

Coordinates: 54°09′08″N 1°24′58″W

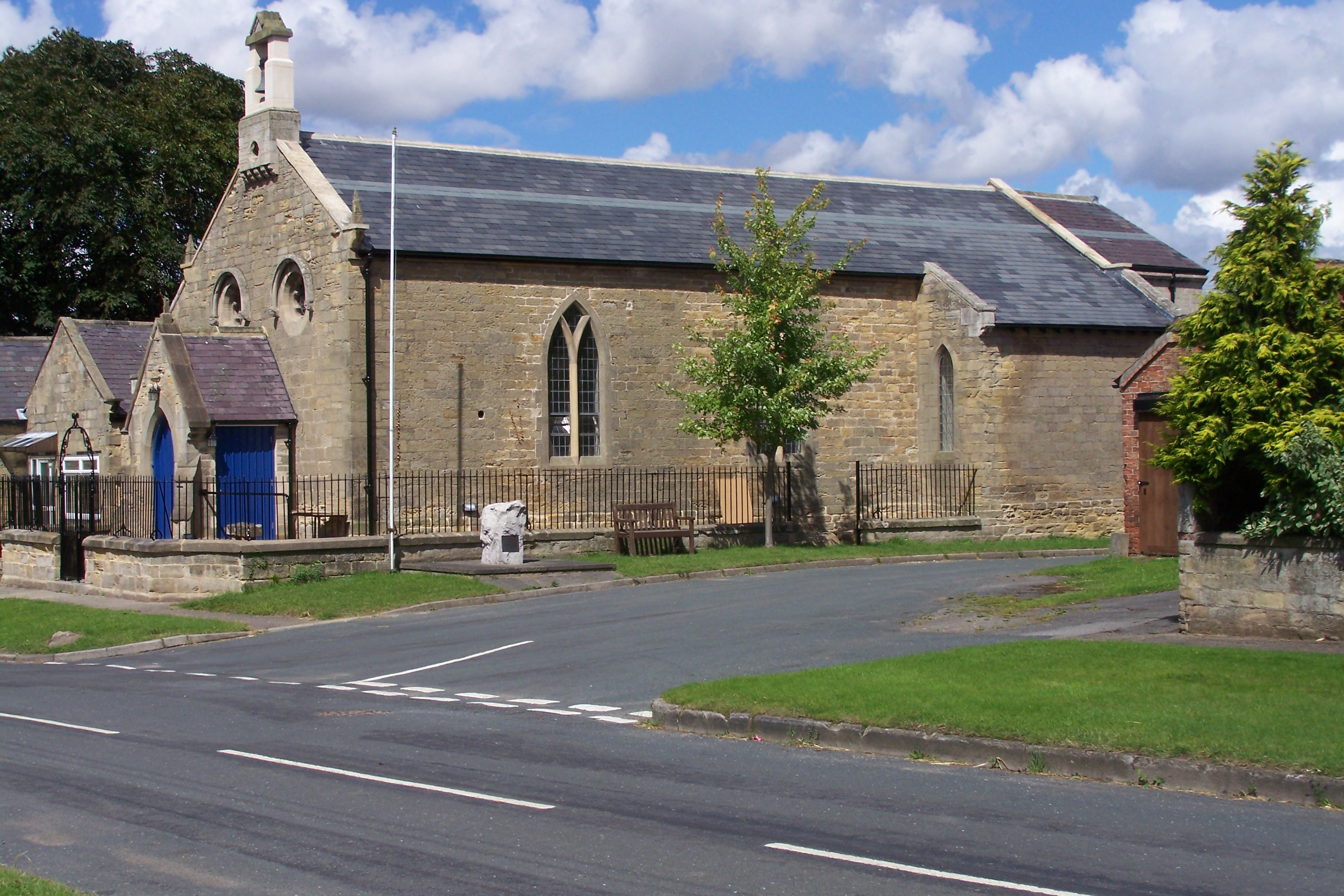
The building. in 2010

Dishforth Village Hall is a historic building in Dishforth, a village in North Yorkshire, in England.

Dishforth had a church in the mediaeval period, but it was entirely rebuilt in 1791, as a rectangular building, with a west porch, and an east gallery. From 1884 to 1885, it was restored and extended by George Mallinson of Ripon. The church was grade II listed in 1987. The church closed in about 2006, and was converted into a new village hall, replacing a wooden structure. The work was undertaken by Dishforth Parish Council, and included a new roof and floor, kitchen and toilets.

The church is built of sandstone, with stone slates on the body of the church, and grey slate on the apse. It consists of a three-bay nave, a west porch, a north aisle, and a polygonal apse. The porch is gabled, and contains a doorway with a pointed arch, above which are two oculi, and a gabled bellcote. Enclosing the forecourt on the west and south sides is a low wall with pointed coping and a wrought iron railing. At the entrance are gates, and an overthrow with scroll decoration and a lantern bracket.

== See also ==
- Listed buildings in Dishforth
