= Eshott Hall =

Country house in Northumberland, England

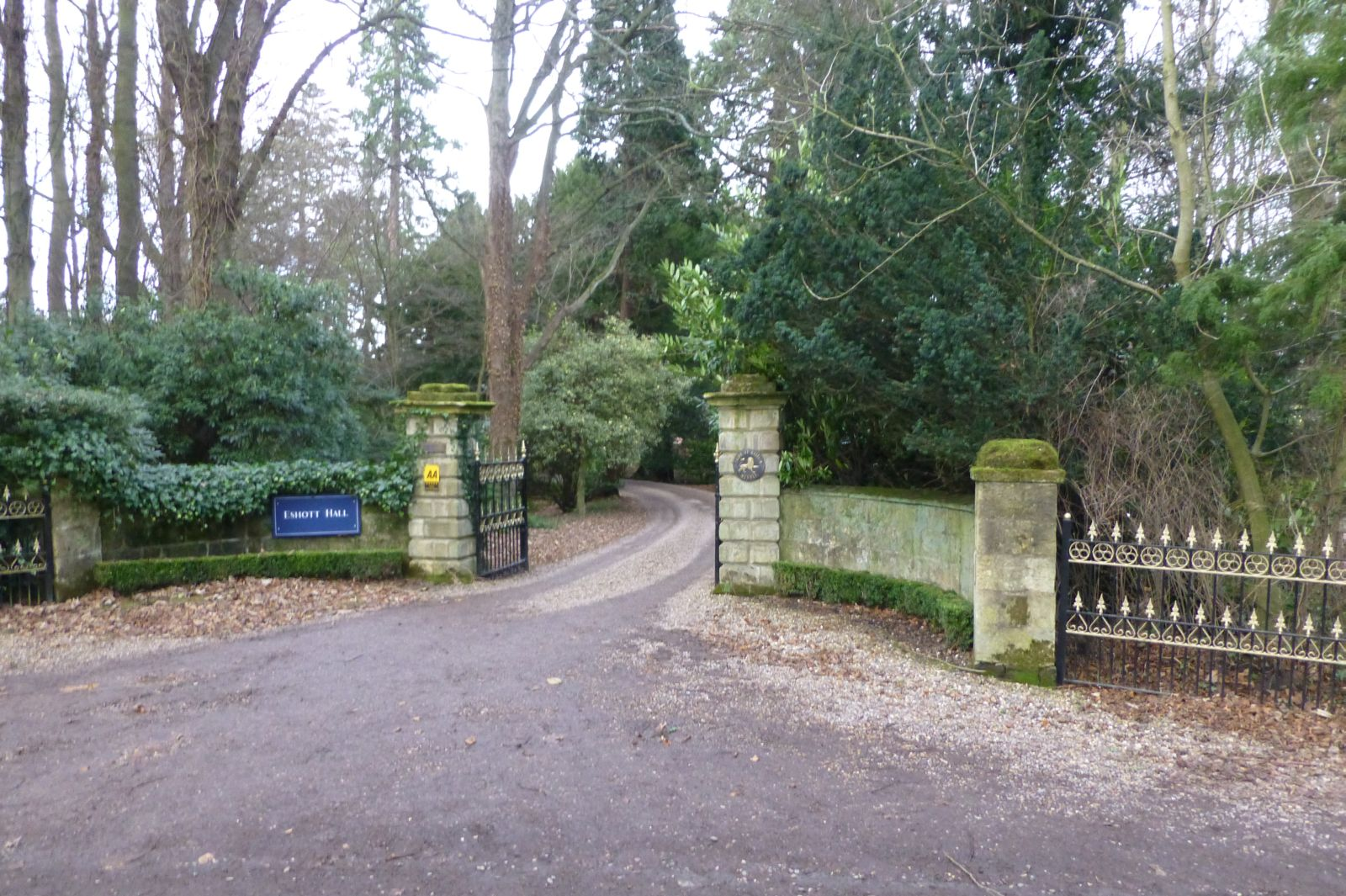
Gateway to Eshott Hall

Eshott Hall is a privately owned mansion house, a Grade II listed building, situated at Eshott, near Felton, Northumberland, England.

== History ==
Little is known of the first manor house at Eshott save that in 1310 Roger Mauduit was granted a licence to crenellate his moated house there and that the fortified and moated house was owned by Sir John Heron in 1415.

The sparse remains of the moat and some masonry footings have Scheduled Ancient Monument status.

In the mid 16th century, the Manor of Eshott passed to the Carr family of Etal, and in about 1660 William Carr built a new manor house to a Palladian style, designed by architect Robert Trollope, about half a mile south of the old manor house.

In 1792 the estate was sold to Thomas Adams.

In 1877, the hall and estate of some 1,800 acres (7.3 km^{2}) were bought by Emerson Bainbridge, the founder of the Bainbridge Department Store in Newcastle upon Tyne (which later became part of the John Lewis Partnership). In 1881, Bainbridge significantly enlarged and improved the hall.

The previous owner, Ho Sanderson, was a great grandson of Bainbridge. Beginning in 1997, he carried out major restoration works and brought the building back into use. It is now operated commercially as a stately home offering accommodation, weddings and conferencing. The previous owners were Robert and Gina Parker, who sold the hall to Wildhive UK Ltd in November 2024.
