= A1068 road =

Road in northern England

A1068

Route information
- Maintained by Northumberland County Council
- Length: 29.8 mi (48.0 km)
- Tourist routes: Northumberland Coastal Route

Major junctions
- North end: Alnwick; 55.4086°N 1.6940°W
- A1; A189; A197; A196; A193; A192; A1172; A19
- South end: Seaton Burn; 55.0656°N 1.6326°W

Location
- Country: United Kingdom
- Constituent country: England
- Counties: Northumberland
- Primary destinations: Alnwick; Ashington

Road network
- Roads in the United Kingdom; Motorways; A and B road zones
← A1067	→ A1069

The A1068 is a road in northern England that runs from Seaton Burn in North Tyneside to Alnwick in Northumberland. The section between Ellington and Alnmouth is signposted as part of the Northumberland Coastal Route.

== Route ==
The A1068 begins at a roundabout with the A19 road at Seaton Burn. It has a brief dual carriageway section before crossing from the county of Tyne and Wear into Northumberland. It is dual carriageway standard again past Nelson Village, and joins the route of the A192 road for about 1 mile (1.6 km). It continues through the town of Bedlington where it meets the A193 road and beyond the town it has a junction with the A196 road (to Morpeth). It joins the route of the A197 road for about 1 mile (1.6 km) close to the town of Ashington. It re-emerges and heads in a north-easterly direction until it reaches the roundabout with the A189 road. From its junction with the A189, the A1068 gains primary status and heads roughly north. It passes the coastal town of Amble and the villages of Warkworth and Alnmouth, crossing the River Aln at Lesbury before reaching the town of Alnwick. The road terminates at its junction with the A1.
