= Cockle Park Tower =

Tower house in Northumberland, England

- Northumberland, England
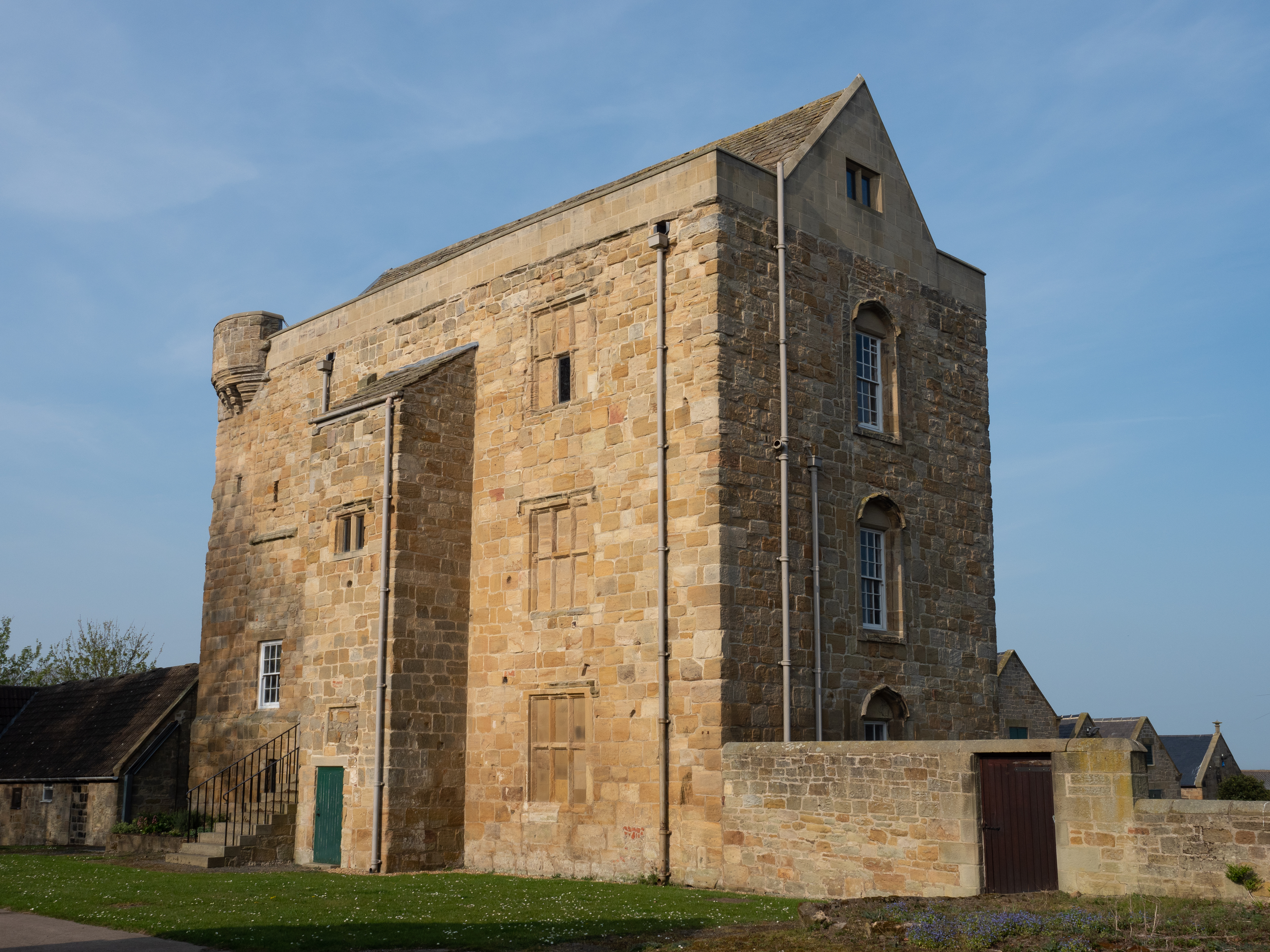
- Cockle Park Tower from the southwest

Location
- Location in Northumberland
- Coordinates: 55.213°N 1.684°W
- Grid reference: NZ202910

Cockle Park Tower is a Grade I listed building in the hamlet of Cockle Park, Northumberland, England, some 4 miles (6 km) to the north of Morpeth.

This three-storied tower-house was built in the 15th century as a hunting lodge and later extended by the addition of a domestic building. One end of the building has a pair of machiolated bartisans with a stretch of machicolation along the wallhead between them.

The tower was used as a students' hostel until the mid-1970s, at which time major structural problems became apparent. Newcastle University undertook major repair work in the early 21st century, as part of an overall plan for the development of their Cockle Park farm estate into the Centre for Renewable Energy from Land (CREEL).
