= Eshott =

Village in Northumberland, England

Coordinates: 55.271°N 1.679°W

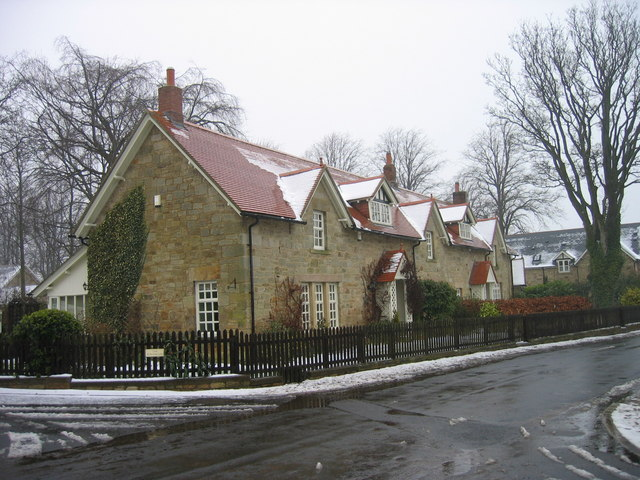

- Location within Northumberland
- OS grid reference: NZ205975
- Civil parish: Thirston
- Unitary authority: Northumberland
- Shire county: Northumberland
- Region: North East
- Country: England
- Sovereign state: United Kingdom
- Post town: MORPETH
- Postcode district: NE65
- Police: Northumbria
- Fire: Northumberland
- Ambulance: North East
- UK Parliament: Hexham

Eshott is a village and former civil parish, now in the parish of Thirston, in Northumberland, England. In 1951 the parish had a population of 114.

It is located 20 miles (32 km) north of Newcastle upon Tyne, midway between Morpeth and Alnwick. A small former RAF aerodrome, Eshott Airfield, is located there.

The nearby Eshott Hall is a listed country house hotel.

== Governance ==
Eshott was formerly a township in Felton parish, from 1866 Eshott was a civil parish in its own right until it was abolished on 1 April 1955 to form Thirston.
