= Nedderton =

Coordinates: 55.127°N 1.633°W

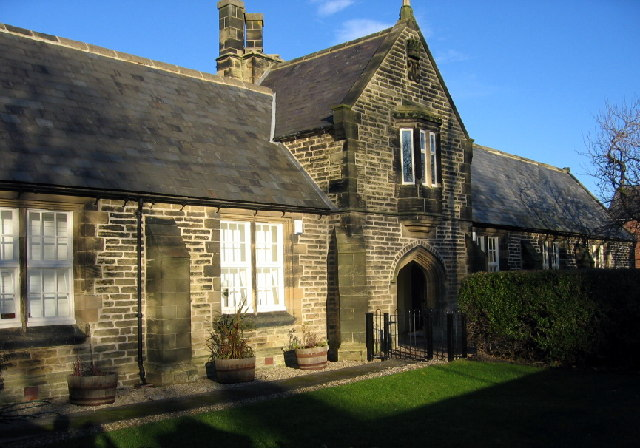
- Former school

- Location within Northumberland
- OS grid reference: NZ235815
- Shire county: Northumberland
- Region: North East
- Country: England
- Sovereign state: United Kingdom
- Post town: BEDLINGTON
- Postcode district: NE22
- Police: Northumbria
- Fire: Northumberland
- Ambulance: North East
- UK Parliament: Wansbeck

Nedderton is a village in Northumberland, England about 4 miles (6 km) southeast of Morpeth, just off the A192 road.

== History ==
In the early part of the nineteenth century Nedderton village was described as containing ten houses, a few cottages and a colliery. A Church of England school was built in 1846, funded by the Earl of Carlisle, though it seems many of the children preferred to attend Bedlington or Scotland Gate where the schools were non-denominational. The village also had both Primitive and Wesleyan Methodist chapels.

== Geography ==
The soil in this area consists of clay with a subsoil of freestone. Chief among crops produced at the beginning of the twentieth century were wheat, oats, turnip and potatoes.

== Economy ==
Nedderton Colliery was one of the oldest in the Bedlington area; it was sunk in 1818. The Howard West Hartley Coal Company leased the royalty from the Earl of Carlisle. Production increased through the nineteenth century, with around 280 to 300 hewers working and an output of 680 to 700 tons a day. By 1877 however it was no longer viable and the colliery closed. The site was taken over and again a pit was sunk, with coal being drawn by 1888. Nedderton Hall Pit was the last pit to be opened in Bedlingtonshire. It was first owned by a Mr. Wood, but by 1901 had been taken on by the Nedderton Coal Company. The pit was worked until 1943. It was closed during World War II by the Coal Commission, who could not justify the manpower used to keep it running during the war.
