= Kirk Smeaton =

Village and civil parish in North Yorkshire, England

Coordinates: 53°38′36″N 1°13′03″W

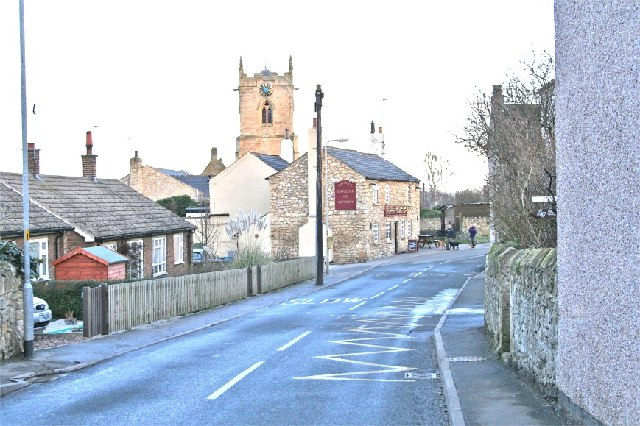

- Location within North Yorkshire
- Population: 405 (2011)
- OS grid reference: SE519166
- Civil parish: Kirk Smeaton
- Unitary authority: North Yorkshire
- Ceremonial county: North Yorkshire
- Region: Yorkshire and the Humber
- Country: England
- Sovereign state: United Kingdom
- Post town: PONTEFRACT
- Postcode district: WF8
- Dialling code: 01977
- Police: North Yorkshire
- Fire: North Yorkshire
- Ambulance: Yorkshire
- UK Parliament: Selby

Kirk Smeaton is a village and civil parish in North Yorkshire, England. It is located at the southern end of the county, close to both South and West Yorkshire.

Historically, the village was part of the West Riding of Yorkshire until 1974. From 1974 to 2023, it was part of the Selby District; it is now administered by the unitary North Yorkshire Council.

In the 2001 Census, the population was 344, which had risen to 405 by the 2011 Census and reduced slightly to 390 by the 2021 Census.

== Etymology ==
The name Smeaton is first attested in the Domesday Book of 1086, in the form Smedetone. This derives from Old English words smiþ (in its genitive plural form smiþa) and tūn ('farm, estate'), and thus once meant 'smiths' farm'. The kirk element of the name is first attested in 1311 and is a northern English dialect word for 'church', coming from the Old Norse word for 'church', kirkja. This element was added to the name to distinguish the settlement from nearby Little Smeaton.

== History ==
The village is mentioned in the Domesday Book, along with Little Smeaton, with the land being tenanted by Ilbert of Lacey. In 1840, Earl Fitzwilliam donated land for the foundation of Kirk Smeaton CE J&I Primary School.

== Geography ==
Kirk Smeaton and its sister village, Little Smeaton, face each other across the River Went, the most southerly boundary of the Celtic Kingdom of Elmet. A footbridge links the two, providing both villages with walks to Brockadale Nature Reserve and Wentbridge.

The North/South Yorkshire boundary lies close to the south of the village and, to the east, it begins to follow the River Went all the way to the River Don.

== Transport ==
A railway from the Leeds–Doncaster line past Drax power station used to run close to the south of the village.

Kirk Smeaton railway station opened in 1885 on the Hull and Barnsley Railway. The station was closed to passengers in 1932 and the line closed completely in 1959.

The village is served by one bus route, which is operated by Arriva Yorkshire; the 409 connects the village with Pontefract.

== Amenities ==
Kirk Smeaton CE J&I Primary School is a small school, with a mixture of new and old buildings, a sports hall and a community room. It has good links with the community and St Peter's Church. A pre-school class meets on-site in term-time; there are breakfast and after-school clubs.

The village pub is the Shoulder of Mutton on Main Street. There is also a Post Office, sited opposite.

== See also ==
- Listed buildings in Kirk Smeaton
