= Shilbottle =

Village in Northumberland, England

Coordinates: 55.3721°N 1.6915°W

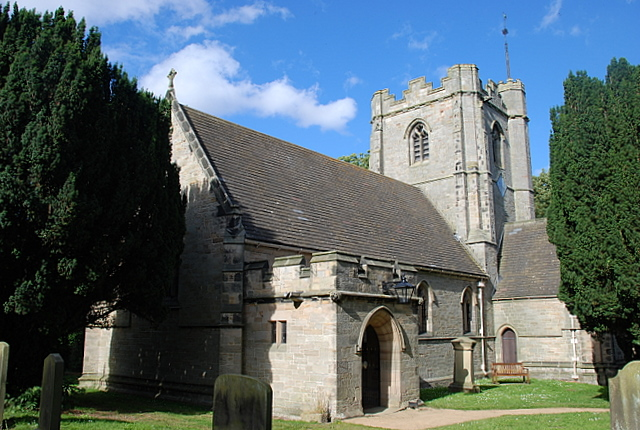
- St. James's Church, Shilbottle

- Location within Northumberland
- Population: 1,834 (2011 census)
- OS grid reference: NU2000208587
- Unitary authority: Northumberland
- Ceremonial county: Northumberland
- Region: North East
- Country: England
- Sovereign state: United Kingdom
- Post town: Alnwick
- Postcode district: NE66
- Dialling code: 01665
- Police: Northumbria
- Fire: Northumberland
- Ambulance: North East
- UK Parliament: North Northumberland

Shilbottle is a village close to the A1 in Northumberland, north-east England, 3 miles (4.8 km) south-east of Alnwick, and 5 miles (8 km) from the coast at Alnmouth.

== History ==
Coal mining began in the district around 1728; by the end of the 18th century six shafts were operating around Blue Lodge Farm (a.k.a. Colliery Farm). In the early 20th century, Shilbottle Colliery was bought for £50 by the English Co-operative Wholesale Society (CWS), a federation of consumer co-operatives, who upgraded the mining site: a new village of 170 houses was built, including some cottages for aged miners. Furthermore, Shilbottle Colliery was the only pit in the area where workers were given a week's holiday with pay, and a pension scheme. The National Coal Board took over after the Second World War; production continued until a decline in the 1970s. The pit closed in 1981, and the workforce transferred to nearby Whittle, Northumberland.

== Governance ==
The Shilbottle electoral ward of Northumberland County Council stretches south-west to Brinkburn with a total population taken at the 2011 census of 4,925.

== Buildings ==
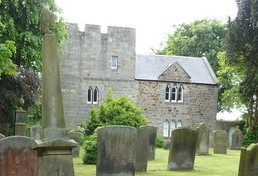
Shilbottle Tower

The local Anglican church of St. James was built in 1885, at a cost of £4,000. It is in the Early English style, but stands on the site of an earlier church; the church register dates from 1681.

Adjacent to the church is Shilbottle Tower, a three-storey pele tower built before 1415 and subsequently incorporated into the former vicarage.

== Village hall fire ==
Shilbottle welfare hall which dated back to the 1960s and served the community in a variety of ways burned down in September 2008. The welfare hall was mainly used to accommodate the cricket and bowls club and was also well used by the massive young population of Shilbottle as a youth club. Before the fire a fundraising event took place to raise money for a new hall for the community as the original structure was beginning to erode due to heavy use over the years and was costing too much to maintain. The total cost for a new hall included a big estimation for the demolition of the old hall. The local bowls club made an appearance on the front page of local newspaper 'The Journal' inside of the hall wielding umbrellas – underlining the state of the hall – appealing for funds. Weeks later the hall suspiciously burned down at approximately 2:30 am on a Saturday night. A member of the Shilbottle parish said it was down to 'a possible electrical fault'. Paul Andrucci, who lives right opposite the building and is secretary of the welfare hall management committee, said "Someone noticed some light in the hall's roof space in the early hours and alerted the caretaker, but by that time the roof was on fire. With the hall being mostly wooden it was just like a tinderbox, and within about half an hour to 45 minutes it was virtually gone". Shilbottle Parish vice-chairman Peter Brown said: "Whether it was water got in or whether the bad weather forced the mice back in and they chewed through the wires we just do not know.

"We are waiting for the insurance company to come up and say what they are going to do."

As of October 2009, construction work started on the new welfare community centre. An array of environmentally friendly energy technologies, including a wind turbine, ground source heat pumps and rainwater harvesting, are to be incorporated into the building, which will be constructed by Stephen Eastern Building, part of the Esh Group. It will include a main hall, multi-use rooms, kitchen and Sport England-approved changing rooms for the village's football and cricket teams.

Peter Brown, who chairs the Shilbottle Community Hall fundraising committee, said: "We're delighted with the design of the building."

Shilbottle Community Hall is now fully rebuilt and was officially opened on 12 September 2010.

== Graffiti ==
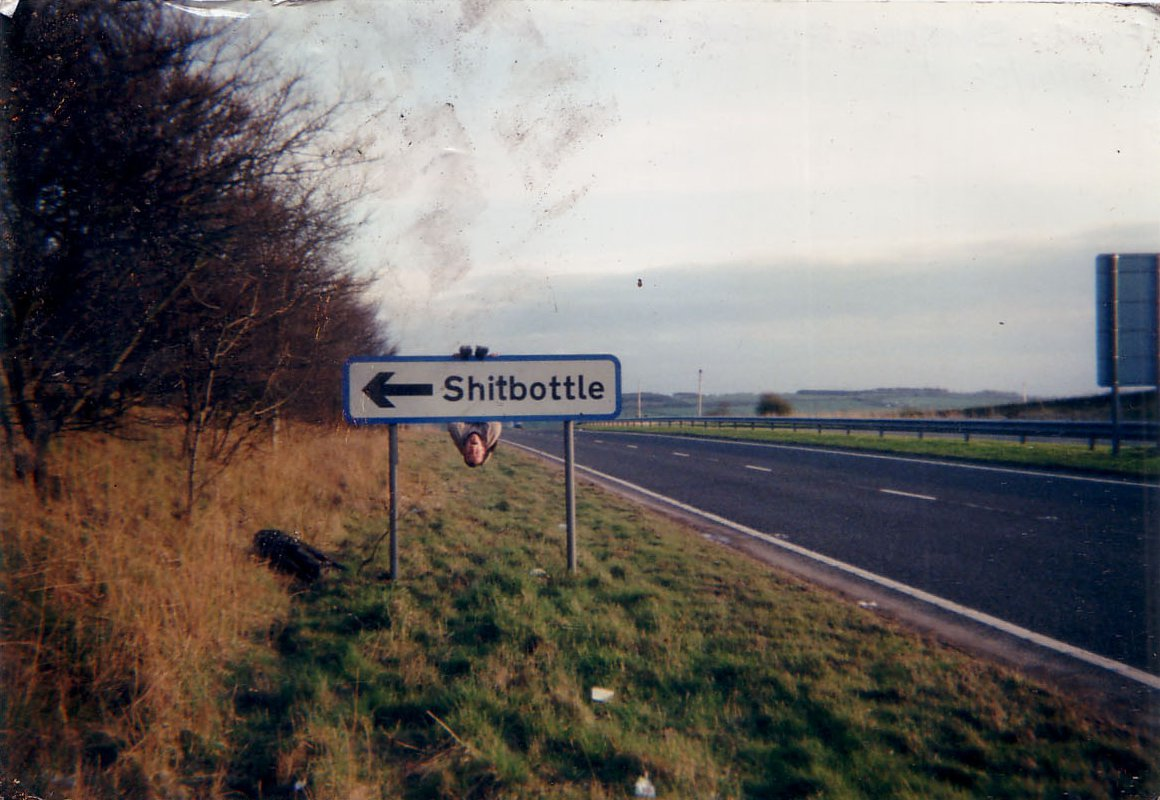
Road sign modified to say Shitbottle

In recent years, road signs to the village have been altered by the method of 'crossing' the first 'l' in 'Shilbottle' to make it appear as an 't', thus making it read as Shitbottle. Although signs have been restored and replaced over the years, this continues to be a problem. Comedian Stewart Lee made reference to this in an episode of Stewart Lee's Comedy Vehicle satirically claiming it as a marker of the human creative spirit – in decline due to the rise of the internet.
