= Tritlington =

Hamlet in Northumberland, England

Coordinates: 55.225931°N 1.6792214°W

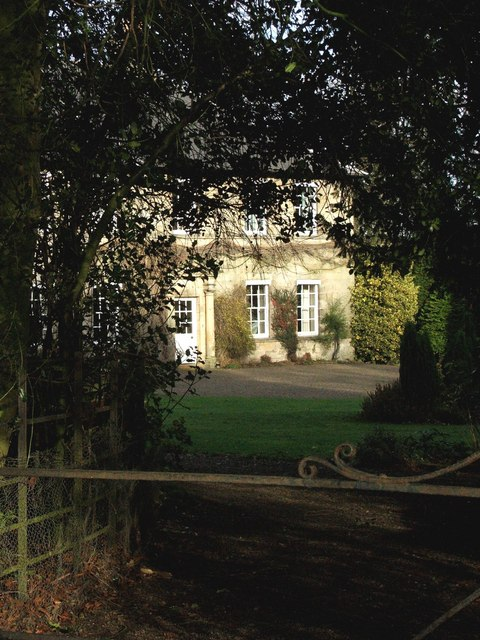

- Location within Northumberland
- OS grid reference: NZ2092
- Civil parish: Tritlington and West Chevington
- Unitary authority: Northumberland
- Shire county: Northumberland
- Region: North East
- Country: England
- Sovereign state: United Kingdom
- Police: Northumbria
- Fire: Northumberland
- Ambulance: North East
- UK Parliament: North Northumberland

Tritlington is a hamlet and former civil parish about 4 miles from Morpeth, now in the parish of Tritlington and West Chevington, in the county of Northumberland, England. Until 2009 Tritlington was in Castle Morpeth district. In 1961 the parish had a population of 216.

== History ==
The name "Tritlington" means 'Farm/settlement connected with Tyrhtel'. Tritlington was formerly a township in Hebburn parish, in 1866 Tritlington became a civil parish in its own right. On 1 April 1955 Causey Park, Earsdon, Earsdon Forst, and Fenrother parishes were merged with Tritlington, on 9 May 1995 Tritlington was abolished and merged with West Chevington to form "Tritlington and West Chevington". The parish councils were also combined on the same date, this was because West Chevington Parish Council was having difficulty in functioning due to its low population.
