= Fenrother =

Hamlet in Northumberland, England

Coordinates: 55.222364°N 1.7233586°W

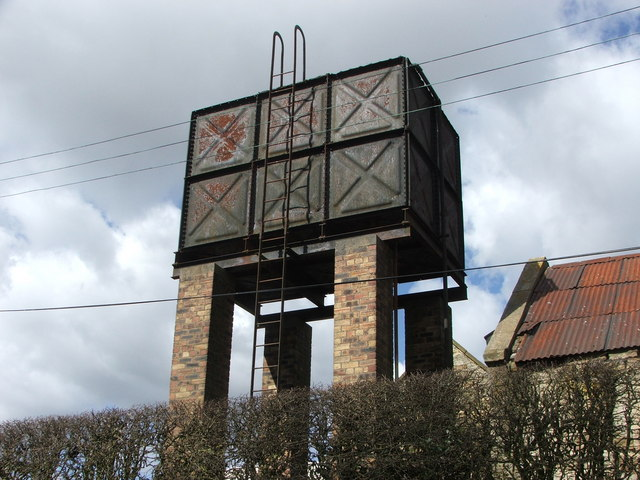

- Location within Northumberland
- Civil parish: Tritlington and West Chevington
- Unitary authority: Northumberland
- Ceremonial county: Northumberland
- Region: North East
- Country: England
- Sovereign state: United Kingdom
- Police: Northumbria
- Fire: Northumberland
- Ambulance: North East

Fenrother is a hamlet in the civil parish of Tritlington and West Chevington, in the county of Northumberland, England. It is 4 miles (6.4 km) from Morpeth.

== History ==
The name "Fenrother" means 'Heap clearing'. Fenrother is a deserted medieval village but there are now only 2 farms in the area. Fenrother was formerly a township in Hebburn parish, in 1866 Fenrother became a separate civil parish, in 1894 Fenrother became part of Morpeth Rural Diatrict, on 1 April 1955 the parish was abolished and merged with Tritlington. In 1951 the parish had a population of 52.

In 1974 Fenrother became part of Castle Morpeth non-metropolitan district. In 1995 it became part of "Tritlington and West Chevington" parish. In 2009 it became part of the unitary authority area of Northumberland when the 6 districts of Northumberland were merged into 1.

In January 2013 a controversial plan to build five wind turbines at Fenrother was refused by Northumberland County Council after an action group was set up to oppose it, it submitted a 71,000-word document with more than 1600 letters.
