= Ulgham =

Village in Northumberland, England

Coordinates: 55.2252°N 1.6329°W

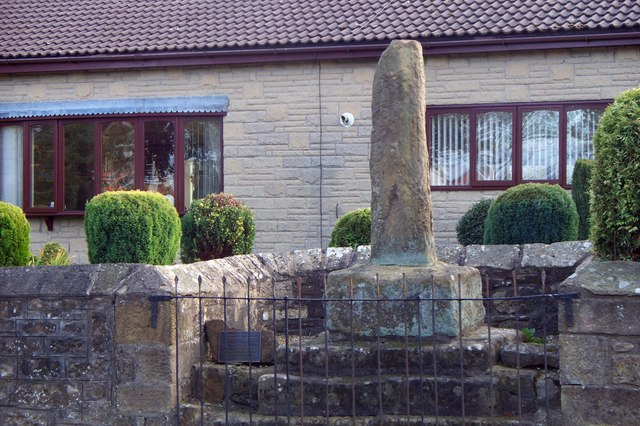
- Village cross

- Location within Northumberland
- Population: 365 (2011 census)
- OS grid reference: NZ234923
- Unitary authority: Northumberland
- Ceremonial county: Northumberland
- Region: North East
- Country: England
- Sovereign state: United Kingdom
- Post town: MORPETH
- Postcode district: NE61
- Police: Northumbria
- Fire: Northumberland
- Ambulance: North East
- UK Parliament: North Northumberland

Ulgham is a small village in Northumberland, England. The name Ulgham is pronounced 'Uffam': [ˈʊfəm] (locally), [ˈʌfəm] (RP). It is known as the 'village of the owls'.

== History ==
The name, first mentioned in 1139 as Wlacam, is from the Old English ūle "owl" and hwamm "nook (of land)", and so means "owl nook".

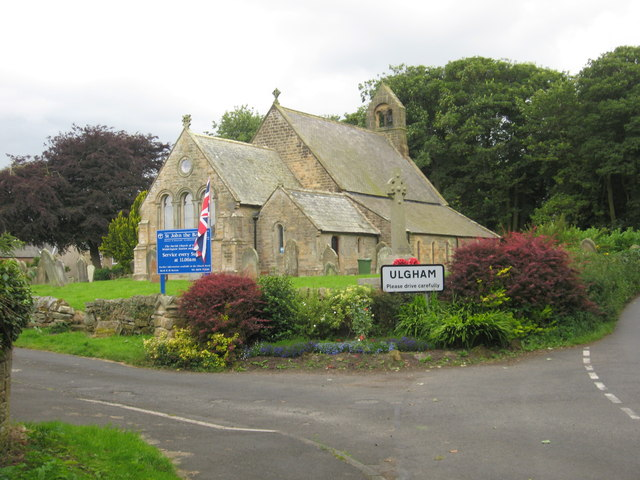
St John the Baptist

Situated about six miles north of Morpeth, Ulgham is a village combining old with new. The church of St John the Baptist stands at the top of a steep bank above the river Lyne, rebuilt in the 1800s. However, the site is Saxon and two Norman stone windows are built into the current church walls. In the north aisle is a stone relief of much earlier Viking or even pagan Anglian origin. The weathered nature of the stonework indicates that it has spent a significant length of time exposed to the elements, before being incorporated into the fabric of the present church. The churchyard contains tombstones from the 1600s – and one prior to the Spanish Armada of 1588.

The old village cross still stands in the main street, although it does not have a cross arm now, in front of two very modern bungalows. This is where markets were held during the plague in Morpeth. There is a small, modern estate where the pig farm used to be, opposite the post office, which was originally a one-storey building, when Ulgham was one street and three farms.

Notorious for being 'the village with the unpronounceable name', Uffam is believed to mean 'the place of owls', although there are other derivations. However, the destruction of the surrounding countryside for open-cast mining, and the disappearance of farm buildings and stone barns means that owls are seldom heard or seen.

In the middle of Park Wood, now neighboured by open-cast mining, grew the Ulgham Oak, where, it is said, whisky was once distilled illicitly.

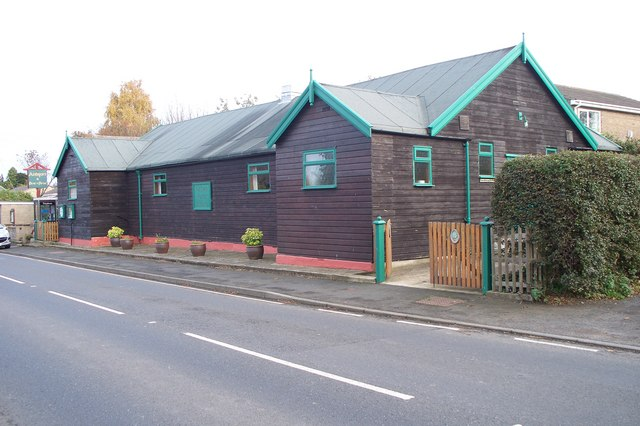
Ulgham Women's Institute

Ulgham has adapted well to changes in population. At one time a small farming community, it has welcomed newcomers but has managed retain its 'small village' identity. Flourishing associations include the Women's Institute, formed in 1924, and the cricket club, formed in 1977 and instrumental in the acquisition of the village playing field. The Ulgham Village Association monitors all aspects of life in Ulgham. It has published a village booklet and organises social activities from dances to footpath walking. The carpet bowls club has a large membership and provides entertainment for all, while the gardening club meets every month and arranges outings to gardens of interest throughout the county.

During the First World War the vicar of Ulgham gathered around him eager members of the village and they began play readings. These were held in the small village school (now converted to a residence). Much later, when the WI hut was built, the group moved to the new building and when a stage was erected short plays were produced. Eventually a county evening class for drama developed, the fees paid by members and the producer paid by the county, the members being recruited from the WI.

The class proved very popular and progressed to producing three-act plays. A play was produced each year, playing for four nights, Wednesday being exclusively for the over sixties. This was very popular and the hall was packed to capacity each night. The evening class rates were increased and travelling expenses rose and members had reluctantly to close the Ulgham Players. The pleasure and friendly entertainment they gave over many years still lives on in the memories of the people of Ulgham and surrounding district.

The village information above is taken from The Northumberland Village Book, written by members of the Northumberland Federation of Women's Institutes and published by Countryside Books.

== Governance ==
The village lies within the Pegswood Division of the county-wide unitary authority, Northumberland County Council. The County Councillor is Cllr David J. Towns (Conservative), and the village falls within the Castle Morpeth Local Area Council jurisdiction for planning and other local matters delegated by the county council. The electoral ward of the same name has a total population of 5,238. It is inhabited by Lord Astley.

== Notable people ==
The artist Luke Clennell was born in Ulgham village in 1781. He was the son of a farmer but he went to work in his uncle's grocery shop in Morpeth, and it was while he was there that his talent for drawing brought him to the notice of an influential peer who, in April 1797, had him apprenticed to Thomas Bewick at Newcastle. He became one of that great engraver's best pupils.

Clennell moved to London in 1804, having acquired much of Bewick's feeling for nature and a distinct ability for landscape and rural scenes. He went on to win awards from the Society of Arts for his wood engraving, but although his work revealed much breadth, it was uneven. Success, alas, affected his reason, and he died insane in 1840. There is a stone to his memory in St Andrew's Church in Newcastle, and three of his pictures are in the Victoria and Albert Museum, South Kensington.
