= Robert of Newminster =

English saint

Saint Robert of Newminster
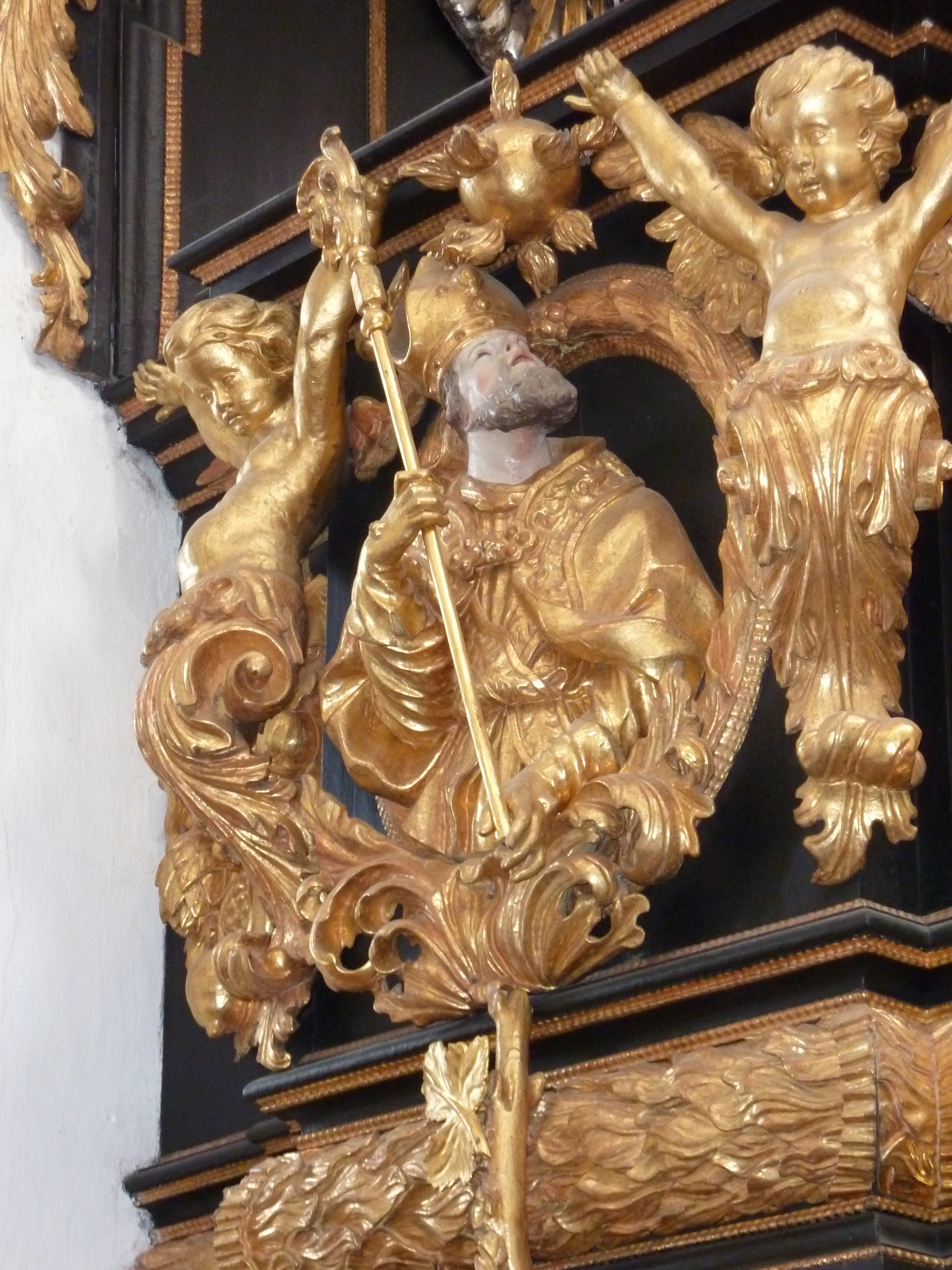
- Relief at the pulpit in the former Cistercian Abbey at Baumgartenberg, Austria

Confessor
- Born: c. 1100; Gargrave, West Riding of Yorkshire, England
- Died: 7 June 1159; Newminster Abbey, Morpeth, England
- Venerated in: Catholic Church
- Feast: 7 June
- Attributes: depicted as an abbot holding a church

Robert of Newminster (c. 1100–1159) was a priest, abbot, and a saint of the Catholic Church. He was born in Gargrave in Yorkshire, England. He was one of the monks who founded Fountains Abbey and is named from the abbey he founded in Morpeth, Northumberland.

== Early life ==
Robert was born in what is now the Craven District, near Skipton in North Yorkshire, probably in the village of Gargrave. He studied at the University of Paris, where he is said to have composed a commentary - since lost - on the Psalms. He became a parish priest, returning to serve Gargrave where he was made rector. He became a Benedictine joining the monks of Saint Mary's Abbey in York. A group of monks, including Robert, were expelled from York and established a monastery in a valley near Skeldale, on land given them by Archbishop Thurstan in winter 1132. The first two years were difficult and the monks struggled in extreme poverty. Initially they lived in a makeshift structure on the banks of the River Skell. Despite the hardships, the monks were known for their holiness, austerity and dedication to the strict Benedictine way of life. Their fame brought a new novice, Hugh, Dean of York, who relinquished all his wealth to the community, who built more suitable facilities. Because of the many natural springs in the area, the monastery was called Fountains Abbey. Fountains became affiliated with the Cistercian reform, which had been introduced by Bernard of Clairvaux.

== Cistercian and abbot ==
Robert was described as a devout, prayerful, and gentle man. He is known for being merciful in his judgment of others and a warm and considerate companion. He was zealous regarding his own vows of poverty. About 1138 he headed a group of monks sent out from Fountains to establish Newminster Abbey near the castle of Ralph de Merlay and his wife, Juliana, daughter of Gospatric II, Earl of Lothian, west of Morpeth in Northumberland. Abbot Robert was said to be favoured with the gift of prophecy and miracles. During his abbacy three colonies of monks were sent to found new monasteries at Pipewell in Northamptonshire (1143), Roche in South Yorkshire (1147), and Sawley in Lancashire (1148).

Capgrave's life tells that an accusation of misconduct was brought against him by his own monks. Robert was said to have had an interest towards a woman in the village. He went to defend himself before Bernard of Clairvaux in 1147–1148. Bernard did not doubt Robert's innocence as he had received a heavenly sign of his virtuous conduct. Doubt has been cast upon the truth of the story, which may have arisen from a desire to associate him personally with the greatest of the Cistercians.

Robert ruled and directed the monks at Newminster for 21 years. The small monastery of only 17 monks was one of the first to be dissolved in 1535 by Henry VIII, and the site has been privately owned since.

== Miracles ==
In one instance, a monk is said to have fallen unhurt from a ladder while working on one of the buildings. His tomb has become a centre for pilgrimage. Robert was a close spiritual friend of the hermit Godric of Finchale. On the night Robert died, Godric is said to have seen a vision of Robert's soul, like a ball of fire, being lifted by angels on a pathway of light toward the gates of heaven. As they approached, Godric heard a voice saying, "Enter now my friends."

Robert is often depicted in church art as an abbot holding a church.

== Veneration ==
Robert's tomb in the church of Newminster became an object of pilgrimage. His feast day is celebrated on 7 June, the day of his death.

== Legacy ==
A number of parishes are dedicated to St Robert of Newminster including those in Morpeth, Northumberland; Fenham, Newcastle upon Tyne; Ada, Michigan and Shorewood, Wisconsin.

St Robert of Newminster Catholic School in Washington, Tyne and Wear is named after him.

St. Robert School in Sacramento, CA is also named after him.

There is a St Robert of Newminster Parish and Primary School in Aberkenfig, Bridgend South Wales.

St. Robert Catholic School in Ada, MI, is a brand new Catholic school, that opened in August 2018. The school opened with 2, 3, and 4 year old preschool classes as well as a kindergarten class. Each year, the school will add a grade until it is full with preschool through 8th grade students.

== See also ==
- Catholic Church in England
- Saint Robert of Newminster, patron saint archive
