= Morpeth Clock Tower =

Grade II* listed clock tower in Morpeth, England

Coordinates: 55°10′03″N 1°41′28″W

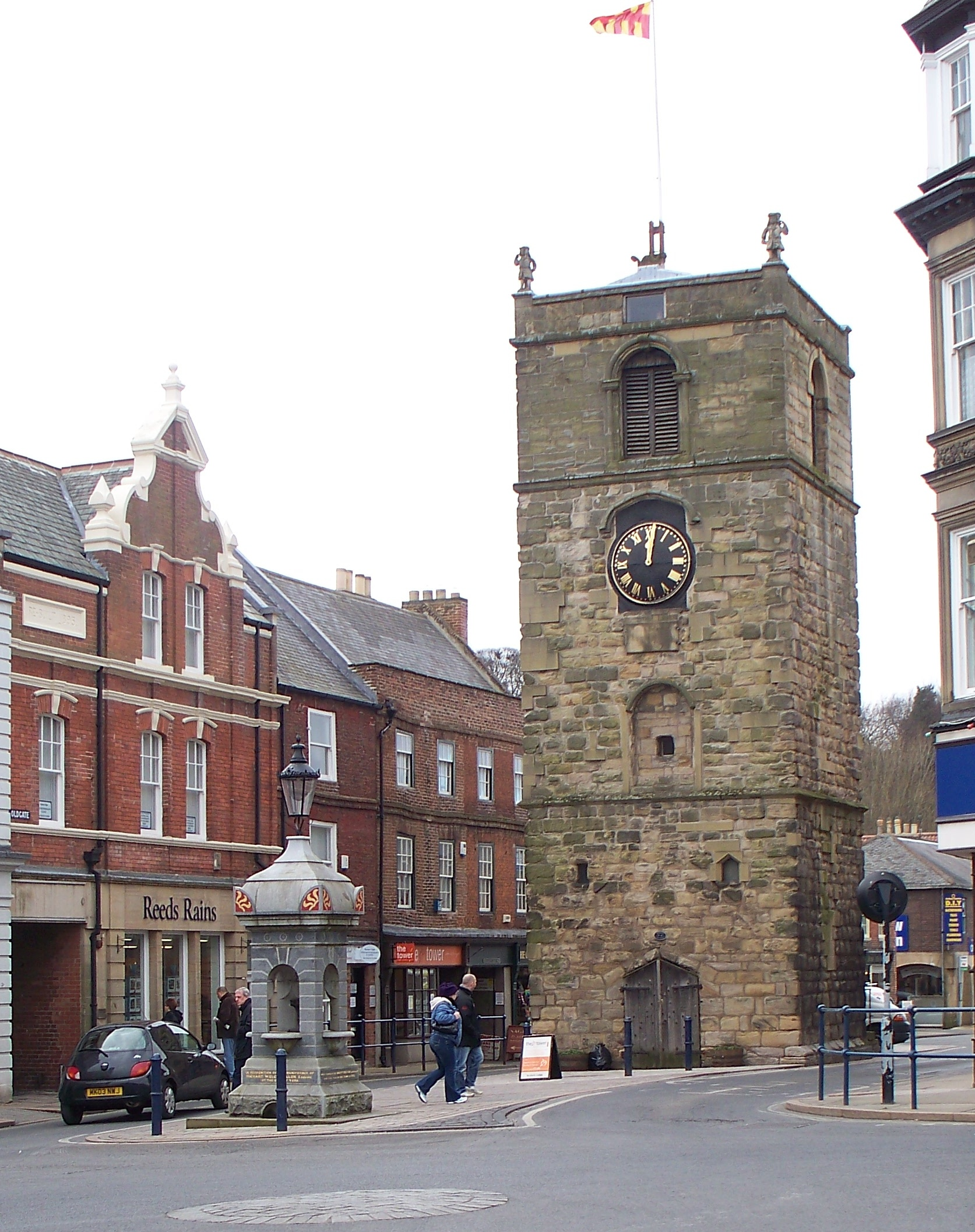
Morpeth Clock Tower

Morpeth Clock Tower is a building located off the Market Place, Morpeth, England. The tower stands 60 ft high with walls 3 ft 6 in thick. It stands close to the Morpeth Town Hall (originally designed by Vanbrugh in 1714) and the YMCA buildings of 1905. It is a Grade II* listed building.

== History ==
The Clock Tower was constructed sometime between 1604 and 1634 out of recycled Medieval stone giving it its much older appearance. The stone was thought to come from a gatehouse that previously stood at the west end of Oldgate. However, it is more likely to have been built out of stone from the nearby ruined Newminster Abbey which was dissolved in 1537.

The tower acquired a peal of six bells cast by the prominent bell founder Richard Phelps (of Whitechapel Bell Foundry) in 1706 at the request of Major General Edmund Maine, MP of Morpeth. These bells were originally intended to be made for the Parish Church of Berwick-upon-Tweed. However, the people of Berwick failed to elect the Maine to office as a member of parliament a couple of years previously. On his successful election as MP of Morpeth, the bells were presented to the Corporation of Morpeth. This gave rise to the curious local saying that "Berwick Bells are heard in Morpeth." To accommodate the bells, a top storey (belfry) was built in 1706. By the early 20th century, the bells had fallen into disrepair and were eventually recast and hung in a new cast iron frame in 1951 by John Taylor & Co to commemorate the Festival of Britain.
