= Carlisle Park, Morpeth =

Park in Morpeth, Northumberland, England

Coordinates: 55°09′52″N 1°41′26″W

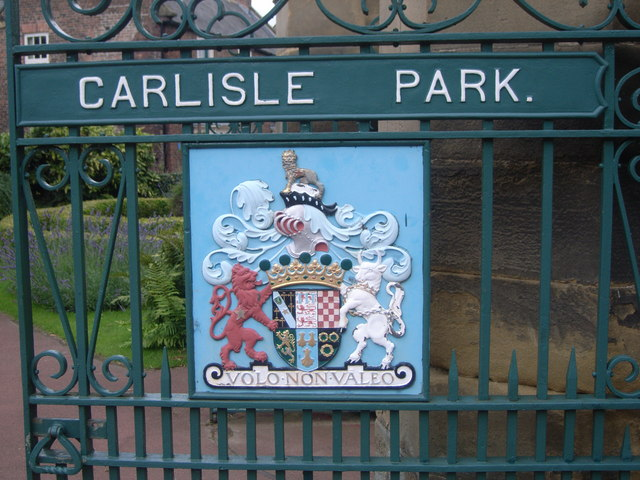
Carlisle Park and a coat of arms

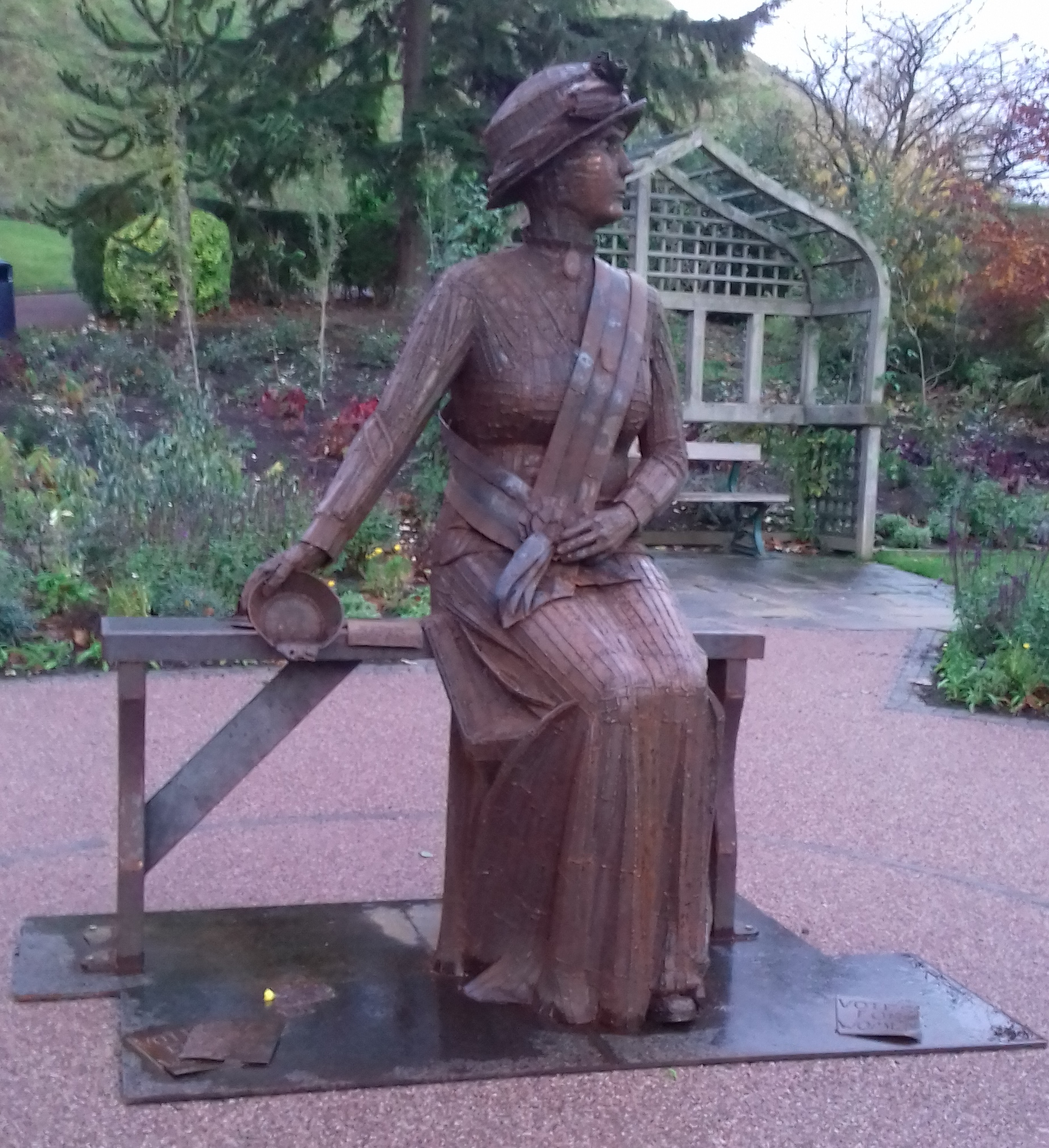
A statue of Emily Wilding Davison to commemorate 100 years since women could vote

Carlisle Park is a park located on the southern bank of the River Wansbeck in Morpeth, Northumberland. The park has the William Turner Garden, an aviary, a paddling pool, an ancient woodland, tennis courts, several bowling greens and a skate park. The park has one of the only four floral clocks in England, which was restored in 2018. In 2018, a statue of Emily Wilding Davison was erected in Carlisle Park, to commemorate 100 years since women were given the right to vote. The park has been awarded the Green Flag Award, the Love Parks Award in 2017, and 'Best Park' in Northumbria's in bloom competition in 2018.

== History ==
The park was opened on the 11th of September 1929, by the Earl of Carlisle, after formal gardens, cottages and general landscaping were completed. In 1951 the pavilion was opened and in 1956 the paddling pool was built. A floral clock was presented to Castle Morpeth borough in 1972 and is located on the south east of the park. The William Turner Garden, with separate aviary, was constructed with the help of a £2.1 million grant from Heritage Lottery Fund, subsequently opening in 1999. The garden commemorates the herbalist, born in Morpeth around 1508, who produced reliable and in depth lists on British flora.

== Structure ==
Ha' Hill, in the east of the park, is the site of the former motte-and-bailey castle built by the de Merlay family in 1095.
