= St Robert of Newminster Church, Morpeth =

St Robert's Church
- St Robert of Newminster Church
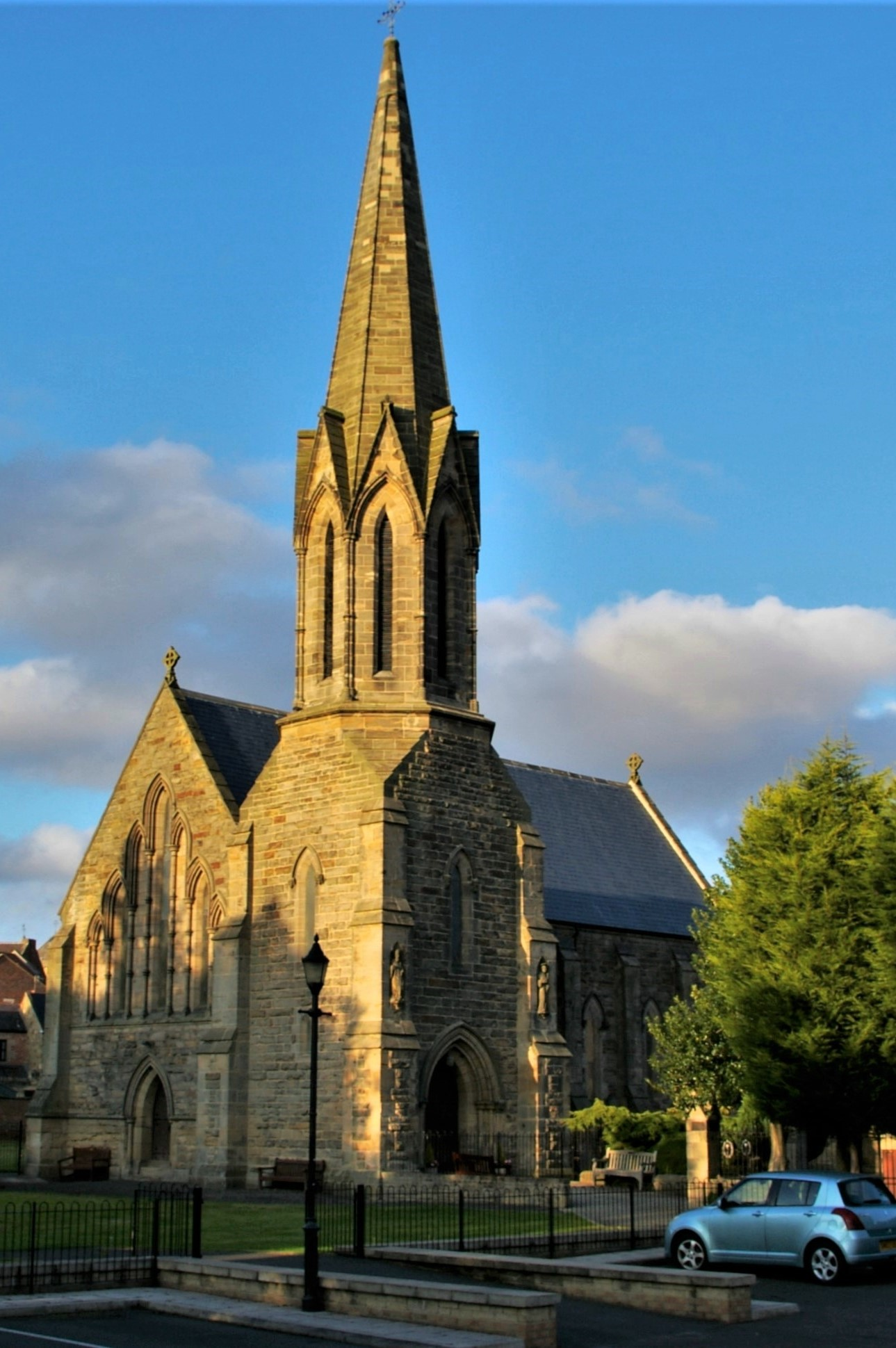
- St Robert's Church
- 55.1683°N 1.6924°W
- OS grid reference: NZ 19691 86041
- Location: Morpeth, Northumberland
- Country: England
- Denomination: Roman Catholic
- Website: StRobertsMorpeth.com

History
- Status: Parish church
- Founder: Fr Lowe
- Dedication: Robert of Newminster
- Consecrated: 1 August 1850

Architecture
- Functional status: Active
- Heritage designation: Grade II listed
- Designated: 22 August 1986
- Architect: Thomas Gibson
- Style: Early English Gothic
- Groundbreaking: 20 August 1848
- Completed: 13 September 1849
- Construction cost: £2,400

Administration
- Province: Liverpool
- Diocese: Hexham and Newcastle
- Deanery: St Benet Biscop
- Parish: Morpeth

St Robert of Newminster Church is a Roman Catholic parish church in Morpeth, Northumberland, England. It was built from 1848 to 1849 in the Early English Gothic style. It is located on Oldgate in the town, overlooking the River Wansbeck. It is a Grade II listed building.

== History ==
=== Foundation ===
From the mid-1600s, Catholics in Morpeth would worship in various places in the area. Jesuits would come from Longhorsley to celebrate Mass in Morpeth. In 1767, it was recorded that Catholics used a house in Bullers Green as a chapel. In 1778, a house that was situated opposite the current church was bought to be used as a chapel. It became St Bede's Chapel and had a presbytery next to it. Construction of the chapel and presbytery was £850 and it was paid by a Thomas Riddell from Swinburne. In 1779, Benedictines from Douai came to Morpeth and started to serve the mission in and around Morpeth.

=== Construction ===
In 1848, plans were drawn up by the priest, a Fr Lowe, for the construction of St Robert of Newminster Church. Fundraising started and on 20 August 1848 the foundation stone of the church was laid. On 13 September 1849, the church was opened and on 1 August 1850 the church was consecrated by William Hogarth, the Apostolic Vicar of the Northern District.

Decoration of the church took three years to do after its opening. The stained glass was done by William Wailes. The decorating was done by a Mr Gill. The rood screen was made by a local workman, Mr Manners. The church organ came from an old local chapel in Newcastle and was brought over by a Mr Davies. The total cost of the church came to £2,400, of which £1004 was contributed by Fr Lowe.

As there is no clear record, Historic England suggests four possible people as the architect of the church. There are original drawings of the church by a Mr C. Brown. A history of the Diocese of Hexham and Newcastle, Down Your Aisles (published 2000), credits Thomas Gibson who also designed St Wilfrid's Church in Bishop Auckland and St Osmund's Church in Gainford. The parish priest at the time of construction, Fr Lowe, credits a surveyor, Mr White, for designing the original interior furnishings. Also, according to Nikolaus Pevsner it is likely that Fr Lowe helped the design.

=== Developments ===
In 1857, the Stations of the Cross were added to the church. They were replaced in 1948. In 1860, statues of the apostles were placed above the stations of the cross. In 1864, the flooring was replaced and a heating system was installed. In 1869, a statue of Fr Lowe was added. In 1895, the church was redecorated by the Atkinson Brothers of Newcastle and was reopened after the redecoration by Thomas Wilkinson, the Bishop of Hexham and Newcastle. In 1898, a new baptismal font and high altar were given to the church by John Hedley, Bishop of Newport and Menevia who was born in Morpeth and lived in Collingswood House, which would become the presbytery. In 1904, electric lights were installed. Around 1920, altar rails designed by Sir Giles Gilbert Scott were added to the church. In 1965, a pulpit was installed and the church was again redecorated. In 1969, the Benedictines left the parish and the priests from the diocese came to serve the community and continue to do so.

== Parish ==
The parish is in a partnership with St Bede's Church in Bedlington. There are two Sunday Masses in St Robert's Church, at 9:00am and 11:00am.

== Interior ==
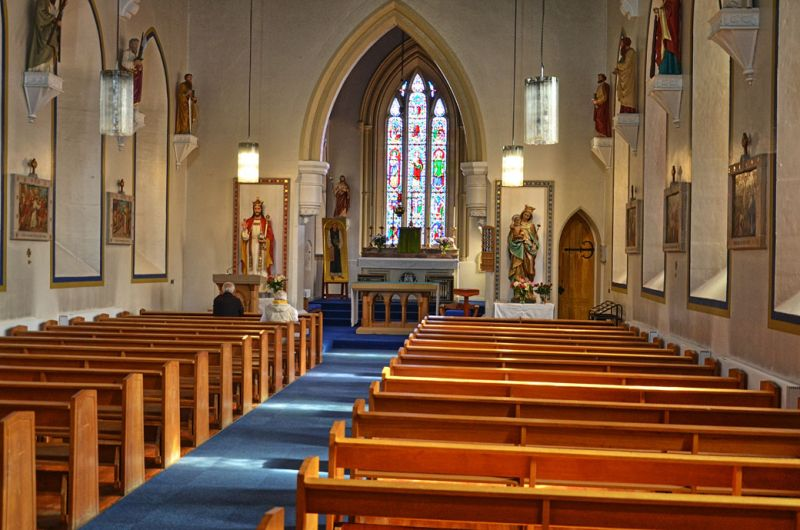
Interior

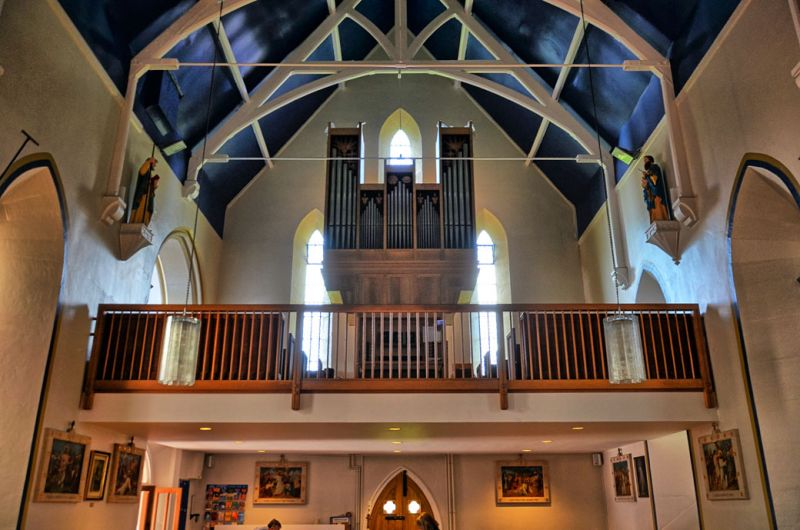
Organ

== See also ==
- Diocese of Hexham and Newcastle
- Media related to St Robert of Newminster Church, Morpeth at Wikimedia Commons
