= Haw Hill =

Mound in the United Kingdom

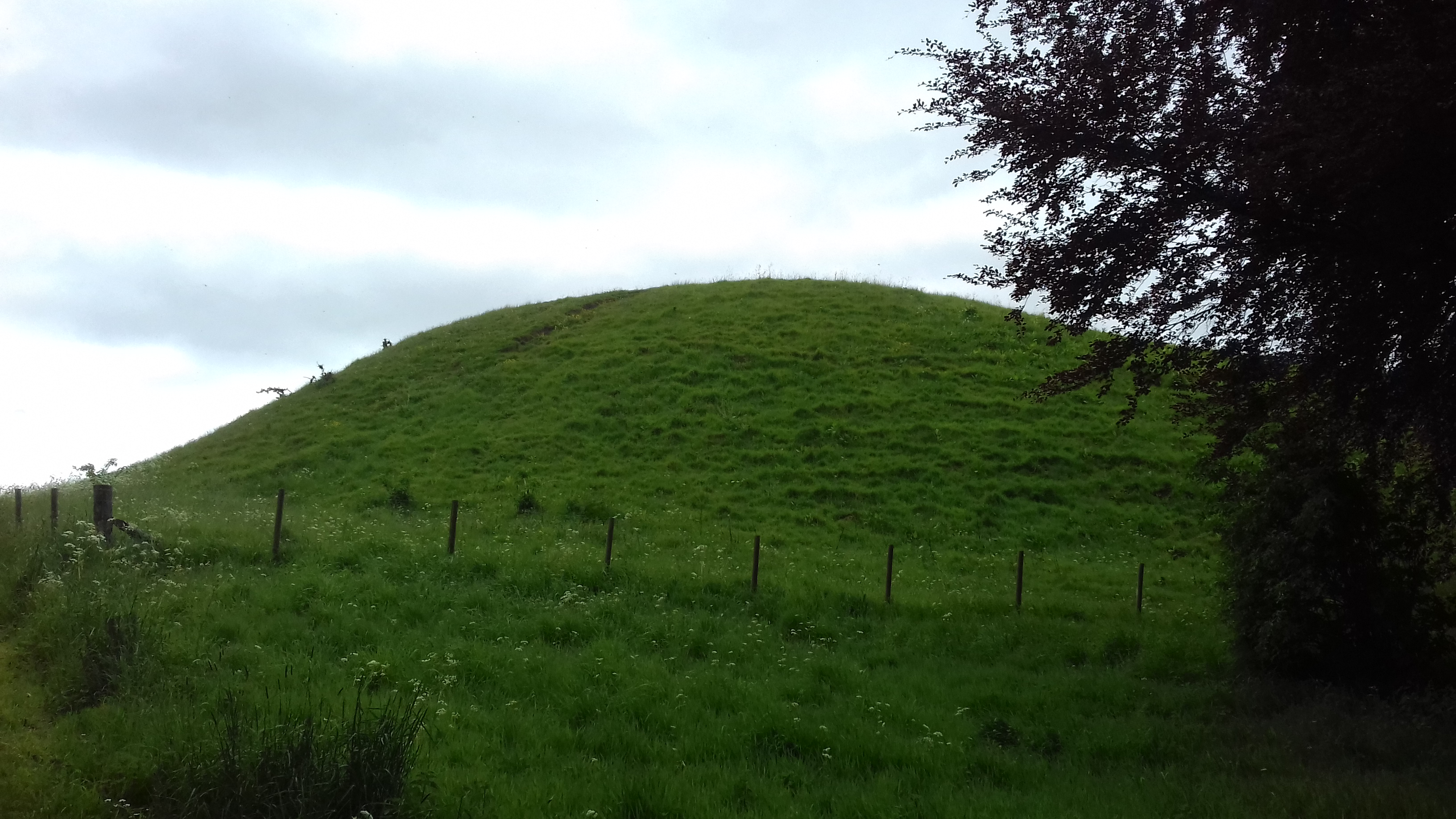
Looking up at the top of Haw Hill

Haw Hill or Ha' Hill is a mound and scheduled monument in Carlisle Park, Morpeth which was the site of a motte-and-bailey castle, being Morpeth's first castle. The castle was built by the de Merlay family in 1095, originally constructed as a wooden structure, being replaced later by a stone castle in the same location. The stone castle was burnt down by King John in the 13th century and the castle was rebuilt on the adjacent hill, which still stands today as Morpeth Castle.
