= Northumbrian Gathering =

Cultural festival in England

The Northumbrian Gathering is an annual gathering held in Morpeth, Northumberland celebrating the traditional culture of Northumberland and the wider North East region. The gathering is held over a weekend in mid April and celebrates music, dance, crafts and dialects of the county, including reenactments of famous events including battles, exhibitions, competitions and workshops. The Border Cavalcade and Pageant through the town happens ever year and draws crowds. The 50th gathering took place in 2017, and consisted of several traditional dances, workshops, musical performances, a barn dance and the Border Cavalcade and Pageant.
