= Morpeth, Northumberland =

Town in Northumberland, England

Coordinates: 55°10′3″N 1°41′27″W

Morpeth
- Town
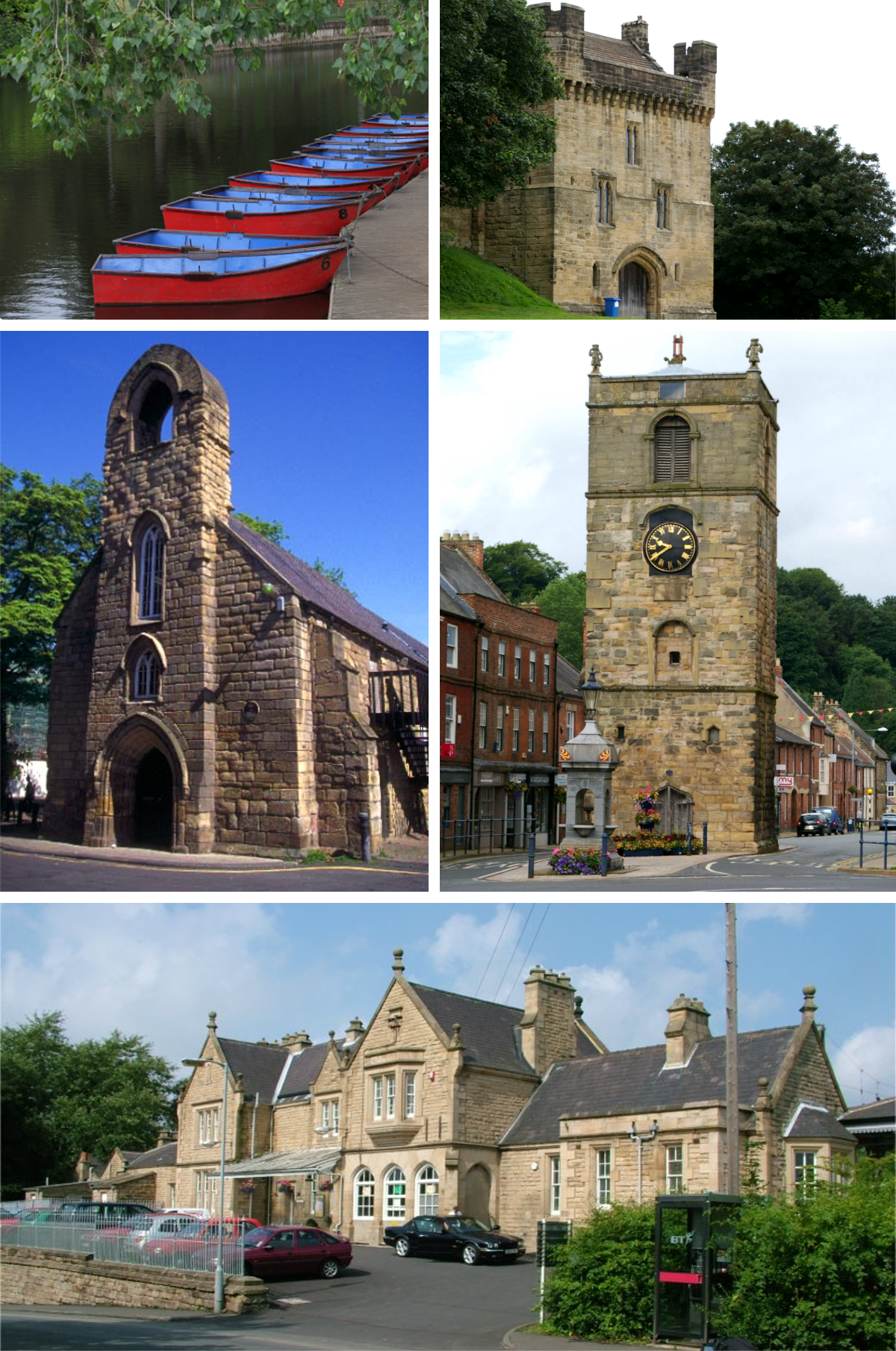
- Clockwise from top: River Wansbeck at Carlisle Park, Morpeth Castle, Morpeth Clock Tower, Morpeth station and Morpeth Chantry

- Location within Northumberland
- Population: 14,017 (2011)
- Language: English
- OS grid reference: NZ2085
  - Edinburgh: 80 mi (130 km) NW
  - London: 261 mi (420 km) SSE
- Civil parish: Morpeth
- Unitary authority: Northumberland
- Ceremonial county: Northumberland
- Region: North East
- Country: England
- Sovereign state: United Kingdom
- Post town: MORPETH
- Postcode district: NE61
- Dialling code: 01670
- Police: Northumbria
- Fire: Northumberland
- Ambulance: North East
- UK Parliament: North Northumberland

Morpeth is a historic market town in Northumberland, England, lying on the River Wansbeck. Nearby towns include Ashington and Bedlington. In the 2011 census, the population of Morpeth was given as 14,017, up from 13,833 in the 2001 census. The earliest evidence of settlement is believed to be from the Neolithic period, and some Roman artefacts have also been found.

The first written mention of the town is from 1080, when the de Merlay family was granted the barony of Morpeth. The meaning of the town's name is uncertain, but it may refer to its position on the road to Scotland and a murder which occurred on that road. The de Merlay family built two castles in the town in the late 11th century and the 13th century. The town was granted its coat of arms in 1552. By the mid-1700s it had become one of the main markets in England, having been granted a market charter in 1200, but the opening of the railways in the 1800s led the market to decline. The town's history is celebrated in the annual Northumbrian Gathering.

Morpeth is governed by Northumberland County Council and Morpeth Town Council. The town is split into three wards – North, Kirkhill and Stobhill – for the purposes of parish elections. In 2008, the town suffered a severe flood, which was repeated in 2012, resulting in the construction of new flood defences. Morpeth railway station is on the east coast line and a curve to the south of it has caused several rail crashes. Several sports teams compete in Morpeth, with Morpeth Town A.F.C. having been the winner of the FA Vase in 2016. The town hosted its own Olympics from 1873 to 1958. Two middle schools, a high school and seven first schools are situated in Morpeth, as well as several churches of Anglican, Roman Catholic, United Reformed and Methodist denominations. Morpeth's Carlisle Park, the recipient of several awards, contains one of the four floral clocks in England.

== History ==
Morpeth was founded at a crossing point of the River Wansbeck. Remains from prehistory are scarce, but the earliest evidence of occupation found is a stone axe thought to be from the Neolithic period. There is a lack of evidence of activity during the Roman occupation of Britain, although there were probably settlements in the area at that time. The first written reference is from 1080 when William de Merlay was rewarded for his part in suppressing a rebellion in Northumbria with "the Barony of Morthpeth stretching from the Tyne to the Coquet". The name derives from Old English morð pæð and literally means "murder path"; writing in 1666, the antiquarian John Stainsby attributed this moniker to "the many robberies and murders in those parts committed".

The barony of Morpeth was granted to the de Merlay family in around 1080, and by 1095 a motte-and-bailey castle had been built by William de Merlay. It is uncertain whether there was any settlement at Morpeth at the time that the barony was created, and documents relating to the foundation of an abbey in 1137 refer to the "new town of Morpeth". Newminster Abbey, located on the outskirts of Morpeth, was founded in 1138 by William's son, Ranulf de Merlay, lord of Morpeth, and his wife, Juliana, daughter of Gospatric II, Earl of Lothian, as one of the first daughter houses of Fountains Abbey. King John granted a market charter for the town to Roger de Merlay in 1200. It became one of the main markets in Northern England by the mid-1700s and by the mid 18th century was one of the key cattle markets in England selling cattle driven by drovers over the border from Scotland; however, the opening of the railways made transport to Newcastle easier in the 19th century, and the market accordingly declined. The market is still held on Wednesdays.

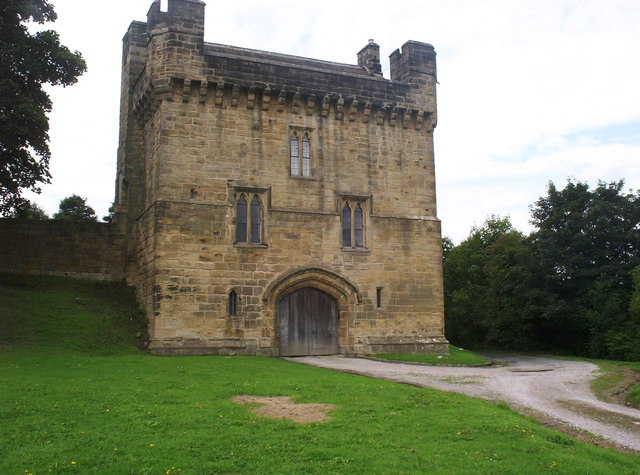
Morpeth Castle gatehouse

The town was badly damaged by fire set by the barons in 1215 during the First Barons' War, in an attempt to block the military operations of King John. Whilst it is common report that the motte-and-bailey castle was burnt down by King John in 1216 and a new Morpeth Castle was built later in the 13th century by Ranulph de Merlay, to the south of Haw Hill, there is no firm evidence that King John destroyed the castle and an alternative narrative suggests that the second castle was in fact "completed by William de Merlay (the 2nd) in the year of his death" (c. 1170). In the 13th century, a stone bridge was built over the Wansbeck in Morpeth, to the west of the current bridge, replacing the ford previously in use in Morpeth. For some months in 1515–16, Margaret Tudor (Henry VIII's sister) who was the Queen Consort of Scotland (James IV's widow), had laid ill in Morpeth Castle, having been brought there from Harbottle Castle. The only remains of the castle are the inner gatehouse, which was restored by the Landmark Trust, and parts of the ruined castle walls.

In 1540, Morpeth was described by the royal antiquary John Leland as "long and metely well-builded, with low houses" and "a far fairer town than Alnwick". During the 1543–51 war of the Rough Wooing, Morpeth was occupied by a garrison of Italian mercenaries, who "pestered such a little street standing in the highway" by killing deer and withholding payment for food. In 1552, William Hervey, Norroy King of Arms, granted the borough of Morpeth a coat of arms. The arms were the same as those granted to Roger de Merlay, but with the addition of a gold tower. In the letters patent, Hervey noted that he had included the arms of the "noble and valyaunt knyght ... for a p'petuall memory of his good will and benevolence towardes the said towne".

Morpeth was a borough by prescription, but received its first charter of confirmation from Charles II. The corporation it created was controlled by seven companies: the Merchant Tailors, the Tanners, the Fullers and Dyers, the Smiths, the Cordwainers, the Weavers and the Butchers. This remained the governing charter until the borough was reformed by the Municipal Corporations Act 1835. During the Second World War, RAF Morpeth, an air-gunnery training school, opened at nearby Tranwell.

The town and the county's history and culture are celebrated at the annual Northumbrian Gathering. The gathering is held over a weekend in mid-April and includes the Border Cavalcade and Pageant. The 50th gathering took place in 2017.

== Governance ==
Morpeth has two tiers of local government.

The lower tier is Morpeth Town Council, which has 15 members. Morpeth is a civil parish with the status of a town. For the purposes of parish elections the town is divided into three wards: North, Kirkhill and Stobhill, each returning five town councillors. Each ward also elects one County Councillor. In May 2021, the political make up of the Town Council was ten Conservatives, two Liberal Democrats, two Green and one Labour member.

The upper tier of local government is Northumberland County Council, which meets at County Hall in Morpeth. Since April 2009, the county council has been a unitary authority. Previous to this there was an intermediate tier, the non-metropolitan district of Castle Morpeth, which has been abolished along with all other districts in the county. The county council has 67 councillors, of whom three represent Morpeth, one each from the electoral wards of Morpeth Kirkhill, Morpeth North and Morpeth Stobhill. The 2017 and 2021 County Council elections both elected three Conservative councillors for the three wards.

== Climate ==
Cockle Park, located slightly north of Morpeth, contains a Met Office weather station, founded in 1897.

Climate data for Morpeth, Cockle Park (1991–2020), record highs and lows (1971–2000)
Month	Jan	Feb	Mar	Apr	May	Jun	Jul	Aug	Sep	Oct	Nov	Dec	Year
Record high °C (°F)	13.8 (56.8)	15.6 (60.1)	20.0 (68.0)	22.1 (71.8)	24.1 (75.4)	27.8 (82.0)	29.6 (85.3)	32.6 (90.7)	25.1 (77.2)	21.7 (71.1)	17.2 (63.0)	14.6 (58.3)	32.6 (90.7)
Mean daily maximum °C (°F)	6.6 (43.9)	7.1 (44.8)	9.1 (48.4)	11.3 (52.3)	14.1 (57.4)	16.9 (62.4)	19.3 (66.7)	19.0 (66.2)	16.5 (61.7)	12.8 (55.0)	9.1 (48.4)	7.0 (44.6)	12.4 (54.3)
Mean daily minimum °C (°F)	1.4 (34.5)	1.7 (35.1)	2.5 (36.5)	4.0 (39.2)	6.3 (43.3)	9.0 (48.2)	10.8 (51.4)	11.0 (51.8)	9.3 (48.7)	6.7 (44.1)	3.9 (39.0)	1.5 (34.7)	5.7 (42.2)
Record low °C (°F)	−12.0 (10.4)	−12.8 (9.0)	−8.9 (16.0)	−6.1 (21.0)	−2.7 (27.1)	0.1 (32.2)	3.3 (37.9)	2.8 (37.0)	0.0 (32.0)	−2.4 (27.7)	−9 (16)	−11.6 (11.1)	−12.8 (9.0)
Average precipitation mm (inches)	58.0 (2.28)	49.3 (1.94)	48.1 (1.89)	56.5 (2.22)	50.2 (1.98)	66.2 (2.61)	71.4 (2.81)	68.4 (2.69)	61.9 (2.44)	69.2 (2.72)	83.8 (3.30)	64.7 (2.55)	747.7 (29.43)
Source 1: Royal Dutch Meteorological Institute/KNMI
Source 2: http://climate-datas-weather.dynalias.org/

=== 2008 and 2012 floods ===
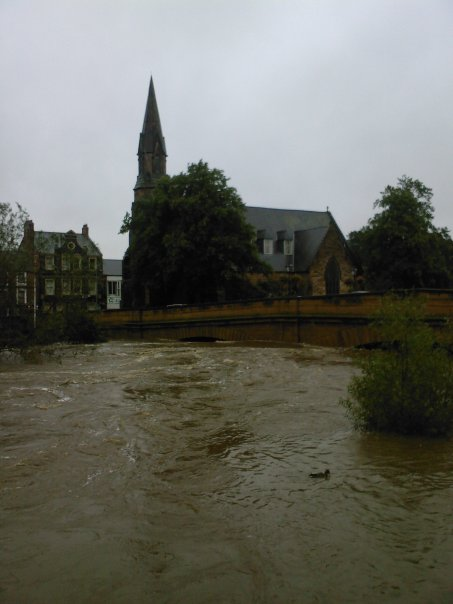
St George's Church and Telford Bridge during the September 2008 floods

On 6 September 2008, Morpeth suffered a severe flood, causing damage to 1,000 properties and leading 400 residents to be evacuated. The town's flood defences were breached after 12 hours, when a month's worth of rain fell on Morpeth.

In September 2012, flooding occurred again, causing damage to properties, although floodwaters were reportedly 3 feet (1 m) shallower than in 2008.

=== Flood defences ===
Work on flood defences started in 2013 in response to the 2008 floods. New flood defences were built in the town centre and a dam with a storage reservoir was built on the Mitford Estate. A second £27 million dam was completed in May 2017 to reduce flooding from the Cotting Burn and marked the completion of the Morpeth flood defence plan.

== Transport ==
=== Roads ===
The A1, the longest numbered road in the UK, used to pass through the town until the Morpeth Northern Bypass was opened in 1970. This was a project to decrease traffic congestion in the town centre and decrease journey times from Pegswood, Ashington and Newbiggin to the A1 and beyond. It follows on from the Pegswood bypass at Whorral Bank Roundabout, continuing to St George's Roundabout, Northgate Roundabout and St Leonard's A1 Junction. The project was completed in 2017, which has allowed increased connectivity to south-east Northumberland and beyond.

Other roads that pass through the town are: A192, A196, A197, B1337, B6343 and the B6524.

=== Railway ===
Morpeth's railway station is a stop on the East Coast Main Line, which connects London King's Cross and Edinburgh Waverley. It is served by five train operating companies: CrossCountry, London North Eastern Railway, Lumo, Northern Trains and TransPennine Express; these connect the town with destinations across England and Scotland.

To the south of the station is a sharp curve which has been the scene of several train crashes. A non-passenger line operates between Morpeth and Bedlington. A former line, closed in 1966, ran west from Morpeth to Scots Gap (from where there was a branch line to Rothbury), then west to Redesmouth and lastly south to Hexham.

=== Buses ===
Arriva North East is the main operator of bus services in the town, with services connecting the town with Pegswood, Guide Post, Ashington, Bedlington, Newcastle, Alnwick, Amble, Berwick and Widdrington.

== Education ==
The local state school, King Edward VI School, was originally founded as a chantry school in the early 14th century and was located in the Morpeth Chantry. The school was refounded in 1552 by royal charter as the Free Grammar School of King Edward the Sixth, being commonly referred to as the Morpeth Grammar School by locals. The school was renamed to King Edward VI Grammar School by 1947 and in the 1970s lost its grammar-school status, becoming a comprehensive under the current name.

The town has two middle schools, Newminster and Chantry, which are built next to each other. It also has several first schools: Abbeyfields First School in Kirkhill, Morpeth First School in Loansdean to the south of the town, Stobhillgate First School in the Stobhillgate housing estate, and Morpeth All Saints' Church of England-aided First School in Lancaster Park, north of the town. Additionally, St. Robert's R.C. First School, a primary school for Roman Catholics, is located in Oldgate, Morpeth.

== Religious sites ==
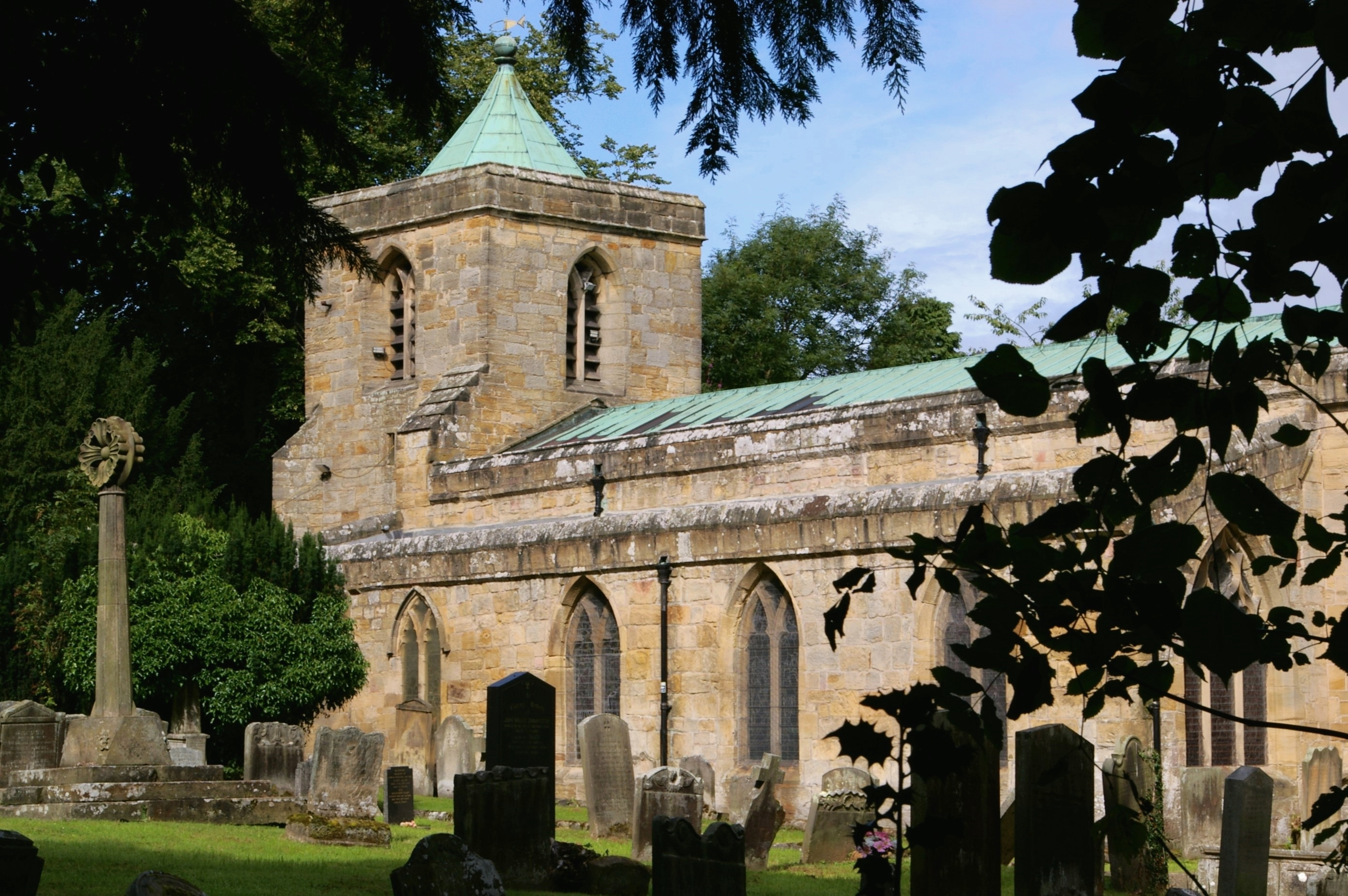
The ancient parish church of St Mary the Virgin

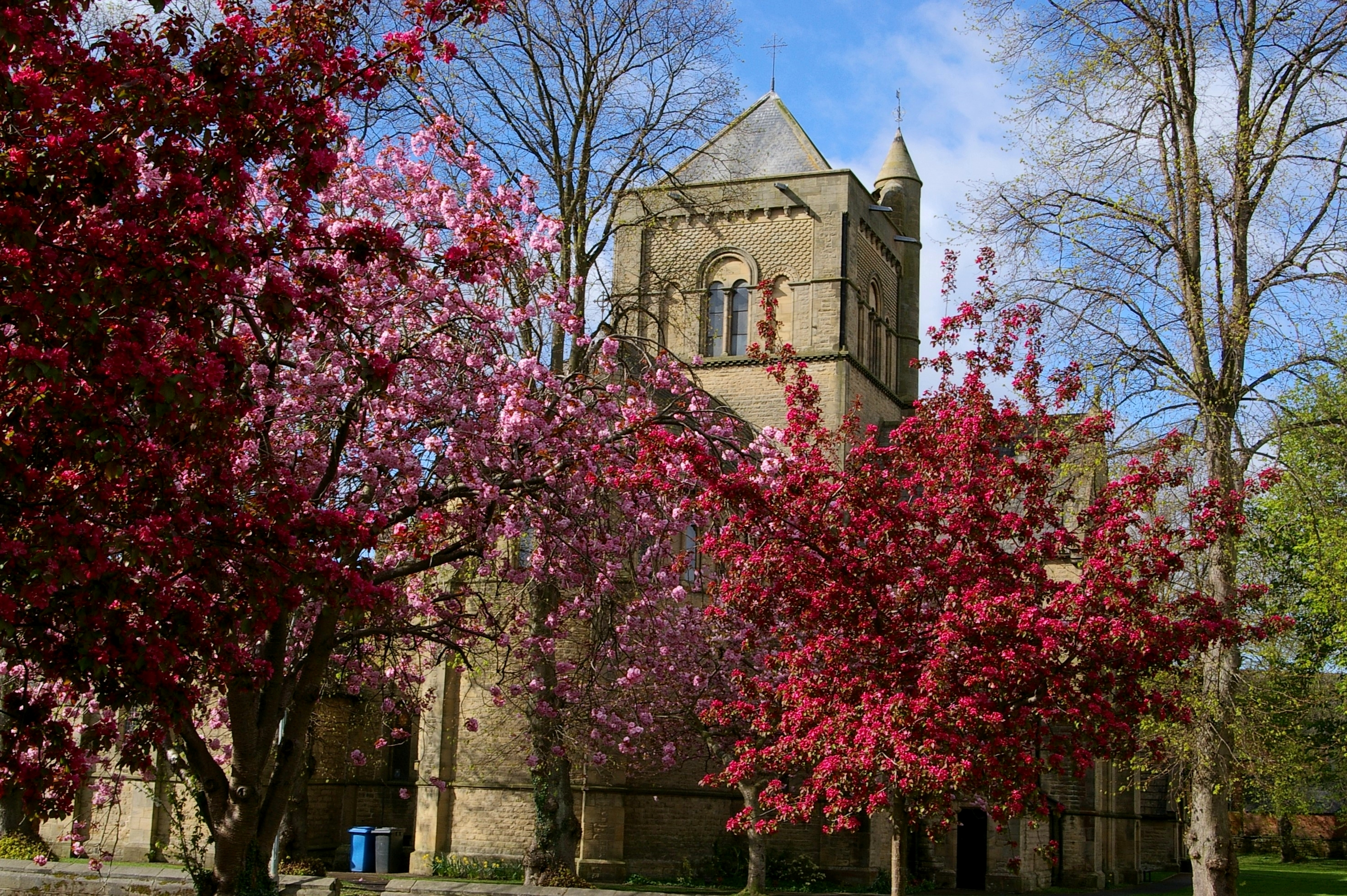
Church of St James the Great, built by the architect Benjamin Ferrey in 1846

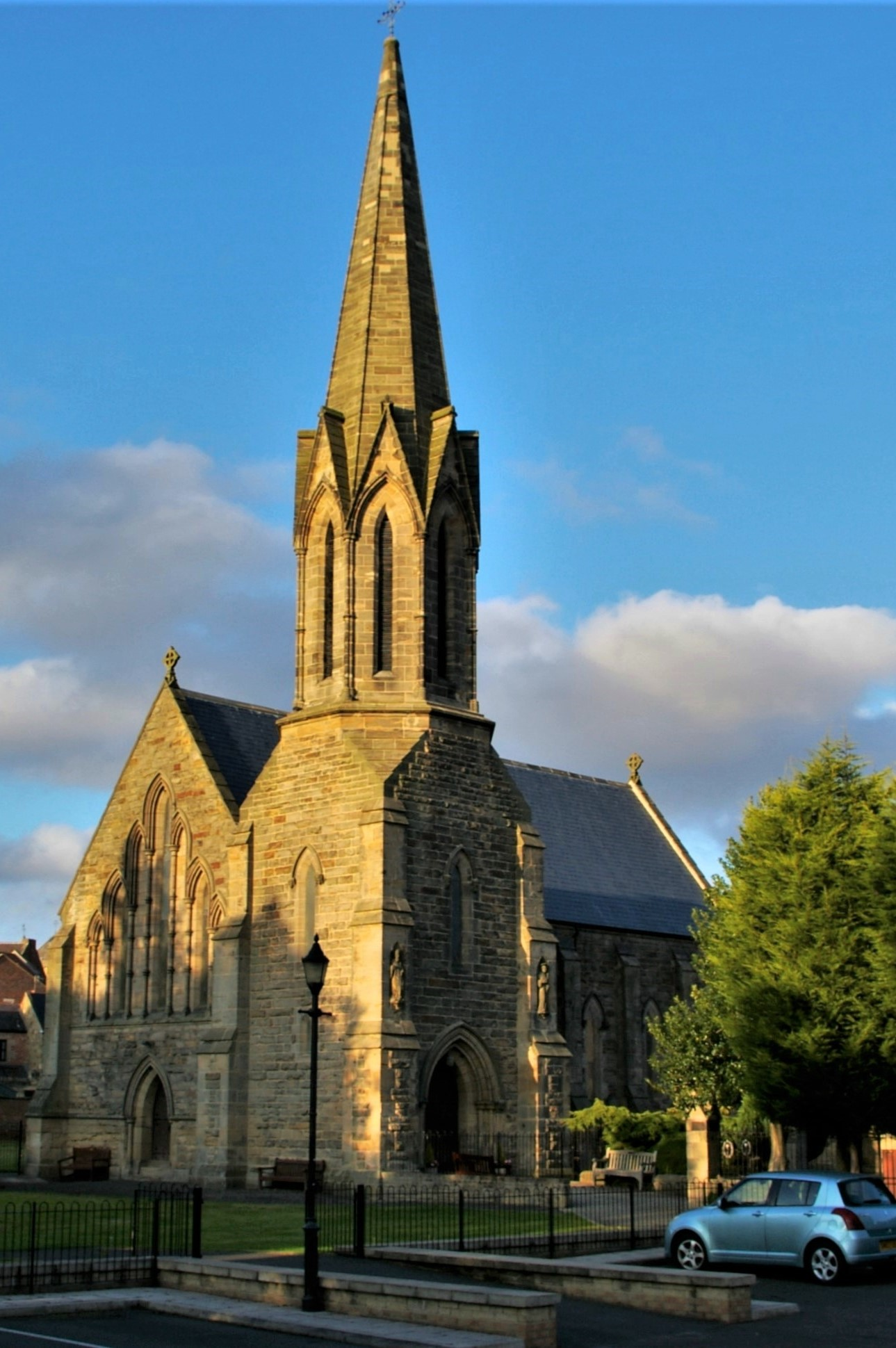
St Robert of Newminster Roman Catholic Church, consecrated 1 August 1850

=== Church of England ===
The ancient Church of England parish church of Morpeth is St Mary's at High Church, which was the main Anglican place of worship in the area until the 1840s. The church is mostly in the 14th-century style. The grave of the suffragette Emily Wilding Davison lies in St Mary's graveyard.

In 1843 a public meeting was called to address the lack of attendance at the church, and it was found that the walk to the current church, then on the southern edge of the town, was too much for many of the parishioners. As a result of this meeting it was decided to build a new church in the town centre and accordingly the church of St James the Great was consecrated for worship on 15 October 1846. Benjamin Ferrey designed the church in a "Neo-Norman" style, based on the 12th-century Monreale Cathedral, Sicily.

A third parish church, St Aidan's, was founded as a mission church in 1957, on the Stobhill estate on the south-east of the town.

=== Roman Catholic Church ===
Morpeth's Roman Catholic Church, St Robert of Newminster Church, was built off Oldgate on land adjacent to Admiral Lord Collingwood's house. It was consecrated on 1 August 1850 by the Right Reverend William Hogarth, Bishop of Samosata (later Bishop of Hexham). Collingwood House is now the presbytery (residence) for the priest in charge.

=== United Reformed Church ===
Morpeth has had a Presbyterian ministry since 1693. Their first service was held in a tannery loft in the town in February 1693 and in 1721 a chapel was built in Cottingwood Lane, which still exists as a private home. The construction of St. George's United Reformed Church began in 1858 and the first service in the new building was held on 12 April 1860. The Church stands immediately to the north of the Telford Bridge and is in the style of the early English era, containing a stained glass rose window and an octagonal spirelet.

=== Methodist Church ===
The present Methodist Church in Howard Terrace was opened as a Primitive Methodist place of worship on 24 April 1905. Designed by J. Walton Taylor, it was built from local quarry stone. Although the Primitive Methodists were united with the Wesleyan Church to form the Methodist Church of Great Britain in 1932, a separate Wesleyan Church continued to function in Manchester Street until 1964, when the congregations were united at Howard Terrace. The former Wesleyan Church (built in 1883) is currently used as the Explorer Scout headquarters.

== Sport ==
Morpeth Town A.F.C., Morpeth RFC and the Morpeth Golf Club play competitively within Morpeth. In addition, the Morpeth Harriers compete in athletics. The town also offers opportunities to play sport on a non-competitive basis through facilities such as Carlisle Park, the common for playing golf and football, and the Riverside leisure centre for swimming, indoor sports and fitness gym activities. Morpeth Town A.F.C. was the 2016 winner of the FA Vase.

The Morpeth Olympic Games, a professional event consisting mainly of athletics and wrestling, were staged from 1873 until 1958, barring interruptions during the two world wars. The Games were held on the Old Brewery Field until 1896, then at Grange House Field until the First World War. After two years at the town's cricket pitch at Stobhill (1919–20), the Olympics moved to Mount Haggs Field until 1939, and then back to Grange House Field after the war until the end of the games in 1958.

In 1730, a racecourse was built for horse racing, which was used until 1854, when the racetrack was replaced with St. George's Hospital.

The town was the start point of the Morpeth To Newcastle Road Race. This road running race was held annually on New Year's Day from 1902 to 2004, when insurance and policing costs became prohibitively high, and winners included Commonwealth champion Jack Holden and Olympic medallist Mike McLeod.

== Media ==
Local news and television programmes are provided by BBC North East and Cumbria and ITV Tyne Tees. Television signals are received from the Pontop Pike and local relay transmitters.

Local radio stations are BBC Radio Newcastle, Capital North East, Heart North East, Smooth North East, Hits Radio North East, and Koast Radio, a community based radio station.

The Morpeth Herald is the town's local weekly newspaper.

== Landmarks ==
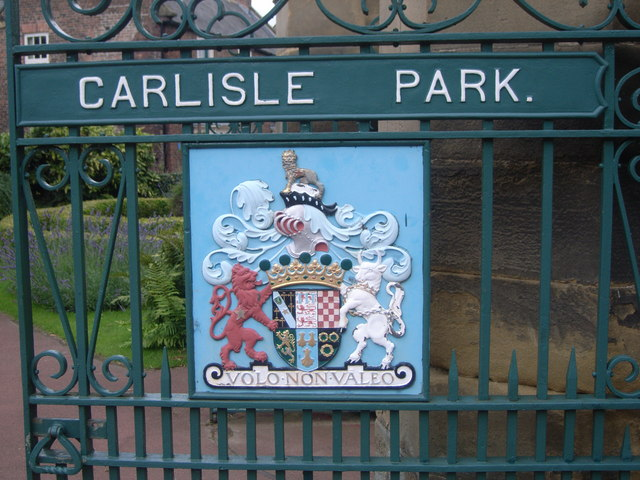
Carlisle Park and a coat of arms

The historical layout of central Morpeth consisted of Bridge Street, Oldgate Street and Newgate Street, with burgage plots leading off them. Traces of this layout remain: Old Bakehouse Yard off Newgate Street is a former burgage plot, as is Pretoria Avenue, off Oldgate. The town stands right on what used to be the Great North Road, the old coaching route between London and Edinburgh.

Carlisle Park is located on the southern bank of the River Wansbeck in Morpeth. The park has the William Turner Garden, one of the only four floral clocks in England, a statue of Emily Wilding Davison, as well as other facilities and attractions. Morpeth's Mafeking Park, at the bottom of Station Bank, was unsuccessfully put forward by locals to be listed as the smallest park in the world in the Guinness Book of Records.

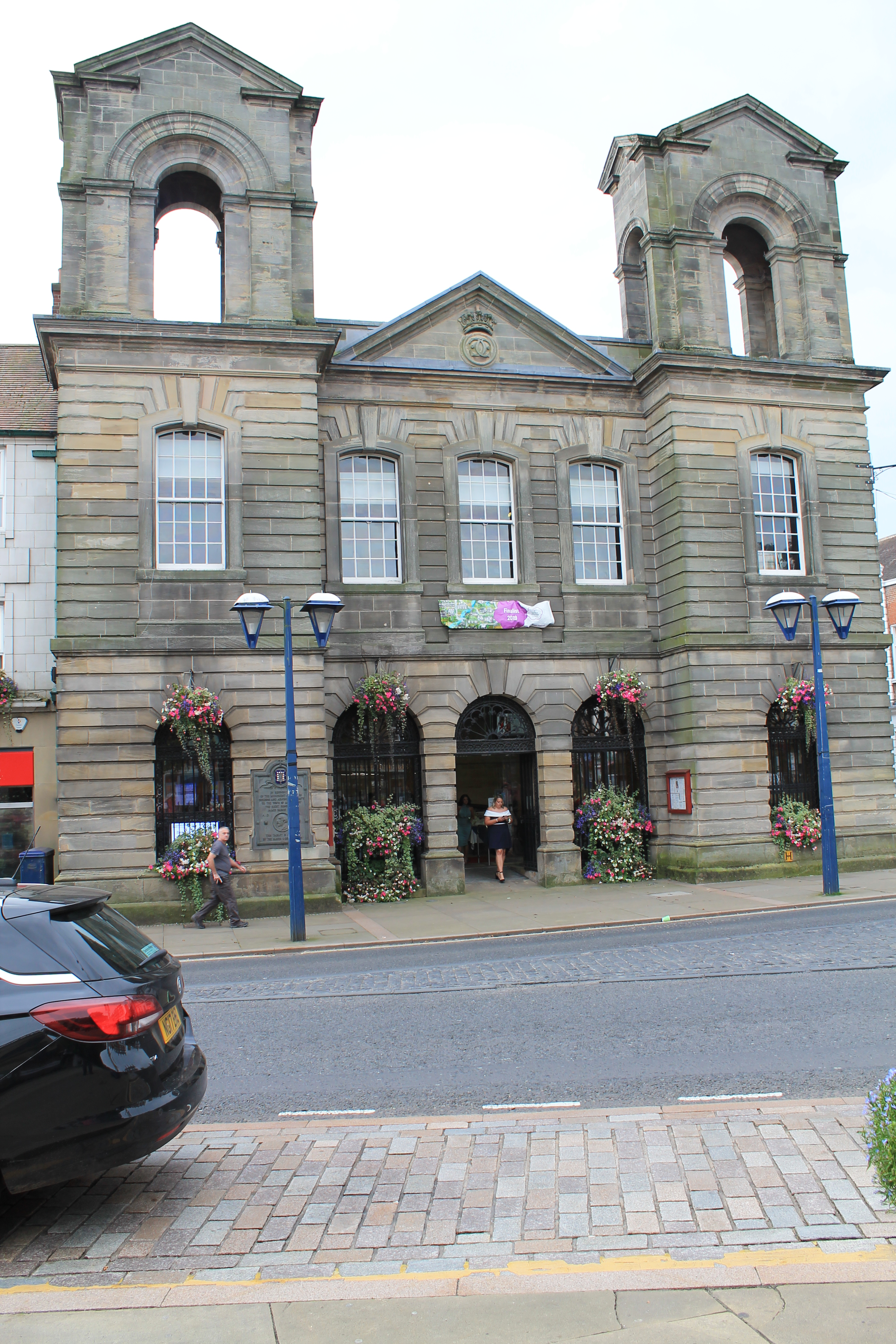
Morpeth Town Hall

Other landmarks are:

- Morpeth Clock Tower, a free-standing 17th century clock tower
- Morpeth Town Hall, originally designed by Sir John Vanbrugh (rebuilt 1869)
- Collingwood House, the Georgian home of Admiral Lord Collingwood
- Morpeth Chantry, a 13th-century chapel that now houses the town's tourist information centre and the Morpeth Chantry Bagpipe Museum
- Morpeth Castle, which stands on a hill to the south, is now operated by the Landmark Trust as holiday accommodation
- A nuclear bunker located underneath Morpeth County Hall
- A gateway on High Stanners framed by a whale's jawbone
- Ruins of Newminster Abbey, a former Cistercian abbey about one mile to the west of Morpeth
- Morpeth Court, former courthouse and prison, now converted into apartments

== Notable people ==
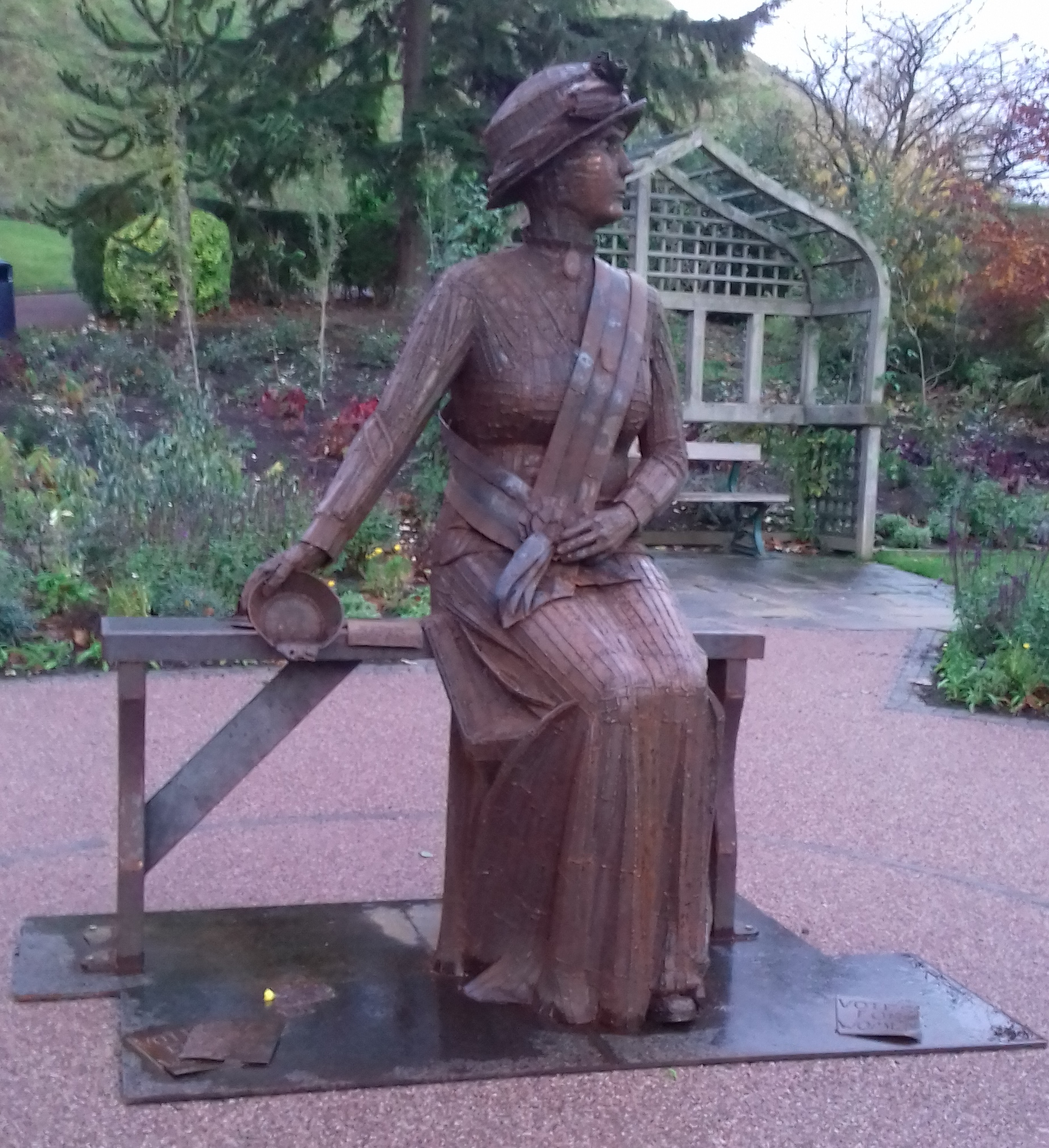
A statue of Emily Wilding Davison commemorating 100 years since women were given the right to vote

- Bill Rutherford (1955–), Professor and Chair in Biochemistry of Solar energy in the Department of Life sciences at Imperial College London.
- Lawrence William Adamson (1829–1911), High Sheriff of Northumberland, who died at Linden Hall near Morpeth in 1911
- Emerson Muschamp Bainbridge (1817–1892), founder of Bainbridge Department Store – the first such store in the world – in Newcastle upon Tyne, who, from 1877, lived near Morpeth at Eshott Hall
- Arthur Bigge, 1st Baron Stamfordham (1849–1931), born at Linden Hall, near Morpeth, who became private secretary to Queen Victoria and George V
- Robert Blakey (1795–1878), radical journalist and philosopher, born in Manchester Street, Morpeth
- Luke Clennell (1781–1840), engraver and painter, born in Morpeth
- Vice Admiral Cuthbert Collingwood (1748–1810), Royal Navy Admiral. He lived at Collingwood House in Oldgate and once said "Whenever I think how I am to be happy again, my thoughts carry me back to Morpeth".
- Emily Wilding Davison (1872-1913), a suffragette who was killed when she fell under the King's horse during the Epsom Derby in 1913. Following her funeral in London, her coffin was brought by train to Morpeth for burial in St Mary's churchyard.
- William Elliott, Baron Elliott of Morpeth (1920–2011), Conservative politician born in Morpeth
- John Cuthbert Hedley (1837–1913), Benedictine monk and Roman Catholic Bishop of Newport born at Carlisle House, Morpeth
- Charles Howard, 3rd Earl of Carlisle (1669–1738), MP for Morpeth in 1689–1692
- Robert Morrison (1782–1834), translator of the Bible into Chinese and first Protestant missionary in China, born in Buller's Green, Morpeth
- John Peacock (c. 1756–1817), piper, born in Morpeth
- John Urpeth Rastrick (1780–1856), railway engineer, born in Morpeth
- William Turner (naturalist) (c. 1508 – 13 July 1568), an English divine and reformer, physician and natural historian. The William Turner Garden is situated in Carlisle Park, Morpeth.
- Dr N. T. Wright (born 1948), Anglican theologian and author, born in Morpeth

=== Sportspeople ===
- James (Jim) Alder (born 1940), athlete, who spent his childhood in Morpeth after being adopted by the Alder family
- Toby Flood (born 1985), rugby union player for Leicester Tigers and England, who attended Morpeth Chantry School
- Hamish Turnbull (born 1999), Cyclist representing British Cycling and Great Britain.
- Joe Robinson (1919–1991), footballer, born in Morpeth, who played for Blackpool in the 1948 FA Cup Final
- Walter Trevelyan (1821 – 1894), first-class cricketer and barrister, born in Morpeth
- James Kell (born 1997), racing driver
- Charlotte Naughton (born 2008), youth champion golfer

== See also ==
- Viscount Morpeth, the heir apparent to the Earl of Carlisle.
