= Morpeth Town Hall =

Municipal building in Morpeth, Northumberland, England

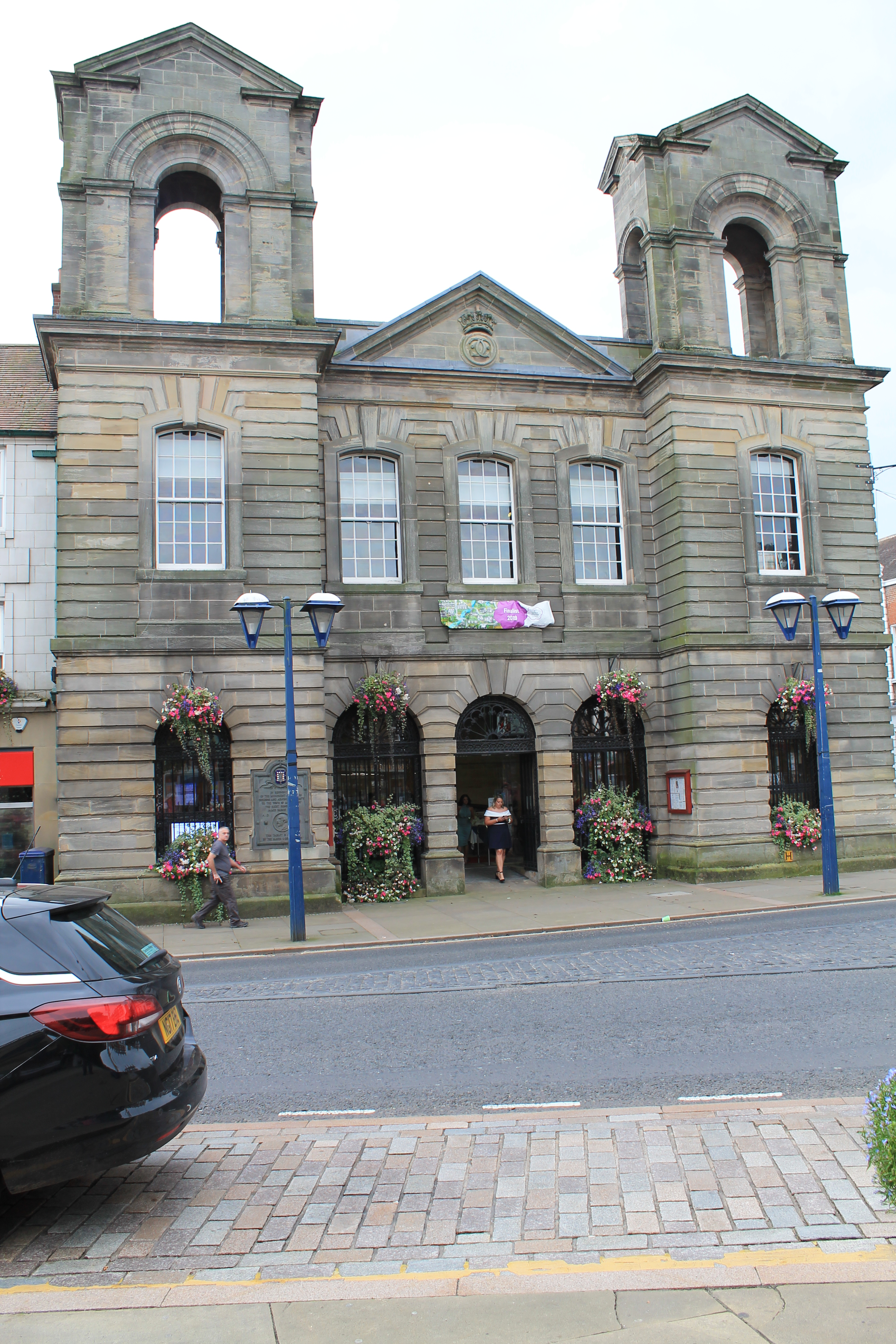
- Morpeth Town Hall

- Shown in Northumberland
- 55.1673°N 1.6905°W
- Location: Market Place, Morpeth

History
- Built: 1714

Site notes
- Architect: John Vanbrugh
- Architectural style: Baroque style

Listed Building – Grade II
- Official name: The Town Hall
- Designated: 22 August 1986
- Reference no.: 1042730

Morpeth Town Hall is a municipal building in the Market Place, Morpeth, Northumberland, England. The structure, which was the meeting place of Morpeth Borough Council, is a Grade II listed building.

== History ==
The building was commissioned in the early 18th century by the lord of the manor, the 3rd Earl of Carlisle. It was designed by John Vanbrugh in the Baroque style, built in rusticated ashlar stone and was completed in 1714. The design involved a symmetrical main frontage with five bays facing onto the Market Place with the end bays projected forward as towers with voussoirs and open pediments in the top stage. The central section of three bays featured three arched openings containing wrought iron grills on the ground floor; there were segmental headed sash windows on the first floor and an entablature, a cornice and a pediment above with a coat of arms in the tympanum. Internally, the principal rooms were the butter market and, behind it, the corn exchange on the ground floor, and the assembly hall on the first floor.

In September 1758, an army sergeant was killed and two other soldiers badly injured when 3,000 ammunition cartridges exploded in an accident in the town hall. In the early 19th century theatrical events took place in the town hall with Macbeth being performed there. After significant population growth, largely associated with Morpeth's status as a market town, the area became a municipal borough, with the town hall as its headquarters, in 1835. The town hall was badly damaged in a fire in 1869 and the façade was subsequently restored, so as to create an exact reproduction of the original, and the structure behind it completely rebuilt; this was all at the expense of the 8th Earl of Carlisle, under the supervision of the local architect, Robert James Johnson.

In February 1909, the suffragette and British Liberal Party politician, Alison Garland addressed a meeting in the town hall during which she spoke about votes for women as well as broader political issues. In 1917, the industrialist Lord Joicey bought the town hall from the 11th Earl of Carlisle and presented it to the town, refusing to accept re-imbursement despite a fund raising campaign organised by civic officials. The building then remained the headquarters of the borough council until it moved to new offices at No. 36 Bridge Street which were opened by the mayor, Richard Elliott, on 5 May 1939.

The town hall remained the main venue for civic events in the town and later accommodated the offices of Morpeth Town Council as well as the local registrar's office: it also became an approved venue for weddings and civil partnership ceremonies. An extensive programme of restoration works costing £1.1 million was commissioned by the Greater Morpeth Development Trust, carried out to a design by Napper Architects and was completed in 2009. The works involved improved access to the butter market and the restoration of the grand staircase. A bust, designed by Helen Ridehalgh, depicting the former Commander-in-Chief of the Mediterranean Fleet, Vice-Admiral Lord Collingwood, was installed in the butter market in March 2013.

Works of art in the town hall include a portrait by Thomas Lawrence of the former Lord Privy Seal, the 6th Earl of Carlisle, as well as portraits by Thomas Bowman Garvie of Alderman George Barron Grey and of Alderman George Young. Other items of interest displayed in the mayor's parlour include a strong box known as the "town hutch" commissioned by Lord Dacre and containing documents dating back to 1513, a ceremonial mace made in 1604 and several cannonballs used in the siege of Morpeth in January 1644 during the English Civil War.
