= Ashington (disambiguation) =

Ashington is a town in Northumberland, England.

Ashington may also refer to:

== Places ==
- Ashington Academy
- Ashington, Dorset
- Ashington, Somerset
- Ashington, West Sussex
- Ashington End, a village in Lincolnshire
- Ashingdon, a village in Essex with a similar pronunciation
- Ashington Range
- Ashington railway station
- Ashington Colliery Junction railway station
- Ashington Town Hall

== People ==
- Henry Ashington (1891–1917), English athlete
- Robert Ashington Bullen (1850–1912), Anglican priest
- Ryan Ashington (born 1983), English former professional footballer

== Other ==
- Ashington Group, artist society
- Ashington Piggeries Ltd v Christopher Hill Ltd, UK commercial law case
- Blyth and Ashington (UK Parliament constituency)
