= Narbi Price =

British painter and curator

- Education: PhD Fine Art; MFA Fine Art; Newcastle University; BA(Hons) Fine Art; Northumbria University
- Occupations: Artist, Curator
- Website: www.narbiprice.co.uk

Narbi Price born in Hartlepool, UK, in 1979, is a British painter and curator.

== Education ==
Price has a Doctor of Philosophy degree (PhD) in Fine Art from Newcastle University where he researched the legacy of the Ashington Group painters, he also holds a Master of Fine Art degree (MFA) from Newcastle University, and a Bachelor of Arts degree with Honours (BA Hons) in Fine Art from Northumbria University.

== Career ==
Narbi Price is a 2012 prize winner in the John Moore's Painting Prize, 2017 winner of the Contemporary British Painting Prize and Visual Artist of the Year at The Journal Culture Awards 2018. Artist Jo Vickers wrote of Price's paintings, "At first look, his photorealistic paintings are demonstrations of clear technical ability, albeit with unconventional subject matter. But Narbi’s processes, techniques and motivation give the paintings an air of defiance that suggests that the artist is painting primarily for himself, which ironically, might be the key to their popularity".

Critic Matthew Collings wrote that Price's work "appears photographic but up close it jumps into a completely different dimension, becoming dancing loose dots and blips, free of any representation whatsoever."

In 2018 Price curated an exhibition of unseen Pitmen Painters works at Woodhorn Museum, Ashington, Northumberland, UK. He is a member of Contemporary British Painting

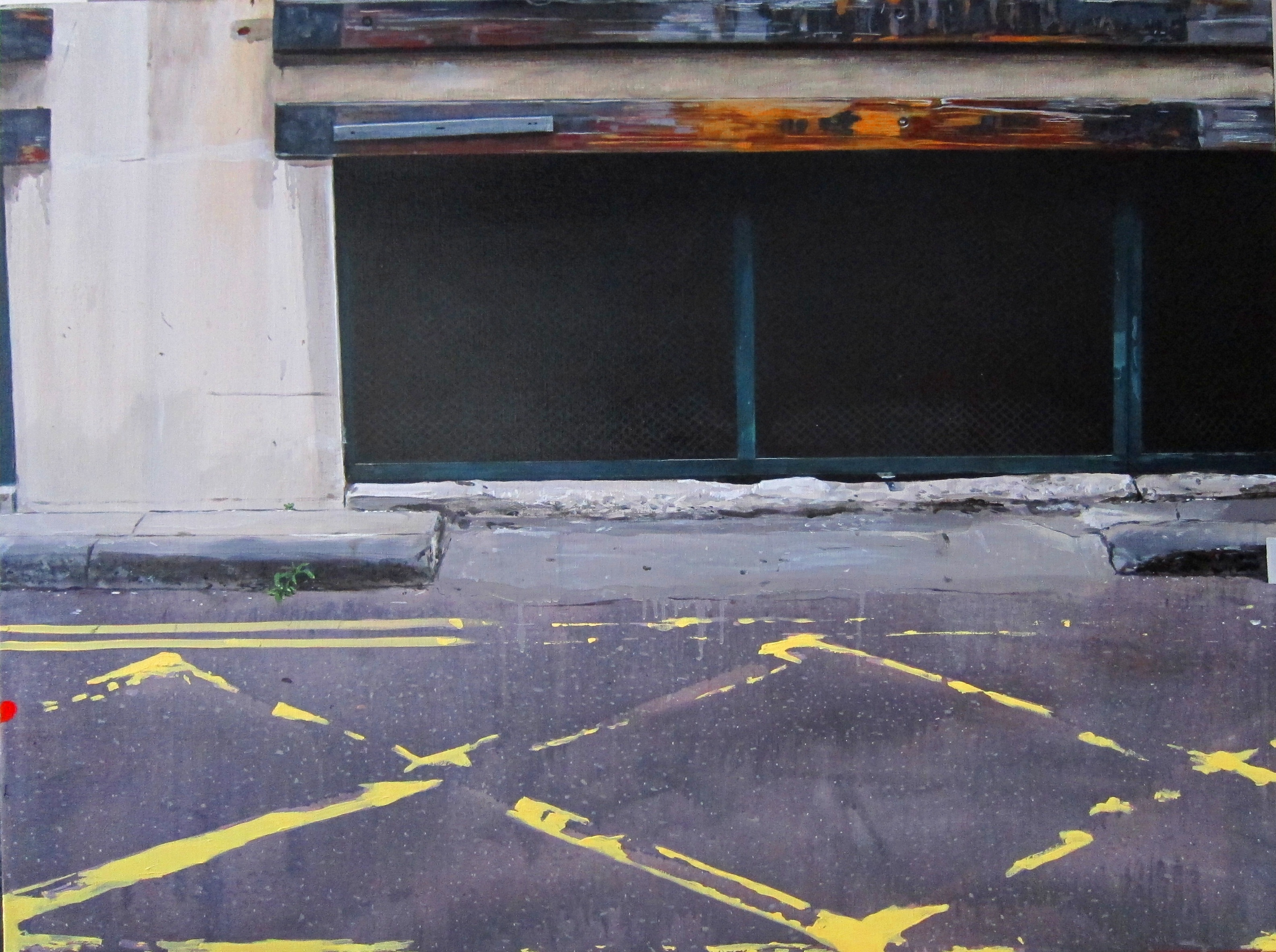
Narbi Price, Untitled Kerbstone Painting (MJK)

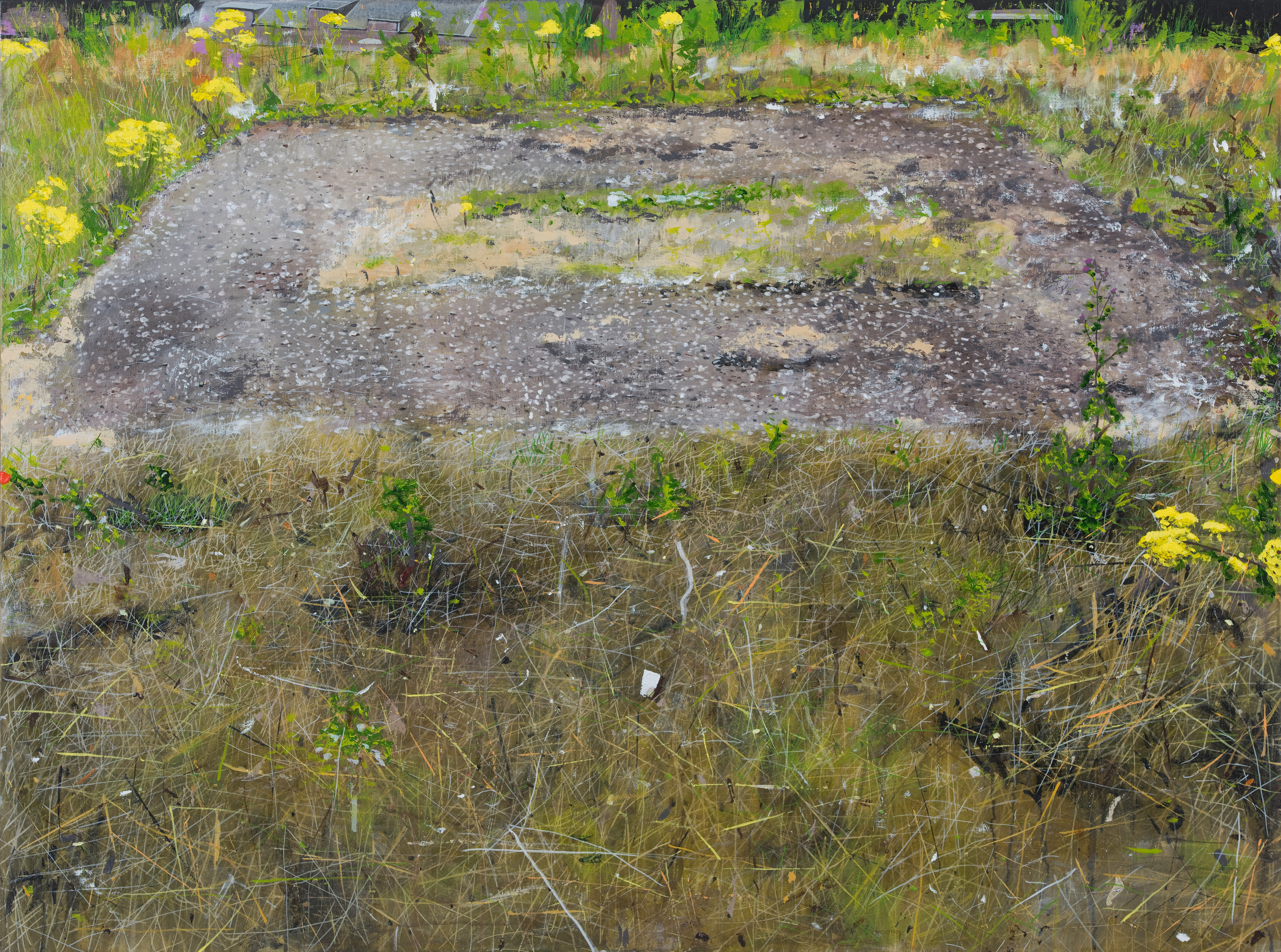
Untitled Well Painting

== Selected solo exhibitions ==
- 2020 - The Ashington Paintings: Redux, XL Gallery, Newcastle University, UK
- 2019 - All I Start Will End, Herrick Gallery, London
- 2018 - The Ashington Paintings, Woodhorn Museum, Ashington, Northumberland, UK
- 2017 - This Must Be The Place, Vane Gallery, Newcastle upon Tyne, UK
- 2016 - Codeword, Paper Gallery, Manchester, UK
- 2014 - Narbi Price, Galleria SIX, Milan, Italy

== Selected group exhibitions ==
- 2022 - Everybody Knows This Is Nowhere: Painting in the North East. Now., Newcastle Contemporary Art, Newcastle upon Tyne
- 2020 - Picture Palace, Transition Gallery, London
- 2020 - Beyond Other Horizons, Iași Palace of Culture, Romania
- 2019 - neo:artprize, Bolton Museum & Art Gallery, UK
- 2019 - Royal Academy of Arts Summer Exhibition, Royal Academy of Arts, London
- 2019 - Made in Britain; 82 Painters of the 21st Century, Muzeum Narodowe w Gdansk, Poland
- 2018 - St. Nowhere, Lewisham Arthouse, London
- 2018 - Paint North, Ladybeck Project Space, Leeds, UK

== Selected publications and media ==
- 2018 - The Ashington Paintings, Narbi Price & Matthew Collings, Ashington Group Trustees
- 2018 - Pitmen Painters: Unseen, Narbi Price & William Feaver, Ashington Group Trustees
- 2017 - Drawing and Painting – Materials and Techniques for Contemporary Artists, Kate Wilson, Thames & Hudson
- 2016 - Vitamin P3: New Perspectives in Painting’, Barry Schwabsky, Phaidon Press Limited
- 2012 - John Moores Painting Prize 2012 Catalogue, Ann Bukantas (Ed.), National Museums Liverpool
