= Widdrington Station and Stobswood =

Civil parish in Northumberland, England

Coordinates: 55.2408°N 1.6138°W

- Location within Northumberland
- Population: 2,767 (2011 census)
- OS grid reference: NZ245941
- Civil parish: Widdrington Station and Stobswood
- Shire county: Northumberland
- Region: North East
- Country: England
- Sovereign state: United Kingdom
- Post town: MORPETH
- Postcode district: NE61
- Dialling code: 01670
- Police: Northumbria
- Fire: Northumberland
- Ambulance: North East
- UK Parliament: North Northumberland

Widdrington Station and Stobswood is a civil parish in the county of Northumberland, England. It has a population of 2,767 (as of 2011) and is 6 miles (9.7 km) north-northeast of Morpeth. It includes the settlements of Widdrington Station and Stobswood.

== History ==
=== Toponymy ===
As the name suggests, Widdrington Station has a railway station. This is on the East Coast Main Line.

== Geography ==
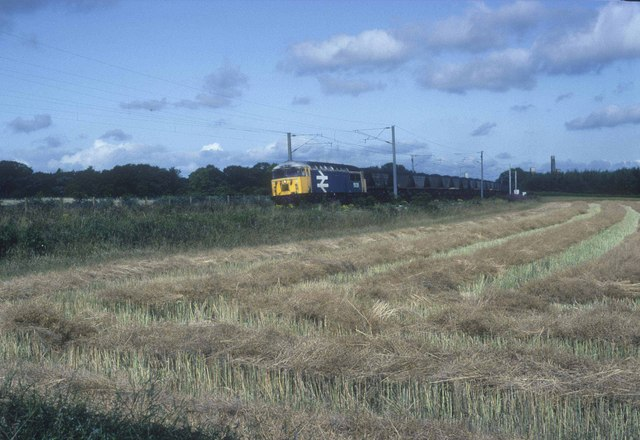
Coal train for Cambois

The soil is a strong clay, producing fine crops of wheat and beans, and the surface is generally level. It rises more steeply to 70 metres (230 ft) AOD to the far west of the parish and with a gentle elevation towards the old village, which commands extensive views in every direction, and the area around which formerly abounded in wood. On the horizon from here is the sea. Fields are extensively farmed, some of which are pasture, and there are remains to the west of a quarry of freestone, active in 1848. The population is spread over a large area with a density of approximately 0.7 persons per hectare which is average across the entire region.

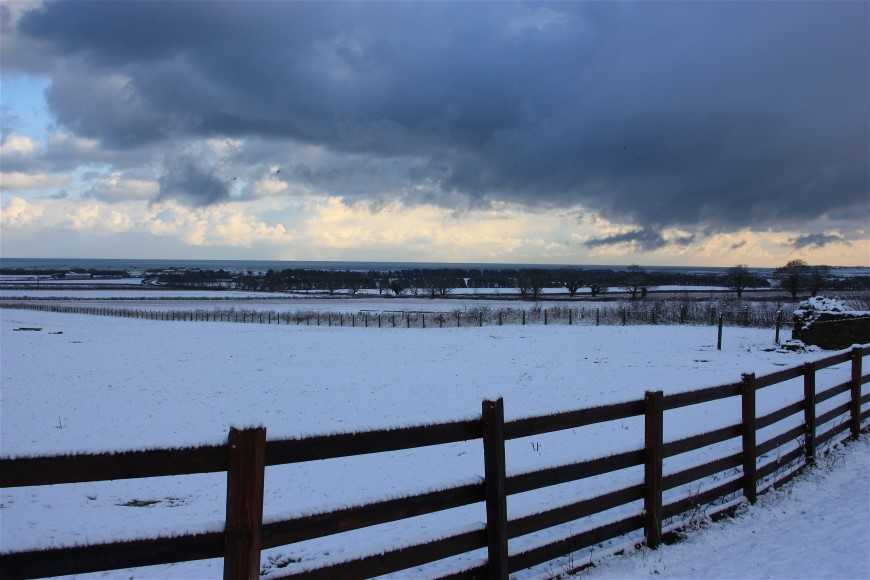
Snowy field at Druridge Bay.

== Education ==
Widdrington's educational provision includes a state-assisted first school, voluntary controlled by the local Church of England ecclesiastical parish, supported by the Diocese.

== Localities ==
=== Stobswood ===
Included in the parish name and boundaries is the neighbourhood of Stobswood, 300 metres (980 ft) north-west, across the green buffer of Grange Wood. Stobswood has a population of around 120. The majority of the housing in Stobswood was built in support of the railway and the defunct brickworks that previously operated just to the east of the railway line. Stobswood Miners Welfare is the local pub for Stobswood, which hosts two Saturday football teams, Stobswood Welfare A.F.C and a newly formed Stobswood Welfare A.F.C Reserve team. It also hosts 3 Senior Cricket teams, 2 sides playing on a Saturday and a midweek side playing on a Thursday, all playing in the Northumberland & Tyneside Cricket League.

== Local Government ==
Widdrington Station and Stobswood lies within the Ulgham ward of the county-wide unitary county, Northumberland. Its county councillor is Cllr David J. Towns (Conservative) and the villages fall within the Druridge Bay Community Forum and the Northern Area Committee jurisdictions of the council.

== Transport ==
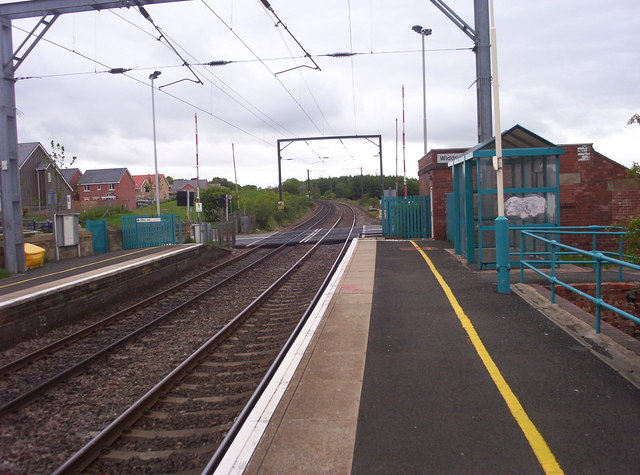
Railway Station

Roads

2 miles (3.2 km) west of the station at the village centre is the A1, at a higher elevation throughout, and 1 mile (1.6 km) east of the station is the A1068 about one third of the distance between Druridge Bay and the village centre. Both are north–south routes, with the dualled route heading north being the A1.

Trains

A morning and evening train stops in each direction allowing commuting if working relatively long days to Morpeth or Newcastle with a journey time respectively of: 9 minutes and 31–35 minutes.

Buses

An express bus route, the X18 connects to the town centres of Newcastle, Morpeth to the south via the village to four to the north: Amble, Walkworth, Alnmouth, Alnwick.

Other bus routes are the:

- X20, from Ashington and Lynemouth via the village to four northern towns mentioned.
- X22 which starts here and connects nearby Cresswell on Druridge Bay, then continuing to the city of Newcastle, via Ashington.

All three are operated by Arriva.

== See also ==
- Woodhorn
- Druridge Bay
- Ulgham
- James Bulmer Johnson – local resident who won the Victoria Cross
