= Oliver Kilbourn =

British coal miner and painter

- Born: Oliver Percival Kilbourn; October 6, 1904; Ashington, Northumberland
- Died: April 1993 (aged 88)
- Education: Workers' Educational Association Workers' Educational Association; Ashington Miners' Union
- Known for: Coal mining Painting
- Notable work: My Life as a Pitman
- Movement: Modern art Figurative painting

Oliver Percival Kilbourn (6 October 1904 – April 1993) was a British coal miner, painter, and founding member of the Ashington Group.

Widely considered to be the group's best-known artist, Kilbourn used the experiences that he had gained while working in the mines and represented them in his art work. His main contribution to the Ashington Group was his focus on Modern art.

== Early life and family ==
Kilbourn was born in 75 Chestnut Street, Ashington, and was the fifth child of James Smith Kilbourn and Mary Hannah Chilton. After attending elementary school, he began working as a miner at the Duke pit, Ashington, three days after his thirteenth birthday. When Kilbourn was eleven, his father had an accident in the pit and damaged his back. He never worked again. Kilbourn was to become the "breadwinner more or less, maintaining the whole family on fourteen shillings a week till [his] sisters got jobs."

== Coal mining ==
Kilbourn worked at the Duke pit for eleven years until its closure. William Feaver writes that after the Duke pit closed, "Kilbourn moved to the nearby Ellington collier, where he became a coalface drawer aged twenty-four. He remained at Ellington for the rest of his working life, becoming a salvage drawer during the Second World War and a wasteman, responsible for the maintenance of the mine's airways." Kilbourn retired from mining in 1968.

"I've spent shall we say about a third of my life in semi-darkness. The face now. You went in the morning and it was very very low. Some seams here were just about two feet. Well, you were on your knees or sometimes lying on your back or sideways, and you were jolly glad to get your legs stretched a bit."

== Artwork ==
Starting around the mid-1920s, Kilbourn "attended tutorial class organized by the Ashington Miners' Union and then the WEA and it was through this route that he enrolled on Robert Lyon's art appreciation course in October 1934."

In the course, the Ashington Group focused on the history of art as well as their own setting and way of life: coal. While drawing heavily from the conditions of the coal mines and the coal miner's lifestyle, Kilbourn produced art work that reflected his experiences.

"A key factor in our long life, I think, was the fact that we were never a commercial group but preserved our idealism. We thought we were doing something that no one else could do. We were depicting a way of life both below and above ground in a mining village that only we knew by experiencing it. Life goes on and we paint life … A funny thing, once you've painted a picture, you feel it's part of your life.":

Seven years after attending an exhibition in Durham, Kilbourn considered creating a visual memoir of his experiences, "starting as a pom-pom boy on the compressed air coal-cutting machines in 1917, going on to be a putter-lad, a coal face drawer, a salvage drawer and a wasteman." During development of his project, "the memories were directed into detailed narrative." 'My Life as a Pitman' became an exhibition in 1977 and was considered as a "North Country counterpart to the colourful rural Chinese scenes."

== Writing ==
Aside from producing art, the Ashington Group maintained a publication called The Ashington Collieries Magazine. The October 1937 issue features Kilbourn's "An Approach To Modern Art".

=== "An Approach To Modern Art" ===
Kilbourn's article consists of a brief history of 14th & 15th century, Dutch school, French as well as Impressionist art and their relationship with the use of color, shading, and what they aimed to depict. His praise for each movement of art establishes his appreciation for the art that has given us "pictures skillfully executed and full of a wealth of ornament." Kilbourn credits French painter Cézanne with "opening new avenues of experience to the artistic sense" and giving a "fuller meaning of artistic expression." But, Kilbourn writes that,

"we have so far considered the growth of modern art from the standpoint of the outstanding artists. But I think we will not fully understand the modern movement unless we also realize that the condition of life around us—scientific, economic and domestic—all tend to influence the work of the artist."

As seen in Kilbourn's work, modern art can reflect the conditions that artists experience. When judging modern art, Kilbourn says that one must disregard the standards set by the "early masters," and judge it "in the same way that we do applied modern artistic expression, such as fashion in dress or furnishing in the home." The main difference between the works of the "early masters" and modern artists is that "modern work is more simple and more direct." Kilbourn concludes, "But, I wonder, do we judge the modern picture as sympathetically as we should do?"

Above all, Kilbourn is saying that as civilisation became more complex, art became more complex. Art can be simple and still be art, but must be judged through an "applied modern artistic expression," because new conditions can influence art.

== Personal life ==
Oliver Kilbourn was married to Margaret Isabel (Peggy; 1914–2006) on 20 November 1952.

== Notable exhibitions ==
- Woodhorn Museum and Northumberland Archives
- Midland Group, Nottingham, 1977: 'My Life as a Pitman'

== Notable works ==
- Bait Time
- Building Air Raid Shelters
- Coal Face Drawers
- Dawn-Ashington Colliery
- Drilling Shot-Hole by Hand
- Duke Street 2am
- Ellington Pit Yard
- End of Shift
- Half-Time at the Rec (welfare)
- Miner Setting in Low Seam
- Pithead Baths
- Progging the Mat
- The Hermit
- The Playground

== Sources ==
- Feaver, William. 'Ashington group (act. 1934–1983)'. Oxford Dictionary of National Biography. Oxford University Press, Oct 2008 accessed 7 May 2013.
- Feaver, William. Pitmen Painters. N.p.: Northumbria, 2010. Print.
- Kilbourn, Oliver. "An Approach To Modern Art." The Ashington Collieries Magazine The Appreciation of Art.X (1937): 272+. Mass Observation Online. Web. 7 May 2013.
