= Woodhorn Railway =

UK railway line

Coordinates: 55.1898°N 1.5496°W

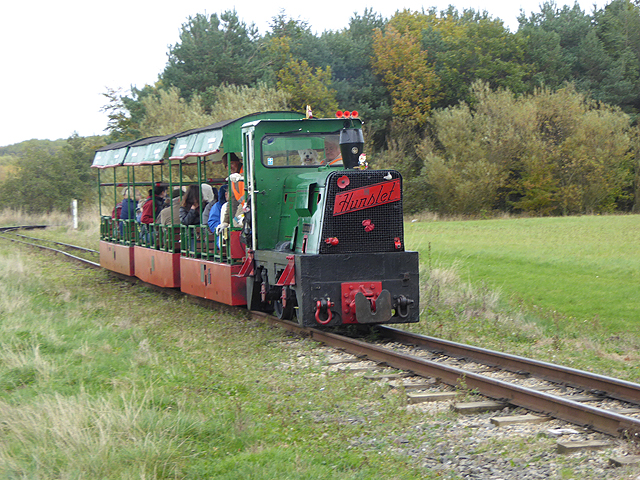
Woodhorn Railway

Woodhorn Railway is a 1 kilometre (0.62 mi) long railway on 2 ft (610 mm) narrow-gauge track. The line runs from Woodhorn, Northumberland, England, to a restaurant in the car park of the QE2 lake.

== History of the railway ==
In 1991, the Woodhorn Museum and Northumberland Archives (Wansbeck Council) was given an ex-mining locomotive and three man-riding cars by the NCB, following the closure of Vane Tempest colliery in County Durham. The line was built, completed in 1994, and ran from the site of the present Museum, along the side of the Queen Elizabeth II Country Park, terminating at the platform known as Lakeside Halt. For twenty years a visitor attraction was run by volunteers. In that time two additional engines were acquired: an engine involved in the construction of the Channel Tunnel, and another that was a mining shunter train. However in 2018 operations were shuttered due to a lack of volunteers. A notice at the Lakeside terminus says that operations are suspended due to the track and running stock needing repairs. In 2024, restoration of the line began after 1540 sleepers were purchased.

== Locomotives ==
=== Black Diamond (Hunslet) ===
One of Three locomotives, the Hunslet is the line's longest serving machine. Delivered to Woodhorn in 1991, primarily as a static exhibit following the closure of Vane Tempest Colliery but is now the lead locomotive of the fleet. It has been renamed as the Black Diamond (nickname for coal), out of respect for the industry in which it formerly worked, the name "Hunslet" is picked out on the radiator grill. It is painted in original livery of green and black. The locomotive was built by the Hunslet Engine Company in Leeds in 1975, weighing 9.5 tons, powered by a four-cylinder water-cooled diesel engine.

=== Edward Stanton (Schöma) ===
This locomotive came to the railway in 2008 and whilst it was built by Schöma in Germany, the railway acquired it after the construction of the Channel Tunnel between England and France, meaning this locomotive is the youngest in the railway's fleet. Edward is a three-cylinder air-cooled diesel engine, weighing at around 4.5 tons. Originally in a white livery, but has since been repainted, and both doors and windows have been added for better safety and operation.

=== Pit Pony (Hunslet Jenbach) ===
Hunslet Jenbach no 9353 Pit Pony (formerly Rio Gen) was built in the UK by Hunslet in 1994 under license from Jenbach, she went to Singapore to work on a tunneling contract that never came to fruition. In 2013 The loco was purchased by the WNGR and has been here ever since, In 2024 The loco was sold and is now privately owned and on semi-permanent loan to the railway, it has been repainted black with wasp stripes and renamed Pit Pony.

The Loco has a 25HP Kubota engine and is a diesel-hydraulic, it weighs 2.7 tons The name Pit Pony is fitting as the railway uses mostly ex-mining rolling stock, is situated at Woodhorn Colliery.

== Rolling Stock ==
=== Manriders ===
The man riders are the railway's current passenger rolling stock, built for use underground by Allens of Tipton, they are reliable runners and currently undergoing restoration.

=== Flat Wagons ===
The 3 large flat wagons are ex RNAD and weigh around a ton each, they were made by hudson.

=== Bogie Coach ===
Formerly the railway's accessible coach, it proved to be an unreliable runner so is currently out of use and awaiting restoration and repair to make it a reliable item of rolling stock.

=== Coal tubs ===
The railway owns 3 coal tubs that are used as planters, these can be seen on the approach to the station from Woodhorn Colliery car park.

=== Private Wagons ===
The Following wagons are Privately owned and on semi-permanent loan to the railway.

The railway has 4 ex Brick kiln wagons that will be used on the demonstration goods train once the line is reopened, these are a Hudson design. the railway also has 2 Hudson Mining skip wagons and a converted Hudson Skip wagon chassis, these wagons are undergoing restoration.
