= Pegswood railway station =

Railway station in Northumberland, England

Pegswood
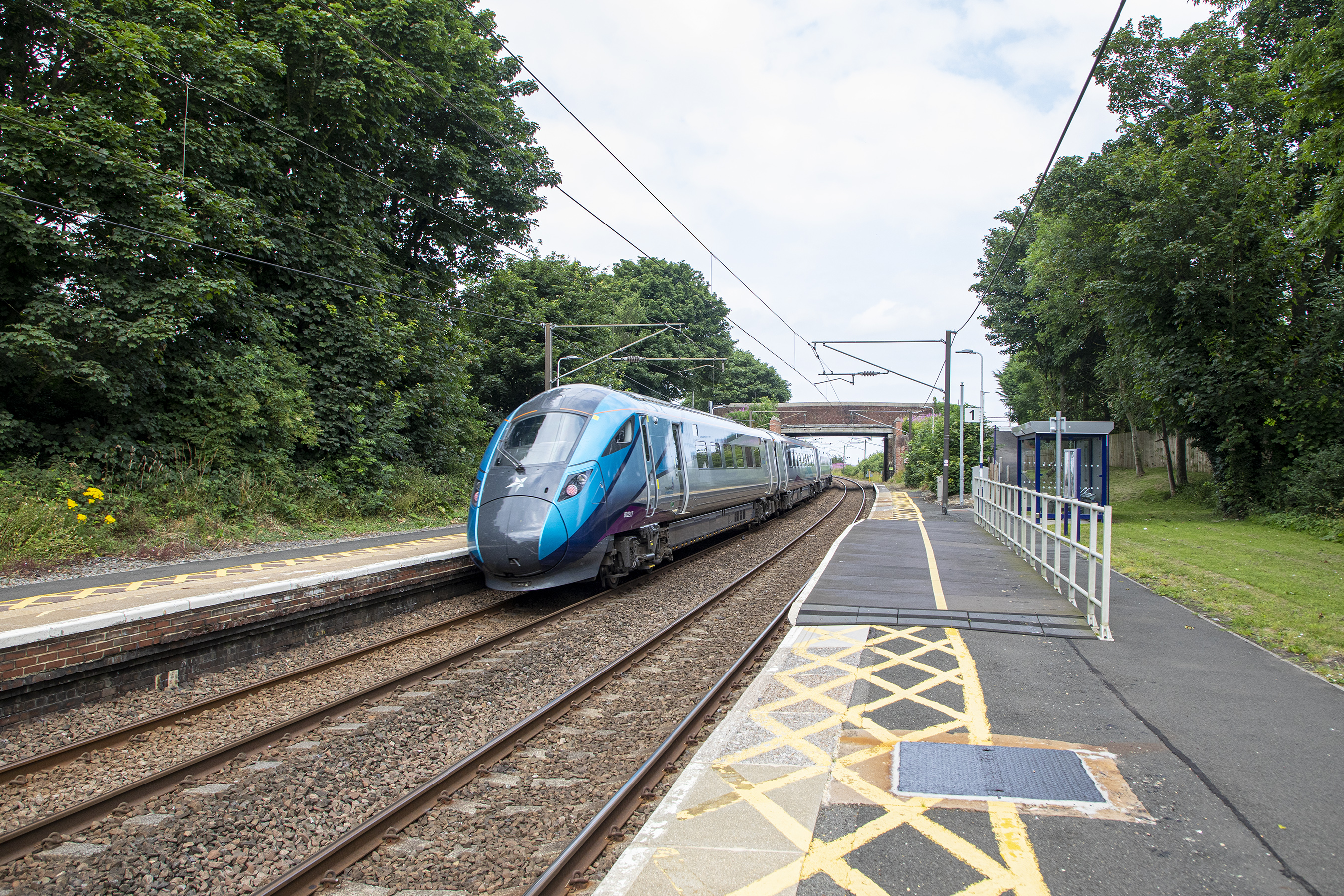

General information
- Location: Pegswood, Northumberland; England
- Coordinates: 55°10′42″N 1°38′37″W
- Grid reference: NZ227871
- Owner: Network Rail
- Manager: Northern Trains
- Platforms: 2

Other information
- Station code: PEG
- Classification: DfT category F2

History
- Original company: North Eastern Railway
- Pre-grouping: North Eastern Railway
- Post-grouping: London and North Eastern Railway; British Rail (North Eastern Region)

Key dates
- 1 January 1903: Opened

Passengers
- 2021/22: ▲1,560
- 2022/23: ▲1,612
- 2023/24: ▼1,500
- 2024/25: ▼1,468
- 2025/26: ▼1,366
Location
- Location within Northumberland
Notes
- Passenger statistics from the Office of Rail and Road

Pegswood is a railway station on the East Coast Main Line, which runs between London King's Cross and Edinburgh Waverley. The station, situated 18 miles 44 chains (18.6 mi; 29.9 km) north of Newcastle, serves the villages of Longhirst and Pegswood in Northumberland, England. It is owned by Network Rail and managed by Northern Trains.

== History ==
The station was opened by the North Eastern Railway on 1 January 1903, to serve the nearby village and colliery. The line passing through the station, which was constructed by the Newcastle and Berwick Railway during the 1840s, had opened more than fifty years earlier.

The station was twice threatened with closure after nationalisation. The first attempt to close the station was made in 1958, with a further attempt made in 1966, during the Beeching cuts. The station was reprieved each time. Until 1968, the station was served by through trains running between Newcastle and Alnwick.

An average of 3 or 4 services each way per day ran to and from Berwick-upon-Tweed and Edinburgh Waverley until the 1980s. Following the electrification of the East Coast Main Line, these services were curtailed to Berwick-upon-Tweed. Services were further cut (and reduced in frequency to the present residual level) by British Rail in May 1991, due to a shortage of rolling stock.

The local rail user group, SENRUG, has been campaigning to improve service levels at the station, and at neighbouring Widdrington, since September 2016.

== Facilities ==
The station has two platforms with basic facilities. A waiting shelter is located on the Newcastle-bound platform. There is step-free access to both platforms, which are linked by road bridge.

Pegswood is not part of the Northern Trains penalty fare network, as a ticket machine has not yet (as of January 2023) been installed at the station.

== Services ==
As of the December 2025 timetable change, the station is currently served by just three trains per day: two southbound to Newcastle via Morpeth (one in the early morning and one in the evening) and one northbound to Chathill (in the evening).

No services call at the station on Sundays.

Rolling stock used: Class 156 Super Sprinter and Class 158 Express Sprinter

Preceding station	National Rail	Following station
Morpeth towards Newcastle via Morpeth	Northern Trains; East Coast Main Line	Widdrington towards Chathill
	Historical railways	
Morpeth	North Eastern Railway; York, Newcastle and Berwick Railway	Ashington Colliery Junction
