= The Raspberry Ripple Awards =

The Raspberry Ripple Awards was an awards show broadcast in 1997 to celebrate (and sometimes ridicule) the representation of disabled people in the media. The idea, formulated by the 1 in 8 Group and produced by Kudos Productions was made for Channel 4.

== Synopsis ==
The Raspberry Ripple Awards were designed to recognise the inclusivity of disabled people within the media industry. Actor Alan Cumming presented the awards on the night. The awards ranged from radio to theatre, Children's television to Factual television. They also gave out awards to the worst portrayals, highlighting the ways that media companies should not address disability. Cumming said the words "...could not be here tonight..." to rapturous laughter and applause, although on some occasions did invite surprise guests linked to that production to the stage to catch them off guard.

== Winners ==
Award	Nominee	Produced By	Result
Best Theatre Production	Sympathy for the Devil	Grey Eye Theatre	Winner
Best Theatre Production	Waiting for Godot	Tottering Bipeds	Nominated
Best Theatre Production	Sitting Pretty	Arc Theatre	Nominated
Worst Theatre Production	The Cripple of Inishmaan	The National Theatre	Winner – only nomination
Best Television Factual	The Clothes Show	BBC	Winner
Best Television Factual	"Challenging Children"	Q.E.D.	Nominated
Best Television Factual	Over the Edge – "Strange Little Creatures"	BBC	Nominated
Best Television Factual	BBC United Kingdom – "Tottering Bipeds"	BBC	Nominated
Worst Television Factual	Network First – "Igor: The Boy Who Dared to Dream"	ITV	Nominated
Worst Television Factual	Panorama – "Care in the Community"	BBC	Winner
Worst Television Factual	Picture This – "Nick at New College"	BBC/3BM	Nominated
Best Radio Documentary	Chris' Story	BBC Radio 4	Nominated
Best Radio Documentary	Disability Day	Talkradio	Nominated
Best Radio Documentary	Dear Diary – Bristol to Tuana	BBC Radio 4	Nominated
Best Radio Documentary	Peter White	-	Winner
Best Radio Drama	Spoonface Steinberg	BBC Radio 4	Winner
Best Radio Drama	Minor Adjustment	BBC Radio 4	Nominated
Best Children's Television Show	ZZZap!	CITV	Nominated
Best Children's Television Show	Sonny's Ears	CITV	Winner
Best Children's Television Show	The Vibe	Channel 4	Nominated
Best Commercial	Coca-Cola – "Eat Football, Sleep Football, Drink Coca-Cola"	Coca-Cola	Nominated
Best Commercial	The Co-operative Bank – "See the Person, Not the Disability"	The National Disability Council	Winner
Worst Commercial	"Drinking Wrecks Lives"	Ministry of Transport	Winner – only nomination
