= I Luv You Jimmy Spud =

Play by Lee Hall

- Written by: Lee Hall
- Characters: Gus Brown as Jimmy Spud; Michael Walpert as Stephen (Scout)
- Original language: English

Premiere
- Date premiered: 1995

I luv you Jimmy Spud is a play set in Newcastle upon Tyne by British playwright Lee Hall starring Gus Brown as Jimmy Spud and Michael Walpert as Stephen (Scout). Originally commissioned by BBC Radio 4, it was first broadcast in 1995.

The play initiated the God's Country tetralogy; the other plays in the sequence are, in order:

- The Love Letters of Ragie Patel (1997)
- The Sorrows of Sandra Saint (1997)
- Spoonface Steinberg (1997)

I luv you Jimmy Spud has been made into a 2001 film Gabriel and Me starring Iain Glen and Billy Connolly as the angel Gabriel.

In the forward to the book Byker Revisited, Hall said that I Luv You Jimmy Spud was heavily influenced by photographer Sirkka-Liisa Konttinen's book, Byker.
