= The Pitmen Painters (play) =

2010 play written by Lee Hall

- Original language: English
- Written by: Lee Hall
- Setting: Ashington, 1934

Premiere
- Place: Live Theatre, Newcastle

The Pitmen Painters is a play by Lee Hall based on the Ashington Group of painters. Following a sellout run at both the Live Theatre, Newcastle upon Tyne in 2007 and its transfer to the Royal National Theatre, it returned to the National for a limited season before heading out on a UK Tour. A Broadway production opened on 30 September 2010 following previews from 14 September 2010 at the Samuel J. Friedman Theatre and played a limited run until 12 December 2010; it featured the original cast. The Pitmen Painters opened in London's West End in October 2011 at the Duchess Theatre. The Canadian premiere of The Pitmen Painters ran in February 2012 at Theatre Aquarius in Hamilton, Ontario.

== Background ==
Hall learnt about the group from a Guardian article by Martin Wainwright. This encouraged him to buy the book "Pitmen Painters: The Ashington Group 1934-1984" by William Feaver about the group, on which the play is loosely based.

== Other productions ==
A February 2014 production by United Players at the Jericho Theatre in Vancouver sold out many of its performances. A Spanish adaption "Mineros" has been performed at the Metropolitan Theater in Buenos Aires, Argentina.

== Cast ==
- Christopher Connel
- Michael Hodgson
- Ian Kelly
- Brian Lonsdale
- Lisa McGrillis
- Deka Walmsley
- David Whitaker
- Phillippa Wilson

== Creative team ==
- Director – Max Roberts
- Designer – Gary McCann
- Lighting Designer – Douglas Kuhrt
- Sound Designer – Martin Hodgson
