= Becky Simpson =

British actress

- Born: Rebecca Simpson; 10 August 1986 (age 39); Manchester, United Kingdom
- Occupations: Actress, writer, musician
- Years active: 1997 – present
- Website: http://www.beckysimpson.com

Becky Simpson (born 10 August 1986) is a Manchester-born actress, writer and musician who now lives in the Calderdale area of West Yorkshire. In 1997, Simpson won the BBC Talkie of the Year award for her role in Spoonface Steinberg.

== Personal life ==
Simpson was born to parents in the entertainment industry. Her mother, Diane Whitley, had spent several years as an actress and was encouraged to go into writing through her playwright husband Dave Simpson. Simpson's two half uncles – Jim and Jeff – later went on to become successful football players at Manchester City.

== Education ==
Simpson graduated from Leeds University in 2004 with an arts degree in Creative Writing.

== Career ==
Simpson's first acting role came in a radio adaptation of The Little Princess in 1997.

=== Spoonface Steinberg ===
In 1997, she was offered the role of Spoonface Steinberg in a 60-minute monologue for BBC Radio 4. The play was written by Lee Hall (who went on to write Billy Elliot) and was about a young Jewish autistic girl dying of cancer. The play later won the Talkie of the Year award and Best Drama of 1997.

Spoonface Steinberg provided important exposure for Simpson, leading to her first TV role in See How They Run – a six-part CBBC series about a family on the run from gangsters. The series was part-filmed in London and Australia and featured Neighbours star Peter O'Brien.

=== Further roles ===
Simpson's exposure in Spoonface Steinberg led to further TV roles in Doctors, Always and Everyone and Peak Practice. She also played Puck in a radio adaptation of William Shakespeare's A Midsummer Night's Dream, starring alongside Richard Griffiths. In other roles she appeared with future Doctor Who star Christopher Eccleston in Pig Paradise and Ricky Tomlinson in The Virgin of Liverpool. Her most recent television role was in Peak Practice.

=== Music ===
Aside from acting, Simpson is a musician, having regularly performed at the Cavern Club in Liverpool. It was here that Simpson met Wes Paul (the then compere) before undertaking musical pursuits with him at the Star Club, Hamburg, and in Calderdale. Simpson married Paul on 1 June 2010 in Jackson, Tennessee. She recorded the Johnny Cash song "Jackson" to coincide with the wedding. The final master was released and featured on ReverbNation in August 2010.

== Filmography ==
=== Television series ===
- 2001 Doctors - Donna Kingston. 1 episode.
- 2002 Peak Practice - Rachel Henderson. 1 episode.
