= Pegswood =

Village in Northumberland, England

Coordinates: 55.1798°N 1.6442°W

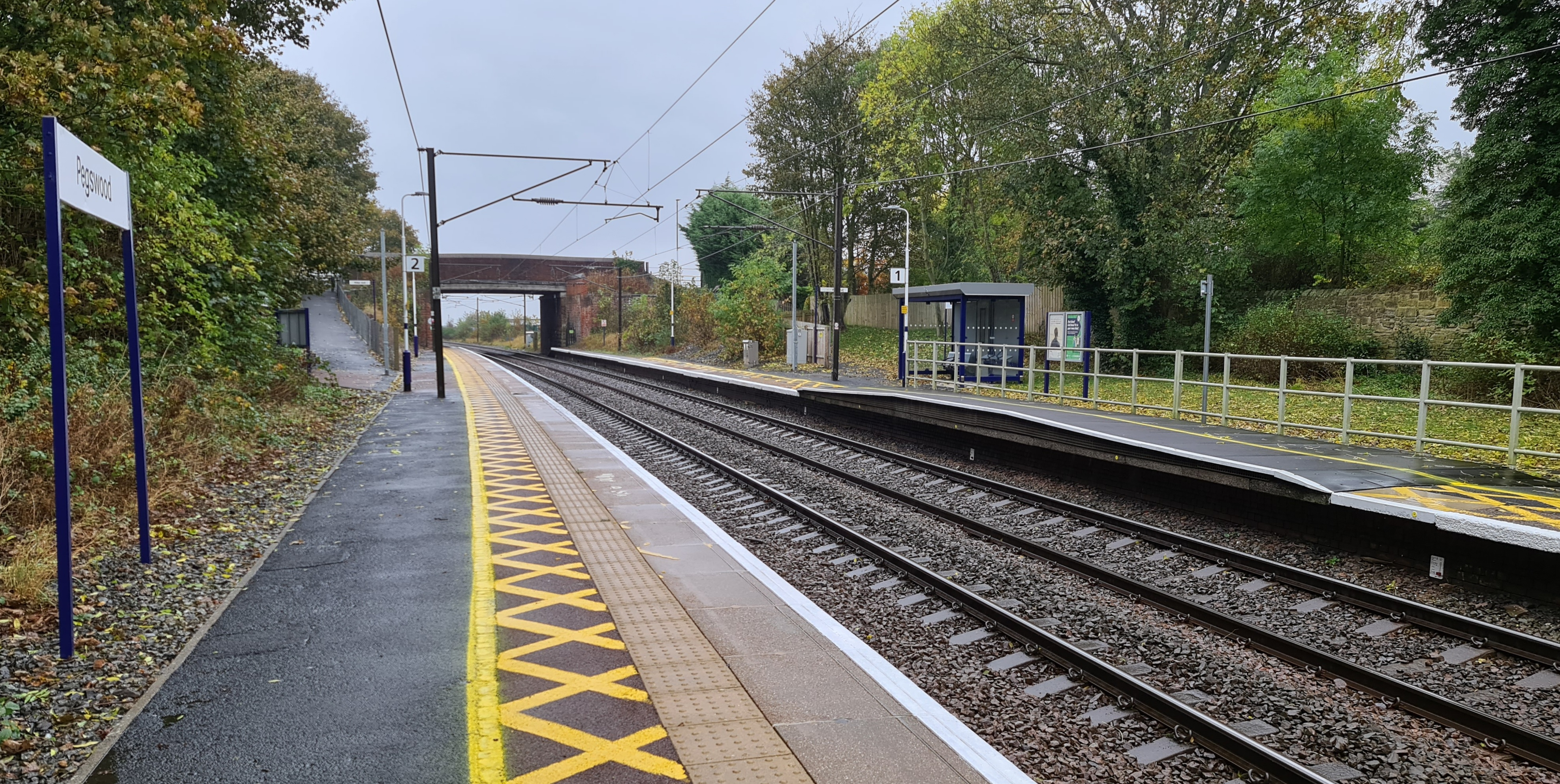
- Pegswood railway station

- Location within Northumberland
- Population: 3,280 (2011 Census)
- OS grid reference: NZ226873
- Unitary authority: Northumberland
- Ceremonial county: Northumberland
- Region: North East
- Country: England
- Sovereign state: United Kingdom
- Post town: MORPETH
- Postcode district: NE61
- Dialling code: 01670
- Police: Northumbria
- Fire: Northumberland
- Ambulance: North East
- UK Parliament: North Northumberland

Pegswood is a historic mining village and civil parish in Northumberland, England, and the site of the former Pegswood Colliery. Pegswood is two miles (3 km) east of Morpeth and three miles (5 km) west of Ashington, with a population of around 3,280. Pegswood is on a small hill above the valley in which Morpeth is situated, close to the River Wansbeck and to the small stream Brocks Burn.

== History ==
The prevailing theory as to the origin of the name Pegswood is that it means Pecg's Enclosure, Pecg being a personal name. Another theory is that the element Peg- derives from the Anglo-Saxon word pecg meaning pig. Pegswood started as a small farming settlement, yet with the discovery of coal and the opening of Pegswood colliery, the village expanded to accommodate miners in 1872. The colliery shut in 1969, however the village is still classed as a pit village. All that is left today are the Pit Heap, now a park, and the entrance to the mine shaft, now in the Bothal Court estate. Coinciding with the coal industry, there was also a brickworks in Pegswood, which has since closed down.

Though the original colliery closed, mining was practised until quite recently: as late as 1997, mining company The Banks Group opened up a 170-acre (0.69 km^{2}) open-pit mine at Pegswood Moor, from which they extracted some 1.4 million tons of coal, with the help of a 236-ton face shovel made by Orenstein & Koppel. Also reaped was 84,000 tons of fire clay, a kind of high temperature resistant clay often found between coal layers. Mining there stopped in 2004, and the pit was converted into the Pegswood Community Park, which includes "a dedicated nature reserve, a new woodland and ponds." The second phase of the park's construction would also "provide a fishing lake, an amphitheatre sculpted out of the landform and a footpath link from Pegswood to Morpeth." Extensive open-pit mining still takes place in the area, but such operations remain controversial even when former sites are restored.

Like many other "former pit villages," Pegswood has benefited from increased interest among especially young families, who are attracted to such places for the countryside and the quality of education. Since 1969, when the pit closed, the town has welcomed new development plans and new housing estates have been built in an effort by Pegswood to "reinvent itself as a cheaper rural alternative to Morpeth and Newcastle." More recent renewal efforts include plans for a facelift for its Welfare Centre and a £48,000 garden with the colliery as its theme. Local services are also being improved.

== Pegswood colliery ==
The existence of coal is attested in documentation dating from 1754. The Pegswood colliery was one of many in the north-east of England. The colliery opened ca. 1872 and was in operation until 1969. Acquired by the S.H. Fraser company in the 1880s, in 1947 the National Coal Board took over, following the 1946 Coal Industry Nationalisation Act. Starting in 1914, fire clay began to be produced besides coal. The colliery never had more employees than in 1921, with 857 employed underground and 182 above. No mining disasters (more than five dead) have happened; an incomplete list of mining deaths lists 54 fatalities.

== Architecture ==
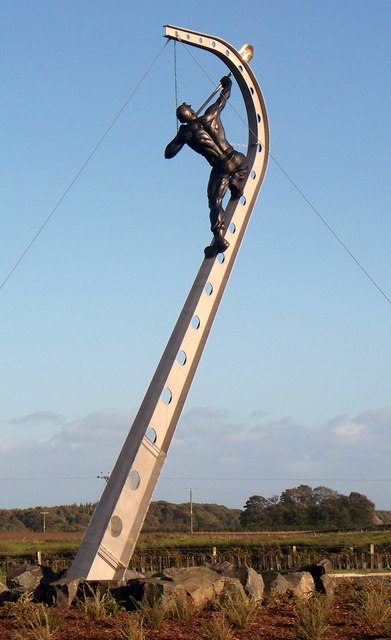
'Fire' sculpture, dubbed Robin of Pegswood

Some typical colliery-style houses from the late nineteenth century still exist in Pegswood however half of these have now been demolished to make way for new luxury housing near the local pit heap or Colliers Hill as it has now been dubbed.. Three noteworthy eighteenth-century houses remain, as well as a few remains from a fifteenth-century chapel. There is also a bridge over the East Coast Main Line.

In 2010, a sculpture funded by Welbeck Estates was erected on the Bothal Roundabout. Officially called 'Fire', but dubbed Robin of Pegswood, a bronze figure stands near the top of a stainless steel girder. The girder juts from the ground at an angle and its tip is curved into the shape of a bow with the bronze figure firing a "shovelled" arrow from it. Northumberland County Council has now installed lighting to enhance its night time viewing

== Governance ==
An electoral ward in the same name exists. This ward stretches north to Stobswood and West Chevington, east to the boundary of Ashington, west to Benridge and Causey Park and south to Fairmoor and Morpeth. The total electorate is approximately 3,900. The current County Councillor is Vicky Oakley (Labour) who was elected in May 2025.

== Religion ==
There is a single church in Pegswood, St. Margaret's. A former church has been converted into housing, after previously serving as an off-license.

== Education ==
There is only one school in Pegswood, Pegswood Primary School. Secondary education is typically taken in either Ashington or Morpeth, the two closest towns.

== Transport ==
Pegswood is served by Pegswood railway station on the East Coast Main Line. Rail services link Pegswood to Morpeth, Cramlington and Newcastle. Arriva North East run bus services to Morpeth, Ashington, Alnwick and Newcastle.

Pegswood lies on the A197 road, at the same distance from Morpeth as from Ashington. In 2007 a £9 million bypass was built to the south that removed about half of the traffic through the village. The bypass also necessitated a bridge, which is made from "the same weathering steel as the Angel of the North". Ironically, the man who fought for thirty years to have the bypass built, the then Parish Council chairman Jim Burley, was the first person to crash on it, in 2007: he was not seriously hurt.

== Notable residents ==
- Billy Kidd, football player

== Television Filming ==
Some scenes on the 1996 TV Drama Our Friends in the North featuring the Metropolitan Police aggressively dealing with strikers during the UK miners' strike (1984–1985) were filmed in Pegswood. These can be seen in Episode 7 (set in 1984) at 21m 04s and 26m 26s.
