= Colin Ayre =

English footballer (1956–2023)

Personal information
- Date of birth: 14 March 1956
- Place of birth: Ashington, Northumberland, England
- Date of death: 10 September 2023 (aged 67)
- Place of death: Morpeth, England
- Position: Winger

Youth career
- ?–1973: Newcastle United

Senior career*
Years	Team	Apps	(Gls)
1973–1975	Newcastle United	0	(0)
1975–1976	Telstar	18	(3)
1976	Torquay United	2	(0)
1976–1977	Ashington		
1978–1980	Telstar	63	(9)
1980–1982	Wacker Innsbruck	18	(5)
1982–?	SPG Raika Innsbruck		
- * Club domestic league appearances and goals

Colin Ayre (14 March 1956 – 10 September 2023) was an English professional footballer, playing as a winger in the English, Dutch and Austrian football leagues.

Colin Ayre began his career as an apprentice at Newcastle United, turning professional in September 1973. However, he failed to break into the first team at St. James' Park, leaving without making a first-team appearance.

In the 1975 close season he joined Dutch side Telstar and scored twice on his debut on 17 August 1975 as Telstar won 5–1 away to Excelsior. He scored a further goal in his third game and was a regular until early November, after which time he played only sporadically.

In September 1976, Torquay United rekindled Ayre's hopes of an English league career, his league debut coming on 18 September against Bradford City at Plainmoor. This was however followed by only one more league appearance, at home to Brentford a week later, before Ayre left to join his hometown side Ashington.

By 1979–80 he was back at Telstar and in November 1980, he joined Austrian side Wacker Innsbruck, helping them to the Austrian second division title in his first season. He played 18 times in total, before leaving in February 1982, joining Austrian second division side SPG Raika Innsbruck.

Colin Ayre died in Morpeth on 10 September 2023, at the age of 67.
