= Ashington Colliery Junction railway station =

Former railway station in Northumberland, England

Ashington Colliery Junction

General information
- Location: Ashington, Northumberland; England
- Coordinates: 55.1862°N 1.6316°W
- Grid reference: NZ235880

Other information
- Status: Disused

History
- Original company: North Eastern Railway
- Pre-grouping: North Eastern Railway

Key dates
- December 1871: Opened (first appearance in timetable)
- September 1878: Closed
Location

Ashington Colliery Junction railway station served the town of Ashington, Northumberland, England from 1871 to 1878 on the York, Newcastle and Berwick Railway.

== History ==
The station opened in December 1871 by the North Eastern Railway. The station was situated at the junction line with the mineral line to Ashington Colliery. There was no road access nearby so the station must have been used for railway staff or colliery workers. In 1877 the only train to call at the station was at 3:30pm on Saturdays. The last train to call was in August 1878 and the station closed in September 1878. In June 1878 a station called 'Hirst' had opened on the Newbiggin Branch. This must have obsoleted Ashington Colliery Junction due to them being only 100 yards apart from each other.

Preceding station	Historical railways	Following station
Pegswood; Line open, station open	North Eastern Railway; York, Newcastle and Berwick Railway	Longhirst; Line open, station closed
