= Widdrington railway station =

Railway station in Northumberland, England

Widdrington
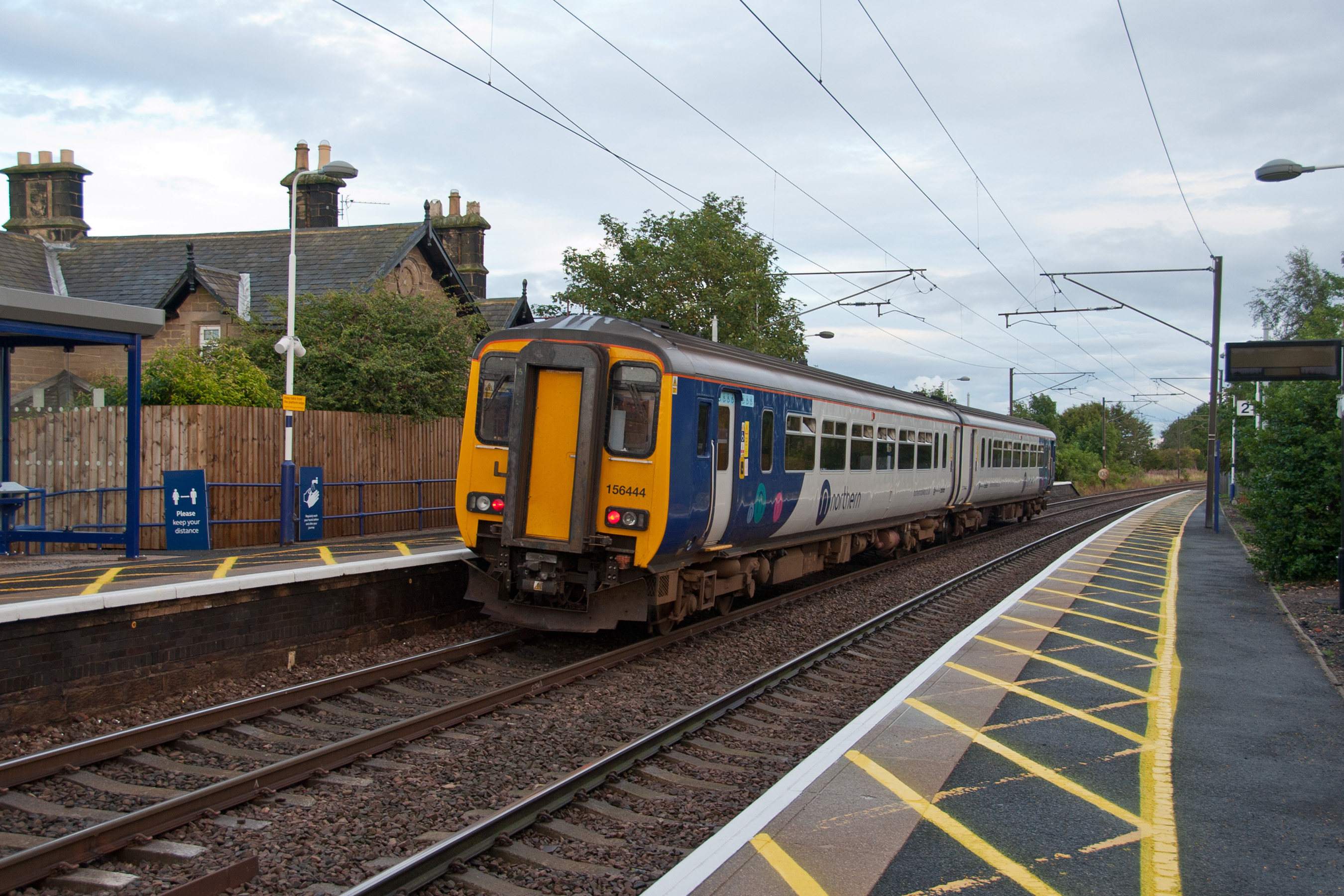

General information
- Location: Widdrington Station, Northumberland; England
- Coordinates: 55°14′28″N 1°36′58″W
- Grid reference: NZ244941
- Owner: Network Rail
- Manager: Northern Trains
- Platforms: 2

Other information
- Station code: WDD
- Classification: DfT category F2

History
- Original company: Newcastle and Berwick Railway
- Pre-grouping: North Eastern Railway
- Post-grouping: London and North Eastern Railway; British Rail (North Eastern Region)

Key dates
- 1 July 1847: Opened

Passengers
- 2021/22: ▲2,038
- 2022/23: ▲2,492
- 2023/24: ▼2,270
- 2024/25: ▲2,652
- 2025/26: ▼2,190
Location
- Location within Northumberland
Notes
- Passenger statistics from the Office of Rail and Road

Widdrington is a railway station on the East Coast Main Line, which runs between London King's Cross and Edinburgh Waverley. The station, situated 23 miles 20 chains (23.2 mi; 37.4 km) north of Newcastle, serves the villages of Stobswood and Widdrington Station in Northumberland, England. It is owned by Network Rail and managed by Northern Trains.

== History ==
The station was opened by the Newcastle and Berwick Railway on 1 July 1847.

An average of 3 or 4 stopping services each way per day ran between Newcastle and Edinburgh Waverley via Berwick-upon-Tweed until the late 1980s. Following the electrification of the East Coast Main Line, these services were curtailed at Berwick-upon-Tweed. Services were further reduced to their current level by British Rail in May 1991, due to a shortage of rolling stock.

The local rail user group, SENRUG, has been campaigning to improve service levels at the station, and at neighbouring Pegswood, since September 2016.

== Facilities ==
The station is unstaffed and has only basic amenities, consisting of a waiting shelter and a public telephone on the southbound platform and seating on the northbound platform as well as timetable poster boards on both platforms, with both platforms having wooden gates to access them at the end of the station closest to the level crossing. A ticket machine is located next to the entrance to the southbound platform entrance just beyond the gate to enter. The old station buildings survive, but are now privately occupied. Step-free access is available to both platforms via the level crossing at the north end of the station.

== Services ==
=== Northern Trains ===
As of the December 2025 timetable change, the station is currently served by just three trains per day: two southbound to Newcastle via Morpeth (one in the early morning and one in the evening) and one northbound to Chathill (in the evening).

No services call at the station on Sundays.

Rolling stock used: Class 156 Super Sprinter and Class 158 Express Sprinter

=== TransPennine Express ===
In September 2021, TransPennine Express announced that they were seeking approval to have most of the services on their new five return trains weekday semi-fast Newcastle to Edinburgh return trains call at Widdrington. As the procedure required for the operator to be recognised as meeting the safety and operational requirements necessary for calling at Widdrington were ongoing at the time of the announcement, it is possible that the service will start calling at this station at some point after its planned commencement in December 2021.

Preceding station	National Rail	Following station
Pegswood towards Newcastle via Morpeth	Northern Trains; East Coast Main Line	Acklington towards Chathill
	Historical railways	
Longhirst	North Eastern Railway; York, Newcastle and Berwick Railway	Chevington
	Future services	
Morpeth	TransPennine Express; North TransPennine	Alnmouth
