= See How They Run (TV series) =

1999 Australian-British children's television series

- Genre: Family, Children
- Written by: Al Ashton; Tim O'Mara
- Directed by: Graeme Harper
- Starring: Peter O'Brien; Anne Looby
- Composer: Mario Millo
- Countries of origin: Australia; United Kingdom
- Original language: English
- No. of seasons: 1
- No. of episodes: 6

Production
- Production location: Blue Mountains
- Running time: 25 min.

Original release
- Network: ABC
- Release: 6 June – 20 June 1999

See How They Run is an Australian-British children's television series co-produced by and aired on the BBC and ABC in 1999. Based on the children's novel of the same name by David McRobbie, it is centred on the Cassidy family, who are placed in a Witness Protection programme in Sydney, Australia after the father agreed to give evidence in a trial against some gangsters who are seeking revenge. Filmed around the Blue Mountains of New South Wales, the series is narrated by the eldest daughter, Emma.

== Cast ==
- Peter O'Brien as Don Cassidy
- Anne Looby as Lily Cassidy
- Katie Blake as Emma Cassidy
- Becky Simpson as Nicola Cassidy
- Vaughan Sevelle as Sam Foster
- Shelley King as Nina Pagetter
- Adam Ray as Roy
- Tessa Wells as Sharon Hargreaves
- Christopher Scoular as Graham Foster
- Julia Haworth as Christine
- Tessa Leahy as Miss Weston
- Brendan Donaghue as Greg
- Al Hunter Ashton as Inspector Greyson
- Lucy Maria Hopkins as WDC Arnott

== Awards ==
- 1999 Australian Film Institute Awards
  - Winner: Best Children's Television Drama (Writer Tim O'Mara)
  - Nominee: Best Direction in a Television Drama (Graeme Harper for episode 1)
- 1999 Australian Screen Music Awards
  - Winner: Best Original Music in a Children's TV or Animation Series (Mario Millo)
