= Billy Kidd (footballer) =

English footballer

Personal information
- Full name: William Kidd
- Date of birth: 31 January 1908
- Place of birth: Pegswood, England
- Date of death: 1978 (aged 69–70)
- Height: 5 ft 8 1/2 in (1.74 m)
- Position: Left back

Senior career*
Years	Team	Apps	(Gls)
- Pegswood United
1931–1947	Chesterfield	318	(2)
- * Club domestic league appearances and goals

William Kidd (31 January 1908 – 1978) was a professional footballer who played for Chesterfield for the whole of his professional career. He was born in Pegswood.
