= Woodhorn (museum) =

Museum and archives in Northumberland, England

Coordinates: 55.188°N 1.550°W

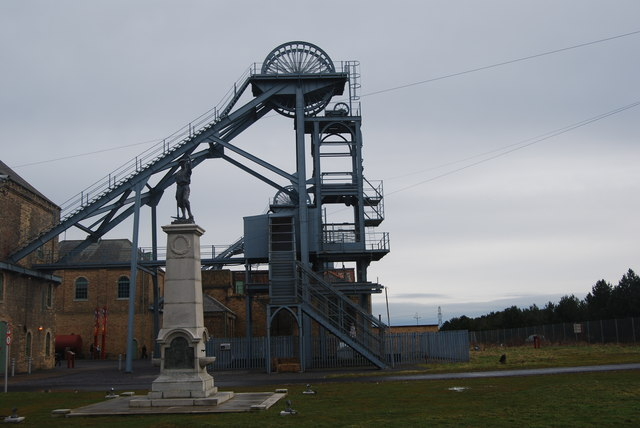
Memorial and pit head at Woodhorn

Woodhorn Museum, part of North East Museums and formerly known as Woodhorn Colliery Museum and Woodhorn Charitable Trust, is located in Ashington, Northumberland, England. The museum depicts the lives of coal mine workers and features original buildings and equipment from the former colliery, including the two headframes, a winding house, other engine houses, a steam winding engine, stables, a building with ventilation equipment, a blacksmith and joiners shop, and the office. Several buildings contain original equipment and mining exhibits, while others have been converted to museum exhibit areas or wedding, conference and event facilities.

In addition to exhibits about the mine and the life of a miner, the museum features a permanent collection of art created by the Ashington Group. There are also changing exhibits of history, art and science.

Woodhorn hosts the annual Northumberland Miner's picnic each year.

== Woodhorn Museum architecture ==
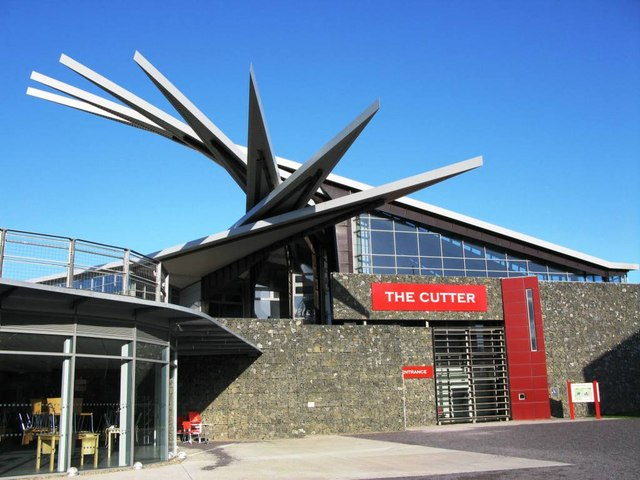
The Cutter

The museum was first opened in 1989 but following major redevelopment with chief architect Tony Kettle, the museum reopened in October 2006. Now the buildings are protected with listed status and the location is recognised as a scheduled monument as it is the most well preserved example of a late 19th- to early 20th-century colliery in the North East of England.

Kettle was inspired by monster coal cutting machines when redeveloping the new building, the Cutter, which sits alongside the original colliery buildings. The architecture and the museum contents, through displays, paintings, temporary exhibitions and archives tell Northumberland's story.

The heapsteads were refurbished in 2026.

== Woodhorn Railway ==
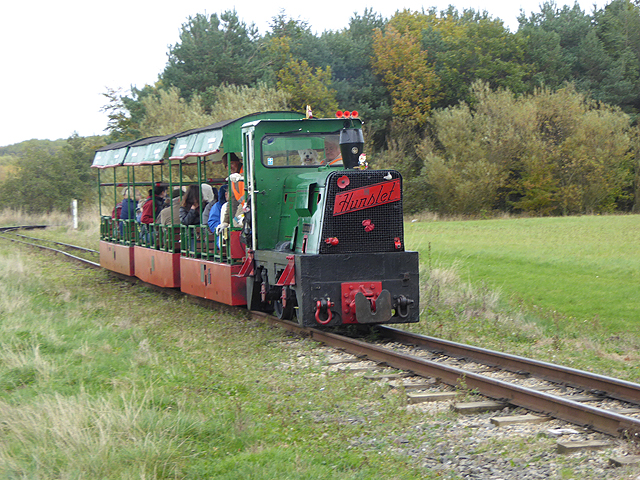
Woodhorn Narrow Gauge Railway

Woodhorn Narrow Gauge Railway is a 2 ft (610 mm) narrow gauge railway at Woodhorn in the Queen Elizabeth II Country Park. There are two preserved locomotives. One is a Hunslet Locomotive, which was built in 1975 for work at Vane Tempest colliery in Seaham. The second is a German Schoma locomotive, called Edward Stanton, which was used in the factory where the concrete sections were made for the Channel Tunnel. There are also three carriages called Eddie, Harry and Ken. They and the Schoma are named after original members of the society. The park also features a 40-acre (160,000 m^{2}) lake and hiking and biking trails.

== History ==
The original colliery in the village of Woodhorn opened in 1894 and closed in 1981. The Woodhorn Colliery Museum opened in 1989, using the original pit buildings. The pit yard was designated a scheduled monument in 1999.

From 2002-2006 new construction created a new museum building that includes the Northumberland County Archives.

The Museum joined North East Museums (formerly Tyne and Wear Archives and museums) in 2025.
