= Gabriel & Me =

2001 film by Udayan Prasad

- Film poster
- Directed by: Udayan Prasad
- Written by: Lee Hall
- Starring: Iain Glen; David Bradley; Sean Landless; Billy Connolly
- Music by: Stephen Warbeck
- Production companies: Pathé; British Screen Productions; FilmFour Productions; Samuelson Films; UK Film Council; Isle of Man Film Commission; The Film Consortium
- Distributed by: Pathé Distribution
- Release date: August 2001 (Edinburgh)
- Running time: 84 minutes
- Country: United Kingdom
- Language: English

Gabriel and Me is a 2001 film starring Iain Glen, Sean Landless and Billy Connolly as the angel Gabriel. It originated from the 1995 British play I Luv You Jimmy Spud. Some outdoor scenes were filmed in North East England including the Roker pier in Sunderland. The film premiered at the 2001 Edinburgh International Film Festival.

== Plot ==
Jimmy Spud is a young loner living in the Byker Wall. Ever since his father threw him high in the air from South Shields pier, he dreamt of being able to fly, and specifically of being an angel. He lives with his brutish but terminally ill father, played by Iain Glen, his mother (Rosie Rowell) and philosophical grandfather (David Bradley). He is bullied at school. Whilst "praying" in a derelict and abandoned church one day, Jimmy is visited by Gabriel (Billy Connolly), who advises him on how to become an angel.

He goes home and sews a multitude of feathers onto an old dress and goes wandering around the docks. We next see him on the absolute top of a tower crane, watching a boy cycling below. The boy skids and lands in the water. Jimmy sees his chance to prove himself and dives in to rescue him. The boy, a Pakistani Boy Scout, thanks him and they become friends. Jimmy practices "flying" by jumping off a plank, and is seen to hover unnaturally long, as if achieving his aim. His dad discovers the new pair of friends in the bedroom one day, with Jimmy in his "dress", he is furious and smashes a trumpet Jimmy had borrowed from school for angel practice. Jimmy's grandfather sells his homing pigeons to buy Jimmy a new trumpet.

Dad's illness (seemingly lung cancer) worsens and he goes into hospital. Jimmy is told that he will not return. He visits dad in hospital wearing his angel dress and plays Swing Low, Sweet Chariot on the trumpet. Disillusioned by his father's death he burns the angel dress. However Gabriel returns and explains that he has met his goal. The film ends with the famous throw on the jetty which inspired Jimmy so much.

== Reception ==
Gabriel & Me received negative reviews from critics. On Rotten Tomatoes, all three critical reviews are negative.
