= James Bulmer Johnson =

British army officer and award recipient (1889–1943)

James Bulmer Johnson VC
- Born: 31 December 1889; Widdrington, Northumberland
- Died: 23 March 1943 (aged 53); Plymouth, Devon
- Burial place: Efford Crematorium, Plymouth, Devon
- Military career
- Allegiance: United Kingdom
- Branch: British Army
- Rank: Second Lieutenant
- Units: The Northumberland Fusiliers
- Conflicts: First World War; Anglo-Irish War
- Awards: Victoria Cross
- Other work: Police officer

James Bulmer Johnson VC (31 December 1889 – 23 March 1943) was an English recipient of the Victoria Cross, the highest and most prestigious award for gallantry in the face of the enemy that can be awarded to British and Commonwealth forces.

He was a Second Lieutenant in the 2nd Battalion, The Northumberland Fusiliers, British Army, attached to 36th Battalion during the First World War and 28 years old when on 14 October 1918 south west of Wez Macquart, France, he performed the act for which he was awarded the VC.

During operations by strong patrols, Second Lieutenant Johnson repelled frequent counter-attacks and for six hours, under heavy fire, he held back the enemy. When at length he was ordered to retire he was the last to leave the advanced position carrying a wounded man. Three times subsequently this officer returned and brought in badly wounded men under intense enemy machine-gun fire.

After World War I, Johnson served in the Auxiliary Division of the Royal Irish Constabulary.

He died in Plymouth, Devon, in 1943 aged fifty-three, and was cremated at Efford Crematorium, Plymouth.

== The medal ==
His Victoria Cross is displayed at the Fusiliers Museum of Northumberland, Alnwick, Northumberland.

== Memorial ==
In 2018, on the hundredth anniversary of Johnson's VC award, a memorial erected by Widdrington Station and Stobswood Parish Council and Northumberland County Council, and provided by the Department of Communities and Local Government, was unveiled at Widdrington Station.

A dispute subsequently arose over the siting of the memorial stone. Widdrington Station and Stobswood Parish Council asserted that Johnson was born in Stobswood on 31 December 1889, and used the name "James Bulmer Johnson". However a local resident, and Widdrington Village Parish Council, claimed that Johnson was born in 1882 at the then Widdrington Colliery, and had no middle name. The latter parish council requested the memorial be moved to their parish. The County Council defended the location and details on the memorial stone, and referred the matter to the Ministry of Housing, Communities and Local Government.
