= Brian Carolin =

English footballer

Personal information
- Date of birth: 6 December 1939 (age 86)
- Place of birth: Ashington, England
- Position: Wing half

Youth career
- Ashington Welfare Juniors

Senior career*
Years	Team	Apps	(Gls)
1957–1960	Gateshead	17	(0)
1960–19??	Blyth Spartans	?	(?)
- * Club domestic league appearances and goals

Brian Carolin (born 6 December 1939) was an English footballer who played as a wing half.

Carolin started his career with Ashington Welfare Juniors before joining Gateshead in 1957. He made 17 appearances in three seasons for Gateshead before moving to Blyth Spartans in 1960.

== Sources ==
- "allfootballers.com".
- "Post War English & Scottish Football League A–Z Player's Transfer Database".
