= Ashington Group =

The Ashington Group was a small society of artists from Ashington, Northumberland, composed largely of mine workers. They met regularly between 1934 and 1983 to encourage their progress. Although most of the men had no formal artistic training, the Group and its work became celebrated in the British art world of the 1930s and 1940s.

== Origins ==
The Group began as the Ashington branch of the Workers' Educational Association (WEA), which first advertised a class on 'Evolution' in 1927. After taking additional evening classes in varied subjects, the group decided to study art appreciation. The WEA and Durham University arranged for a tutor, painter and teacher Robert Lyon (1894–1978), to instruct the group, but its members, mainly men employed by the Woodhorn and Ellington Collieries, quickly grew dissatisfied with the course. Lyon suggested that the group members try creating their own paintings as a means to develop an understanding and appreciation of art.

== Critical success ==
By 1936 the group - many of whose members were committed to the principles of the Independent Labour Party - had drawn up an extensive list of regulations, by which all members had to abide, and named itself the Ashington Group. They held their first exhibition at the Hatton Gallery, part of Armstrong College, Newcastle-upon-Tyne. A further exhibition was held in 1938 as an extension of the Mass Observation project.

By the early 1940s the Group had exhibited in London, and they continued to thrive after Lyon left to become the fourth Principal of Edinburgh College of Art. Lyon kept in contact with the Group's members, and wrote his MA thesis on his educational project with the Group. Over the next few years the work of the Group was noticed and praised by a number of prominent British artists and critics, such as Julian Trevelyan and Henry Moore. Their work was collected by prominent figures such as Helen Sutherland.

== Post-war ==
After World War II, critical interest in the Group waned, but the men continued to meet weekly, producing new art and taking on new members. The critic William Feaver met Oliver Kilbourn in the early 1970s, who was one of the Group's central members. Feaver helped revive interest in their work, which was restored and featured in several touring exhibitions. In the 1980s, the Group's Permanent Collection was the first exhibition of western art to be shown in China after the Cultural Revolution.

The Group's meeting hut was finally demolished in 1983; Kilbourn, the last of the Group's founding members, arranged for the paintings to be put in trust prior to his death in 1993. They are now held by Woodhorn Museum. Feaver's book about the Group, Pitmen Painters: The Ashington Group 1934-1984, has been adapted by Lee Hall as a play The Pitmen Painters.

The last surviving member of the Ashington Group John F. (Jack) Harrison, died in 2004, a few months short of his hundredth birthday.

The Permanent Collection of Ashington Group work can be seen at Woodhorn near Ashington, Northumberland.

Artist Narbi Price completed a PhD based on a study of the legacy of the Ashington Group, at Newcastle University. Price curated a new exhibition in 2018 of their work loaned from private collections, entitled Pitmen Painters Unseen.

== Prominent members of the group ==
- Oliver Kilbourn (1904–1993)
- George Blessed (1904–1997)
- Jimmy Floyd (1898–1974)
- Harry Wilson (1898–1972)
- Len Robinson (1896–1987)
- John F. Harrison (1904–2004)
- Fred Laidler (1918–1988)
- George Brownrigg (1903–1969)
- Leslie Brownrigg (1906–1978)
