= Ashington Piggeries Ltd v Christopher Hill Ltd =

Ashington Piggeries Ltd v Christopher Hill Ltd.
- Court: House of Lords
- Full case name: Ashington Piggeries Ltd v Christopher Hill Ltd.

Court membership
- Judges sitting: Charles Hodson, Baron Hodson; Kenneth Diplock, Baron Diplock; Christopher Guest, Baron Guest; Reginald Manningham-Buller, 1st Viscount Dilhorne; Richard Wilberforce, Baron Wilberforce.

Case opinions
- With respect to contracts to supply goods, while quality issues or contamination do not made a good different in definition, there is a reasonable expectation of quality where goods suppliers know the purpose of a good and have reason to know the risks. (Manningham-Buller dissenting.)

Keywords
- contract law

Ashington Piggeries Ltd v Christopher Hill Ltd. (1972; AC 441) is a UK commercial law case concerning legal liability for the damages resulting from the loss of a large number of mink given toxic feed. The heart of the case revolved around the definition of ingredients in the contract (by section 13 of the Sale of Goods Act 1893) and the expectations of the quality of those ingredients (under 14(1) and 14(2)).

In 1960, Ashington Piggeries Ltd. supplied the recipe which Christopher Hill Ltd. fulfilled, using in part ingredients it acquired from a Norwegian company, Sildemelutvalget (who had been replaced by Norsildmel by the time of trial). Many of the animals who consumed the food died from liver disease resulting from improper processing of the herring meal in the feed. Ashington Piggeries was sued by Christopher Hill for refusing to pay for the feed and countersued that Christopher Hill failed to fulfill its contractual obligations by providing poor quality ingredients that did not meet the contract's requirements. Christopher Hill in turn sued Norsildmel for failing to fulfill its contractual obligations for the same reason.

The House of Lords heard the case in February 1971, holding that while quality issues or contamination did not make an ingredient different in definition, there was a reasonable expectation of quality where ingredient suppliers knew the purpose of the ingredient and had reason to know the risks.

== Facts ==
Ashington Piggeries, a mink farm in Ashington, Dorset, devised a recipe for mink feed, contracting in 1960 with Christopher Hill to supply ingredients and compound them. The food was marketed under the name "King Size". At first, there were no problems, but in February 1961 Christopher Hill entered into a contract with Norwegian company Sildemelutvalget to supply Norwegian herring meal rather than the herring meal previously used. In July 1961, mink fed "King Size" began to die in large numbers of liver disease. Unbeknownst to the parties, the sodium nitrite preservative used in the Norwegian herring meal produced a substance, dimethylnitrosamine (DMNA), toxic to many animals, highly so to mink. None of the parties were aware that DMNA (the potential dangers of which were known, although lethal dosages were not) was present in the meal.

When Ashington Piggeries withheld payment for the feed, Christopher Hill sued, and Ashington Piggeries counterclaimed for damages which they claimed were caused by violation of the contract. According to them, Christopher Hill had supplied an ingredient not sanctioned by contract: herring meal plus DMNA. The defendants in turn sued Norsildmel (into which Sildemelutvalget had evolved) under the claim that the words "fair average quality of the season" included in the contract for the herring meal were part of the identification of the ingredient, which the herring meal in question did not meet.

The claims were based on the Sale of Goods Act 1893, specifically with references to sections 13, 14(1) and 14(2). Section 13 requires that goods sold match the description of any contract of sale. Section 14(1) and 14(2) concern the quality of the goods and the degree to which the buyer purchases the expertise of the seller in determining that quality.

In 1968, the trial court found for Ashington Piggeries against Christopher Hill and for Christopher Hill against Norsildmel. The Court of Appeal in 1969 reversed the decision, and the matter was subsequently brought before the House of Lords in 1971.

== Judgment ==
The House of Lords dismissed the section 13 concerns because the DMNA was a defect in the herring meal, and not a different ingredient. The problem, they found, was in the quality or condition of the ingredient, and not in its correct identification. The House of Lords also considered section 14(1), by which a buyer relying on the judgment or skill of a seller to provide goods for a particular purpose enters into an implicit contract that the goods are suitable for the purpose. In this case, the House affirmed that Ashington Piggeries was relying on its expertise in determining what ingredients were appropriate, but relying on Christopher Hill to obtain suitable quality ingredients to complete the recipe. Since the potential toxicity of DMNA to all animals was known and since partial reliance on a seller’s skill and judgment qualified under 14(1), the defendant—who knew the purpose of the meal in animal feed—was responsible to provide quality ingredients that were not toxic to animals.

In regards to the defendants' suit against Norsildmel, the Court of Appeal had found that the words "fair average quality of the season" were not part of the identification of the ingredient but instead a warranty as to quality. They found, too, that Norsildmel had not been retained with reliance on their judgment or skill in assessing meals for feed purposes. While Christopher Hill, Inc., would have been within its rights to reject the faulty goods, they were not able to recover compensation because the accepted goods provided were defective. The House of Lords affirmed the former but agreed with the trial court that Norsildmel had knowledge of the purpose of the meal and should have had knowledge of the potential toxicity of it for that purpose. While neither Christopher Hill nor Norsildmel were primarily in the business of feeding mink, the potential toxicity of the substance to animals in general was already known. Whether the agencies had dealt in Norwegian herring meals for the purpose of feeding mink in the past was immaterial.
