= Ashington Town Hall =

Municipal building in Ashington, Northumberland, England

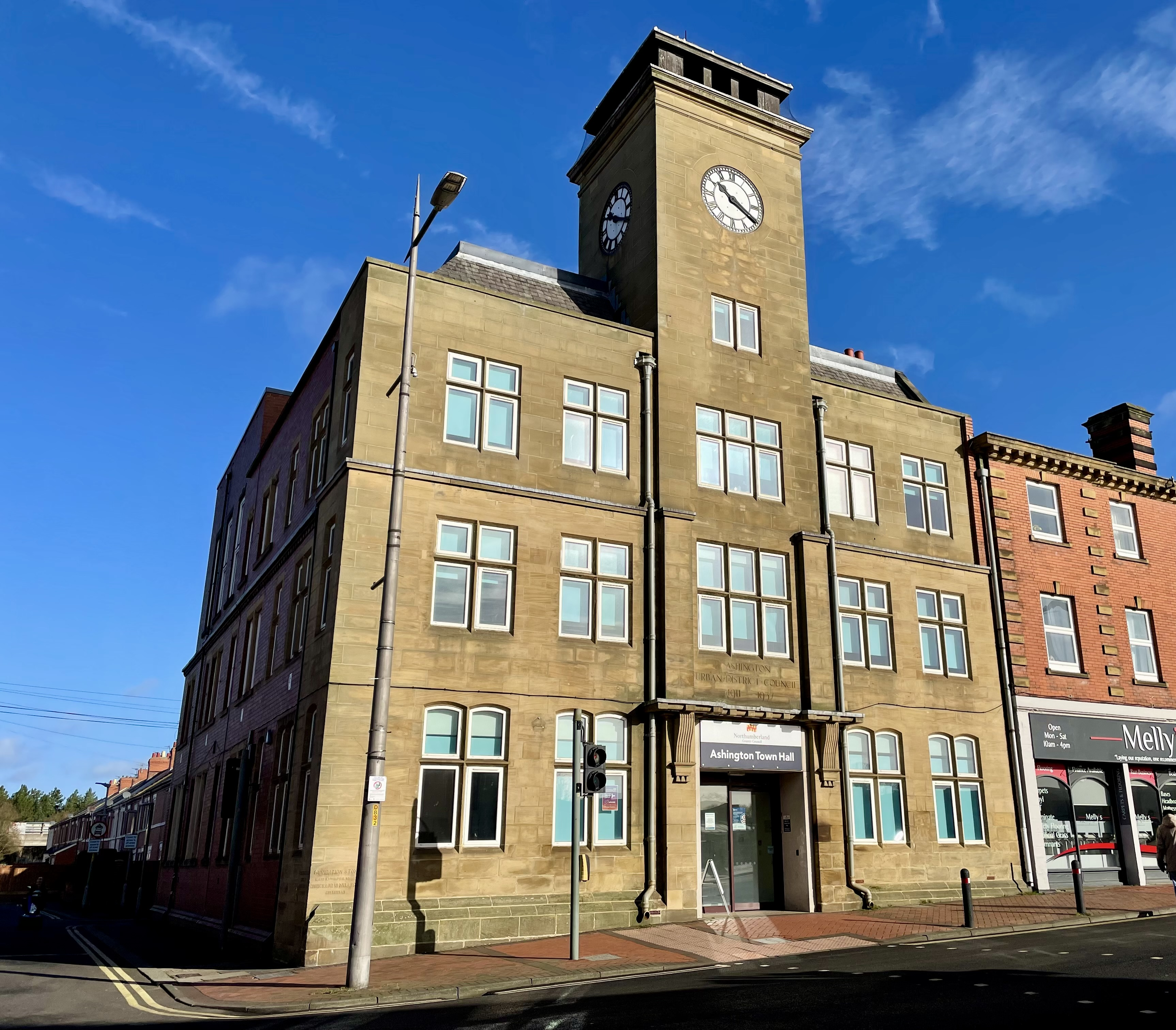
- The town hall in 2026

- Shown in Northumberland
- 55.1836°N 1.5741°W
- Location: Ashington

History
- Built: 1913

Site notes
- Architectural style: Neoclassical style

Ashington Town Hall is a municipal building in Station Road in Ashington, Northumberland, England. The town hall, which was the headquarters of Ashington Urban District Council until 1974, is now the base of Ashington Town Council.

== History ==
After significant industrial growth in the second half of the 19th century, particularly in relation to the coal industry, Ashington Urban District Council was formed in 1896. The new civic leaders decided to procure dedicated council chambers: the site chosen was open land between Ashington Colliery to the west and Ashington railway station to the east.

The foundation stone for the new building was laid by the mayor, Councillor W. Miller, on 19 April 1911. It was designed in the neoclassical style and was completed in 1913. The design involved an asymmetrical main frontage with five bays facing onto Station Road; the central bay, which slightly projected forward, featured a doorway with brackets supporting a cornice; there was a triple window on the first floor and an open pediment containing a carved garland. There was a clock tower with a lantern at the north west corner of the building, which was fitted with an hour-striking clock by Potts.

After a significant increase in the number of council employees, the council chambers were completely reconstructed at a cost of £9,000 in 1937. While the façade of the old building was retained the changes were significant: an extra floor was added, the old clock tower was demolished and a new clock tower rose from above the doorway. The clock and strike were electrified by Charles Potts & Co., and four new bells by John Taylor & Co of Loughborough were added to sound the quarter chimes. The building remained the headquarters of the urban district council for much of the 20th century and became known as Ashington Town Hall.

The footballers, Jack and Bobby Charlton, visited the building for a civic reception on 18 August 1966 to celebrate England's win in the 1966 World Cup. The building ceased to be the local seat of government when the enlarged Wansbeck District Council was formed in 1974. However, a programme of remedial works to the clock tower were completed in September 2006 and Ashington Town Council established its base in the building shortly after it was formed in 2010. A further programme of refurbishment works for the interior of the building was completed in September 2014.
