= Ashington End =

Hamlet in the East Lindsey district of Lincolnshire, England

Coordinates: 53.176600°N 0.30219°E

- Location within Lincolnshire
- OS grid reference: TF539668
  - London: 115 mi (185 km) S
- District: East Lindsey
- Shire county: Lincolnshire
- Region: East Midlands
- Country: England
- Sovereign state: United Kingdom
- Post town: Skegness
- Postcode district: PE24
- Police: Lincolnshire
- Fire: Lincolnshire
- Ambulance: East Midlands
- UK Parliament: Boston and Skegness

Ashington End is a hamlet in the East Lindsey district of Lincolnshire, England. It is situated 3 miles (5 km) north-west from Skegness.
