= Longhirst railway station =

Disused railway station in Northumberland, England

Longhirst
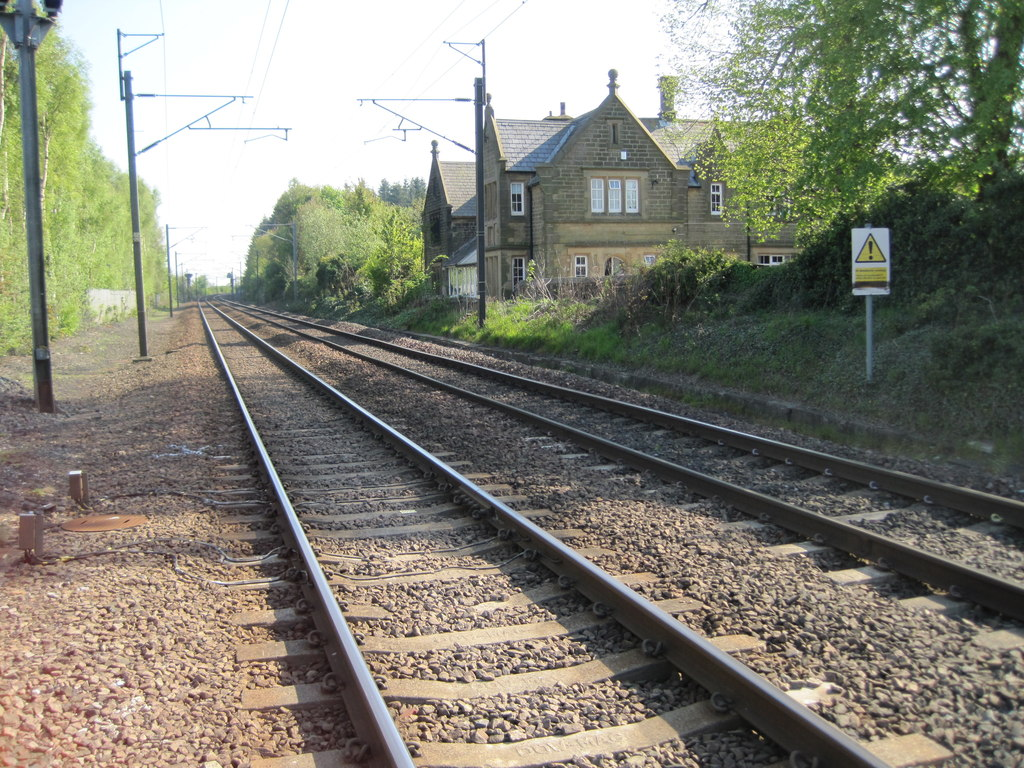
- The site of the station, looking southwest towards Pegswood, in 2010

General information
- Location: Longhirst, Morpeth; England
- Coordinates: 55.1996°N 1.6269°W
- Grid reference: NZ238895
- Platforms: 2

Other information
- Status: Disused

History
- Original company: York, Newcastle and Berwick Railway
- Pre-grouping: North Eastern Railway
- Post-grouping: London and North Eastern Railway; British Rail (North Eastern)

Key dates
- 1 July 1847: Opened
- 29 October 1951: Closed to passengers
- 10 August 1964: Closed completely
Location

Longhirst railway station served the village of Longhirst, Morpeth, England from 1847 to 1964 on the East Coast Main Line.

== History ==
The station was opened on 1 July 1847, by the York, Newcastle and Berwick Railway. The station was situated south of the level crossing on an unnamed lane one mile away from Longhirst village. Two sidings were located to the south of the station, one of them serving a lime depot. In the 1937-1938 LNER winter timetable, it was shown that the frequency of train departures had decreased since the NER days. Passenger traffic continued to decline and the station closed for passengers on 29 October 1951. The platforms were demolished in 1957 but goods traffic continued to be handled until 10 August 1964 when the station closed completely.

Preceding station	Historical railways	Following station
Ashington Colliery Junction; Line open, station closed	North Eastern Railway; York, Newcastle and Berwick Railway	Widdrington; Line and station open
