= Longhirst =

Village in Northumberland, England

Coordinates: 55.195832°N 1.6479982°W

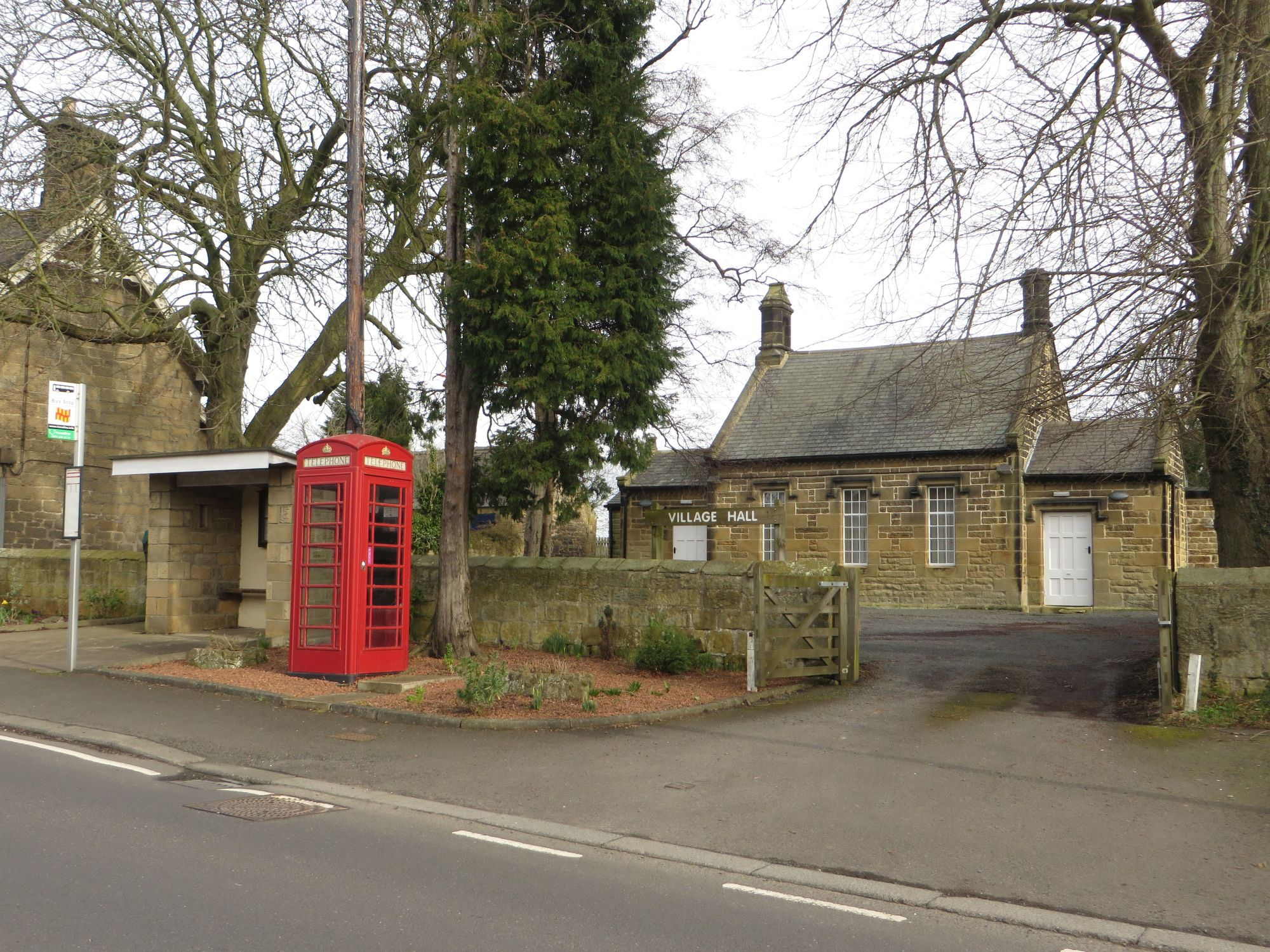
- Longhirst Village Hall

- Location within Northumberland
- Area: 11.0487 km^{2} (4.2659 sq mi)
- Population: 310 (2011 census)
  - Density: 28/km^{2} (73/sq mi)
- Civil parish: Longhirst
- Unitary authority: Northumberland
- Shire county: Northumberland
- Region: North East
- Country: England
- Sovereign state: United Kingdom
- Post town: Morpeth
- Postcode district: NE61
- UK Parliament: Wansbeck

Longhirst is a village and civil parish in Northumberland, England, located approximately 2.5 miles (4.0 km) northeast of the town of Morpeth. It originally developed as an estate village serving Longhirst Hall, a Grade II* listed building built in 1824 by architect John Dobson for landowner William Lawson. The Lawson family became rich after the discovery of coal on their land, leading to the opening of Longhirst Colliery, which operated from 1868 to 1896. After use as a school and conference centre, Longhirst Hall has now been converted to private apartments. The village was formerly served by Longhirst railway station, on the Newcastle to Berwick line, from 1847 to 1951. Formerly part of the parish of Bothal since Norman times, Longhirst became a separate parish in 1875. The name "Longhirst" means 'Long wooded hill'.
