= Lee Hall (playwright) =

British writer

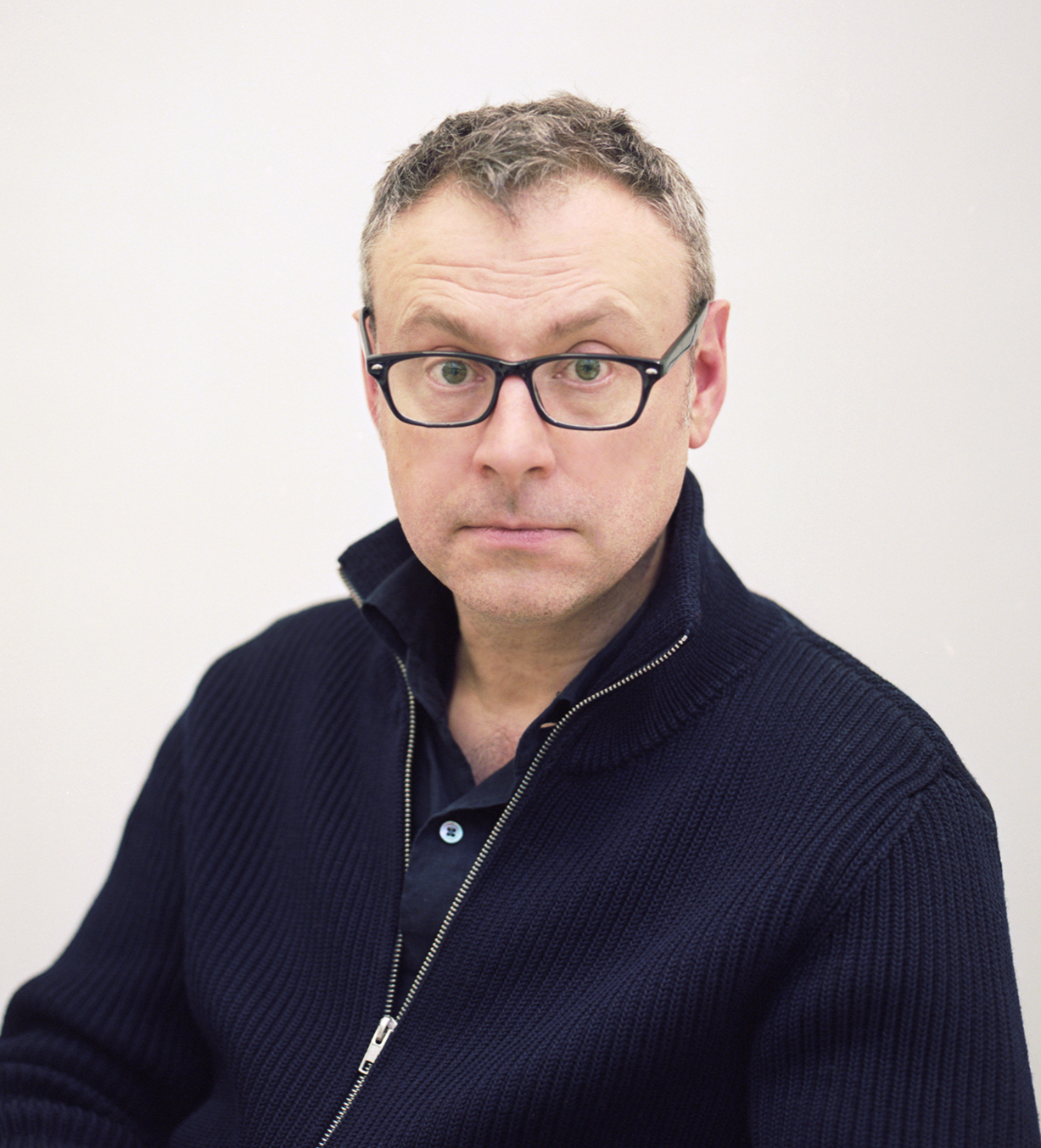
- Born: 20 September 1966 (age 59); Newcastle upon Tyne, England
- Education: Fitzwilliam College, Cambridge (BA)
- Occupation: Writer
- Spouse: Beeban Kidron (m. 2003)

Lee Hall (born 20 September 1966) is an English writer and lyricist. He is best known for writing the screenplay for the film Billy Elliot (2000) and the book and lyrics for its adaptation as a stage musical of the same name. In addition, he wrote the play The Pitmen Painters (2007), and the screenplays for the films War Horse and Rocketman (2019).

== Early life ==
Hall was born in 1966 in Newcastle upon Tyne, the son of a house painter and decorator and a housewife. He was educated at Benfield School in Walkergate. As a youth he went to Wallsend Young People's Theatre along with Deka Walmsley, Mark Scott and Trevor Fox. Walmsley later appeared in two of Hall’s works, Billy Elliot and The Pitmen Painters.

Hall went up to Fitzwilliam College, Cambridge, where he read English literature and was taught by poet Paul Muldoon.

After leaving Cambridge, he worked as a youth theatre fundraiser in Newcastle and at the Gate Theatre in London. In 1997, his playwriting career was launched with the broadcast of his radio play, Spoonface Steinberg, on BBC Radio 4.

== Career ==
Hall's most commercially successful work is Billy Elliot, the story of a North Eastern English boy who, in the face of opposition from his family and community, aspires to be a ballet dancer. The inspiration for the screenplay was drawn, in part, from the A. J. Cronin novel The Stars Look Down, which is also set in an English coal mining community during a strike, and similarly tells the story of a miner's son who goes against the grain. The character Billy was also partly inspired by the renowned baritone Sir Thomas Allen who came from a similar background, having been born in the North East's County Durham. Initially a 2000 film directed by Stephen Daldry, for which Hall wrote the screenplay, and for which he received an Academy Award nomination, Billy Elliot was later turned into a stage musical, with music by Elton John and lyrics by Hall. It enjoyed a long run in the West End and opened on Broadway in 2008. It won Hall the 2009 Tony Award for Best Book of a Musical.

Also successful was Spoonface Steinberg, the tale of a young autistic Jewish girl who is dying of cancer. The last in a quartet of radio plays entitled God's Country, the monologue aroused an unprecedented listener response when it was broadcast in 1997 on BBC Radio. It was subsequently voted one of the ten best radio dramas of all time by readers of the magazine Radio Times. Spoonface Steinberg was adapted as a television play and into a one woman show starring 42-year-old actress Kathryn Hunter. The play opened in 1999 and later transferred to the West End.

Hall had more limited success with his comedy Cooking with Elvis, the protagonist of which is an Elvis Presley impersonator who has been paralyzed in a car crash. It was originally a 1995 radio play but it became a stage play in 1999. Hall's fondness for moving from one medium to another can also be seen in his work I Luv You Jimmy Spud, which began as a 1995 radio play and was later adapted by Hall into a stage play and a film, Gabriel and Me, starring Billy Connolly and Iain Glen.

He has also translated plays by Carlo Goldoni, Bertolt Brecht and Herman Heijermans and co-written the screenplays for adaptations of Jane Austen's Pride & Prejudice and Kenneth Grahame's The Wind in the Willows.

Hall's play, The Pitmen Painters, inspired by art critic William Feaver's book on the Ashington Group, premiered at the refurbished Live Theatre in Newcastle upon Tyne in 2007. It tells of a group of miners from Ashington, Northumberland, who decide to learn about art and begin to paint. The production later transferred to the National Theatre in London and opened on Broadway in September 2010. It won the 2008 Evening Standard Award for Best Play.

In 2011, controversy arose over a children's opera that Hall had written, called Beached. The opera was commissioned by Opera North and was to have been performed by children from Bay Primary School in Bridlington, East Riding of Yorkshire. The story is about a gay retired painter, a single father who tries to spend a quiet day at the seaside with his son, but who is interrupted by children on a school trip, dogs, a landscape painter, an amateur dramatic society and others. After rehearsals had been going on for six months, the school threatened to pull the children out of the production if changes were not made to the libretto. Hall changed some words to accommodate their requests, but school officials, supported by Opera North, insisted on the removal of the words "I'm queer" and "I prefer a lad to a lass," and other references to the character being gay. The school eventually agreed to let the children perform if Hall changed "queer" to "gay."

Hall was the original writer on the screenplay for a film adaptation of Michael Morpurgo's War Horse; he shares credit on the finished film with Richard Curtis, who was brought in by Steven Spielberg. His most recent TV work is an adaptation of Nigel Slater's Autobiography Toast, starring Helena Bonham Carter and Freddie Highmore and set in Wolverhampton, West Midlands. First broadcast on BBC One in December 2010, Toast received a gala at the 2011 Berlin Film Festival and was released in cinemas on 11 August 2011. He also worked on the screenplay for the yet-to-release Working Title film Hippie Hippie Shake, based on Richard Neville's memoir Hippie Hippie Shake: The Dreams, the Trips, the Trials, the Love-ins, the Screw Ups: The Sixties.

Hall's other projects include a biopic of Elton John, Rocketman, released in May 2019, a stage musical adaptation of Pink Floyd's The Wall, and a film adaptation of George Orwell's 1933 memoir Down and Out in Paris and London.

== Personal life ==
Hall married film director Beeban Kidron (Baroness Kidron) in 2003. Kidron is a child rights advocate who has played a determinative role in establishing standards for online safety and privacy across the world.

== Works ==
Plays

- I Luv You Jimmy Spud (1995)
- The Love Letters of Ragie Patel (1997)
- The Sorrows of Sandra Saint (1997)
- Spoonface Steinberg (1997)
- Cooking with Elvis (1999)
- NE1 (2000)
- The Chain Play (2001)
- Child of the Snow (2005)
- Two's Company (2005)
- The Pitmen Painters (2007)
- Shakespeare in Love (2014)
- Our Ladies of Perpetual Succour (2015)
- Network (2017)

Screenplays

- Billy Elliot (2000)
- Gabriel and Me (2001)
- The Wind in the Willows (2006)
- Toast (2010)
- War Horse (2011)
- Victoria & Abdul (2017)
- Rocketman (2019)
- Cats (2019)

Musicals

- Billy Elliot the Musical (2005)
- Get Up, Stand Up! The Bob Marley Musical (2021)

Operas

- Beached (2011)

Translations

- Mr Puntila and His Man Matti by Bertolt Brecht (1998)
- A Servant to Two Masters by Carlo Goldoni (1999)
- Mother Courage and Her Children by Bertolt Brecht (2000)
- The Good Hope by Herman Heijermans (2001)

== Awards and nominations ==
Awards

- 1996 Richard Imison Award: I Luv You Jimmy Spud
- 1999 Pearson Playwrights' Scheme Award
- 2000 British Independent Film Award, Best Screenplay: Billy Elliot
- 2006 Laurence Olivier Award, Best New Musical: Billy Elliot the Musical
- 2008 Evening Standard Award, Best Play: The Pitmen Painters
- 2009 Drama Desk Award, Outstanding Book of a Musical: Billy Elliot the Musical
- 2009 Tony Award, Best Book of a Musical: Billy Elliot the Musical
- 2009 Drama League Award, Distinguished Production of a Musical: Billy Elliot the Musical (shared with Elton John)
- 2009 Outer Critics Circle Award, Outstanding New Score: Billy Elliot the Musical (shared with Elton John)
- 2017 Laurence Olivier Award, Best New Comedy: Our Ladies of Perpetual Succour
- 2020 Golden Raspberry Award, Worst Screenplay; Cats

Nominations

- 2001 BAFTA Award, Best Original Screenplay: Billy Elliot
- 2001 Academy Award, Best Original Screenplay: Billy Elliot
- 2009 Tony Award, Best Original Score: Billy Elliot the Musical (shared with Elton John)
- 2011 Satellite Award, Best Adapted Screenplay: War Horse (shared with Richard Curtis)
- 2018 Laurence Olivier Award, Best New Play: Network
- 2018 Satellite Award, Best Adapted Screenplay: Victoria & Abdul
