= Spoonface Steinberg =

1997 British radio play

Spoonface Steinberg is a play by British playwright Lee Hall, first broadcast as a dramatic monologue on BBC Radio 4 on Monday 27 January 1997. Such was the popular acclaim that the BBC repeated it on Radio 4 the following Saturday afternoon.

It began life as the fourth and final play in the God's Country series of linked radio dramas broadcast in 1997 on BBC Radio 4. However, due to its success (it went on to sell thousands of copies on cassette) it has come to overshadow the other plays in the sequence somewhat, and is commonly thought of as a standalone piece.

Spoken by a 7-year-old autistic girl who is dying from cancer, the original recording was performed by Becky Simpson (then aged 10) who won two awards for her performance. The play was subsequently published as part of the anthology Spoonface Steinberg and Other Plays in October 1997.

On 30 March 1998 the play was rebroadcast, this time on BBC TV and with images (including that of Ella Jones as Spoonface) added to the original.

A stage version, adapted by Hall himself as well the play's directors Marcello Magni and Annie Castledine, was first performed in 2000. The play featured Kathryn Hunter, at the time 42 years of age, in the title role.

The Scottish professional premiere was produced by Nomad at the Tron Theatre in 2002. Kirstin McLean played Spoonface and Mark Westbrook directed. The play has also been produced by the Nuffield Theatre Southampton, directed by Russ Tunney, starring Julie Rose Smith as Spoonface. Beggars and Kings' production directed by Michael Fentiman was performed at Theatre Clwyd 26 March 2009, starring Zoe Thorne and toured until 30 April 2009. A production by the Freerange Theatre Company, directed by Hugo Chandor and starring Rebecca Fenwick, toured the north of England and Scotland in 2013, gaining nominations for best production and best actress at the Buxton Festival fringe. together with a nomination for Best Fringe Performance at the Manchester Theatre Awards.
