= Woodhorn =

Village in Northumberland, England

Coordinates: 55.189°N 1.538°W

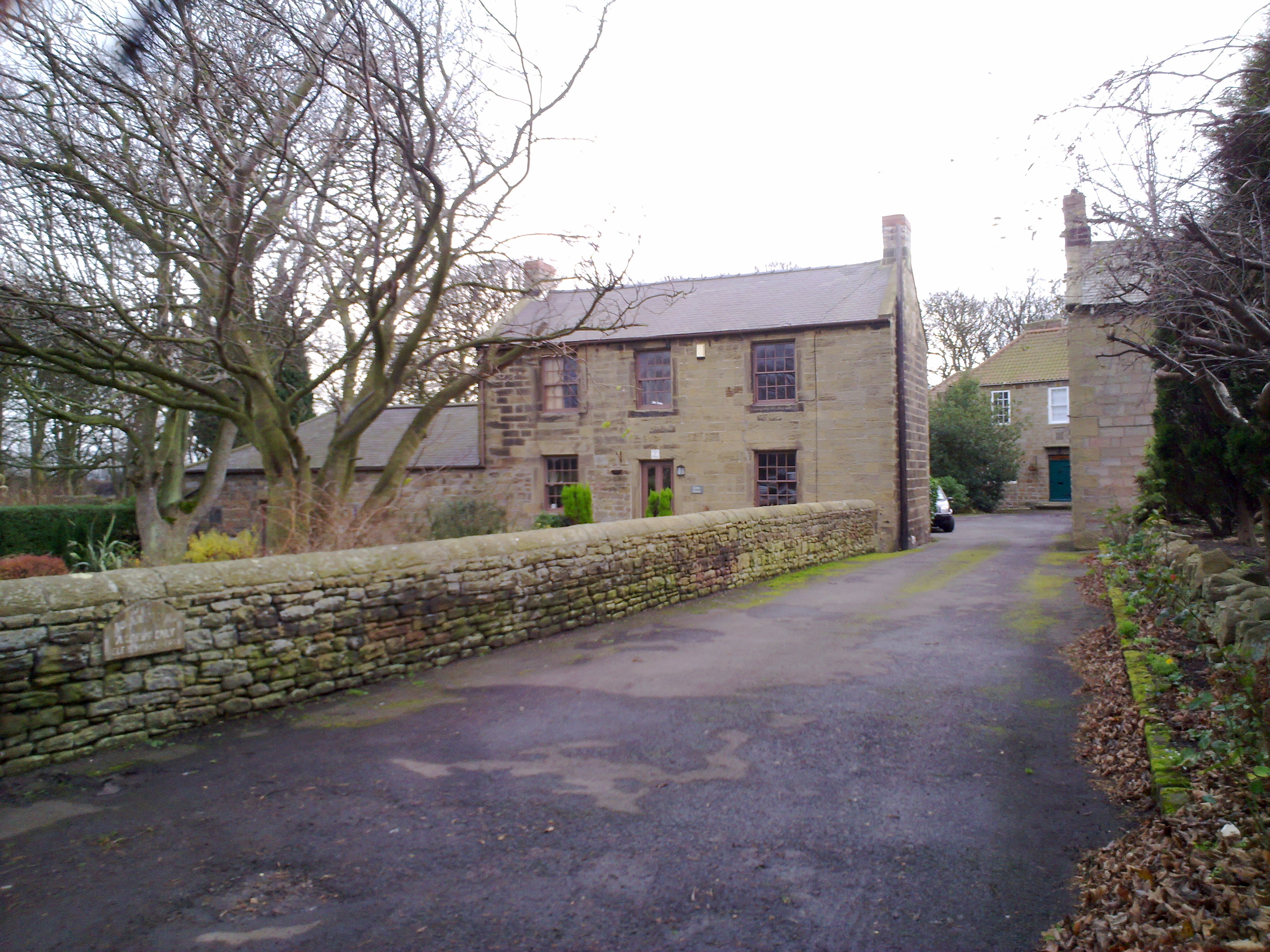

- Location within Northumberland
- OS grid reference: NZ2958
- Civil parish: Newbiggin by the Sea
- Unitary authority: Northumberland
- Ceremonial county: Northumberland
- Region: North East
- Country: England
- Sovereign state: United Kingdom
- Post town: ASHINGTON
- Postcode district: NE63
- Dialling code: 01670
- Police: Northumbria
- Fire: Northumberland
- Ambulance: North East
- UK Parliament: Wansbeck

Woodhorn is a village and former civil parish, now in the parish of Newbiggin by the Sea, in Northumberland, England, about 2 miles (3 km) east of Ashington. In 1931 the parish had a population of 219. The village is sometimes identified with Wucestre, given to St Cuthbert by King Ceolwulf when he gave up his throne in 737 to become a monk at Lindisfarne. A medieval bell at Woodhorn, inscribed "Ave Maria", is said to be one of the oldest in existence.

== Governance ==
On 1 April 1935 the parish was abolished and merged with Newbiggin by the Sea and Ashington parishes.

== Economy ==
The main employment was at the coal mine. The mine has since closed and the site has been landscaped incorporating a lake and known as Queen Elizabeth II Country Park. Some of the mine buildings have been retained and are used as a visitor centre.

== Landmarks ==
Woodhorn Colliery Museum is situated in a country park with a 40-acre (16 ha) lake. With sound effects, models, paintings, working machinery etc., the museum gives an insight into life in a local coal-mining community.

The site of the old pit is now the location for Northumberland Record Office, a purpose-built building having been constructed to replace the two previous buildings at Morpeth and Gosforth.

== Religious sites ==
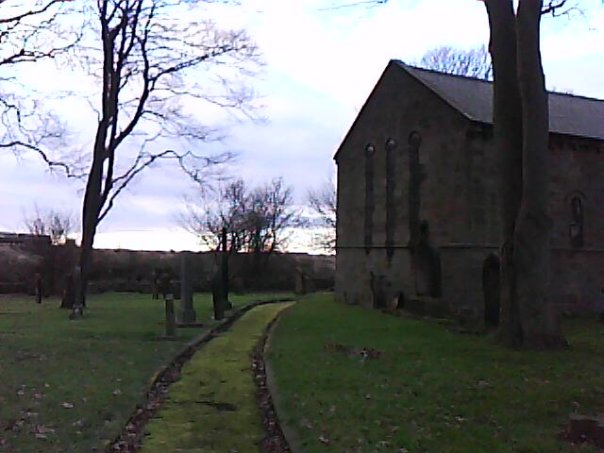
The disused Church of St Mary the Virgin, Woodhorn

The Church of St Mary the Virgin, Woodhorn (commonly known as 'Woodhorn Church') is dedicated to St Mary and is the oldest building in Wansbeck, with parts dating back to the 11th century, but has not functioned as a church since 1973. In recent decades, the building has housed at various times a museum and artists' studios. Newbiggin Town Council has set up the Woodhorn Church Working Group to discuss the future use of the now vacant building.

Woodhorn Church was once the mother church in the Parish of Woodhorn with Newbiggin. When it was declared redundant in 1973, that rôle passed to St Bartholomew's.
