= William Feaver =

British art critic, curator, artist and lecturer

William Feaver (born 1 December 1942) is a British art critic, curator, artist and lecturer. From 1975–1998 he was the chief art critic of The Observer, and from 1994 a visiting professor at Nottingham Trent University. His book The Pitmen Painters inspired the play of the same name by Lee Hall.

== Education ==
Feaver was educated at Nottingham High School and Keble College, Oxford. After graduating from Oxford he became a teacher at Newcastle's Royal Grammar School (1965–71) before being appointed the Sir James Knott Fellow at Newcastle University. He is currently an academic board member of the Royal Drawing School.

== Career as art critic ==
While at Newcastle, Feaver became the art critic of the Newcastle Journal before being appointed successively to the Listener (1971–75) and the Financial Times (1974–75) before being joining the Observer. He won the Art Critic of the Year award in 1983. Feaver conducted an interview with Lucian Freud in 1992, The artist out of cage on Freud's 70th birthday, which has been re-published in English and German in the catalog of the Museum für Moderne Kunst Frankfurt exhibition Lucian Freud: Naked Portraits.

His 2019 book, The Lives of Lucian Freud, was shortlisted for the 2019 Baillie Gifford Prize.

== Family ==
His father was the Rt Rev Douglas Feaver. In 1964 Feaver married Victoria Turton (the poet Vicki Feaver). They had one son and three daughters. He married, secondly, in 1985, Andrea Rose OBE; they have two daughters.

== Exhibitions curated ==
Feaver has curated a number of exhibitions in the UK and abroad, including:

- George Cruikshank, V&A, 1974
- Thirties, Hayward Gallery, 1979
- The Ashington Group, Beijing, 1979
- Lucian Freud exhibitions at Abbot Hall, Kendal (1996),Tate Britain and La Caixa, Barcelona (2002), Museum of Contemporary Art, Los Angeles (2002-3) and Museo Correr, Venice (2005)
- Michael Andrews, Tate Gallery, 2001
- John Constable, Grand Palais, 2002

== Books published ==
- The Art of John Martin, 1975
- When We Were Young, 1976
- Masters of Caricature, 1981
- Pitmen Painters, 1988
- Frank Auerbach, 2009
- Lucian Freud: Paintings and Etchings, 1996.
- The Lives of Lucian Freud: Youth, 2019. Also titled The Lives of Lucian Freud: The Restless Years, 1922–1968, 2019
- The Lives of Lucian Freud: Fame 1968-2011, 2021
- Lucian Freud, 2002. Revised and expanded edition expected September 28, 2026
