= Ashington =

Town and parish in Northumberland, England

Coordinates: 55.181°N 1.568°W

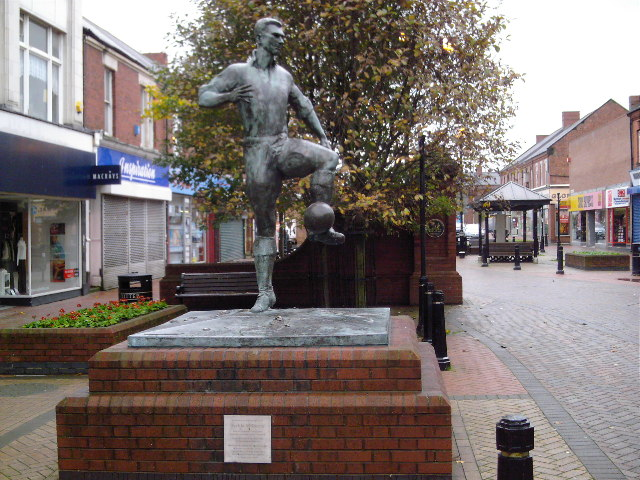
- Jackie Milburn statue, Station Road, Ashington (October 2005)

- Location within Northumberland
- Population: 28,278 (2021 census)
- OS grid reference: NZ2787
- Civil parish: Ashington
- Unitary authority: Northumberland
- Ceremonial county: Northumberland
- Region: North East
- Country: England
- Sovereign state: United Kingdom
- Post town: ASHINGTON
- Postcode district: NE63
- Dialling code: 01670
- Police: Northumbria
- Fire: Northumberland
- Ambulance: North East
- UK Parliament: Blyth and Ashington

Ashington is a town and civil parish in Northumberland, England, with a population of 27,864 at the 2011 Census. It was once a centre of the coal mining industry. The town is 15 miles (24 km) north of Newcastle upon Tyne, west of the A189 and bordered to the south by the River Wansbeck. Many inhabitants have a distinctive accent and dialect known as Pitmatic. This varies from the regional dialect known as Geordie.

== History ==
=== Toponymy ===
The name Ashington comes from the earlier form Essendene, which has been referenced since 1170. This may have originated from a given name Æsc, not unknown among Saxon invaders who sailed from Northern Germany. If so he came to the Wansbeck and would have settled in this deep wooded valley near Sheepwash. The "de" in the early orthographies more strongly suggests dene, so ash dene - these trees would have lined it. In the 1700s all that existed of Ashington was a small farm with a few dwellings around it.

=== Coal mining ===
The first evidence of mining is from bell-shaped pits and monastic mine workings discovered in the 20th Century during tunnelling. Ashington developed from a small hamlet in the 1840s when the Duke of Portland built housing to encourage people escaping the Great Famine of Ireland to come and work at his nearby collieries. As in many other parts of Britain, "deep pit" coal mining in the area declined during the 1980s and 1990s leaving just one colliery, Ellington, which closed in January 2005. In 2006 plans for an opencast mine on the outskirts of the town were put forward, although many people objected to it. During the heyday of coal-mining, Ashington was considered to be the "world's largest coal-mining village". There is now a debate about whether Ashington should be referred to as a town or a village; if considered as a village it would be one of the largest villages in England.

=== Growth of the town ===
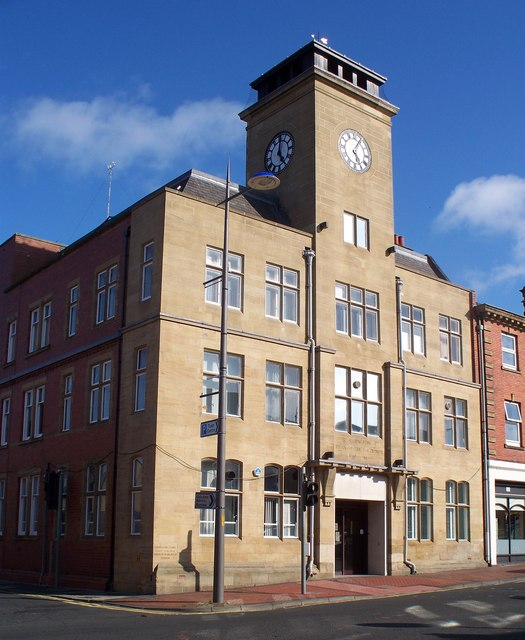
Ashington Town Hall houses the offices of Ashington Town Council.

As coal mining expanded, more people left the countryside and settled in Ashington. This led the Ashington Coal Company to build parallel rows of colliery houses. Some newcomers came from as far as Cornwall to make use of their tin-mining skills.

Ashington railway station opened in 1878, and services to Newbiggin and Tynemouth were operated by the Blyth and Tyne Railway. The nearest station to Ashington on the East Coast Main Line was Longhirst, to the north west of the town, which opened in 1847 and had services to both Newcastle and Edinburgh. By 1896, the town had grown sufficiently to warrant the creation of Ashington Urban District.

In 1913 the original Ashington Hospital was built. It was about 1/4 mile from the town centre. The hospital was expanded in the 1950s and 1960s with large new wings.

Traditionally, the area to the east of the railway was called Hirst and that to the west was Ashington proper. Although collectively called Ashington, both halves had their own park: Hirst Park (opened in 1915) in the east and the People's Park in the west.

The colliery-built houses followed a grid plan. The streets in the Hirst End running north to south were named after British trees, such as Hawthorn Road, Beech Terrace, and Chestnut Street. The east–west running streets were numbered avenues, starting with First Avenue near the town centre, finishing at Seventh Avenue towards the southern end. After the 1920s houses in Ashington were built by the council and were most often semi-detached houses, such as Garden City Villas. These occupied much of the fields in the Hirst area. New estates were built in different areas. The biggest building programme was in the late 1960s and saw Ashington extend south from Seventh Avenue opposite the Technical College towards North Seaton and south eastwards towards the A189. Some of the houses at the north end of Alexandra Road were private homes. During this building programme several new schools were built, for example Coulson Park, Seaton Hirst Middle. Community shops and a social club (the Northern) were built off Fairfield Drive. The late 1970s and early 1980s saw construction of Nursery Park opposite the North Seaton Hotel. The late 1980s and 1990s saw the building of the Wansbeck Estate between the River Wansbeck and Green Lane as well as the large Fallowfield Estate.

=== Decline of the Coal Industry ===
In 1964, as part of the Beeching Axe, Ashington railway station was closed. The site of the station was developed in the late 1960s into Wansbeck Square, housing a supermarket, council offices and a public library, built partly over the railway line.

In 1981 the Woodhorn Pit closed and its chimney was demolished. In the late 1980s this became a museum. In 1988 Ashington Pit was closed and is now occupied by a business park. In the early 2000s maisonette flats in various parts of Hirst were demolished and parts of the Moorhouse and Woodbridge estate opposite Woodhorn Pit were demolished.

The railway was used until recently by the Alcan Aluminium plant, to transport coal to its adjacent power station in the nearby town of Lynemouth. The plant closed in late 2015. The line was put in use again from mid-2017 to transport materials to Lynemouth, for the conversion of the coal-fired power station to produce power from biomass.

In October 2008, plans to opencast 2m tonnes of coal in Ashington were approved. UK Coal's plans which were first submitted in 2005, would create 60+ jobs.

== Geography ==
Ashington is in south east Northumberland, which is a largely urban area adjacent to Newcastle. Most of the area is of flat ground formed during the Carboniferous period when ancient tropical swamp forests were buried and formed the coal seams that have given this area its significance. The local geology is of yellow sandstone. The land to the north west of the town is slightly undulating due to mining subsidence, which sometimes causes farmland to be flooded. The south east part of the town is slightly raised giving views to the north. From certain parts of town the Cheviot Hills are visible about 30 miles (48 km) to the north.

The town is roughly square in shape, lying north to south. The town centre is in the north of the town. South of this are residential areas. Farmland is on both east and west flanks. The south part is residential bordered by the River Wansbeck to the south. To the east of the town is the coastal town of Newbiggin and to the west is the small village of Bothal, also on the River Wansbeck. South of the town is the small village of North Seaton which once had its own pit. North of the town about 2 miles is the village of Linton and north east of the town is Lynemouth.

To the north of the town is Queen Elizabeth II Country Park which contains a lake surrounded by pine woodland plantation. The original Ashington Colliery was on the north west of the town and the smaller Woodhorn Pit was on the north east.

=== Climate and soil ===
The climate is cool temperate. Summers are drier than on the west coast of Britain, but cooler than southerly areas. Winters are cold at times, sometimes with snow. The soil is of a dark brown colour, free draining and gritty. It is very good for growing vegetables. Tender perennials are rare; some palms will grow, but need winter protection. Although Phormiums (New Zealand flax) grow in displays in Newbiggin, salt-laden winds may afford them some protection. The most exposed part of the town is to the east. High trees in Hirst Park give considerable shelter. The west part is much more sheltered, especially the wooded valley of the River Wansbeck. Climate in this area has mild differences between highs and lows, and there is adequate rainfall year-round. The Köppen Climate Classification subtype for this climate is "Cfb" (Marine West Coast Climate/Oceanic climate).

Climate data for Ashington, UK
Month	Jan	Feb	Mar	Apr	May	Jun	Jul	Aug	Sep	Oct	Nov	Dec	Year
Mean daily maximum °C (°F)	6 (43)	7 (44)	8 (47)	10 (50)	12 (54)	16 (60)	18 (64)	18 (64)	16 (61)	13 (55)	9 (48)	7 (44)	12 (53)
Mean daily minimum °C (°F)	3 (37)	3 (37)	3 (38)	5 (41)	7 (45)	10 (50)	12 (54)	12 (54)	11 (52)	8 (46)	5 (41)	3 (38)	7 (44)
Average precipitation mm (inches)	61 (2.4)	43 (1.7)	41 (1.6)	43 (1.7)	53 (2.1)	46 (1.8)	79 (3.1)	79 (3.1)	58 (2.3)	64 (2.5)	66 (2.6)	58 (2.3)	690 (27.2)
Source: Weatherbase

== Transport ==
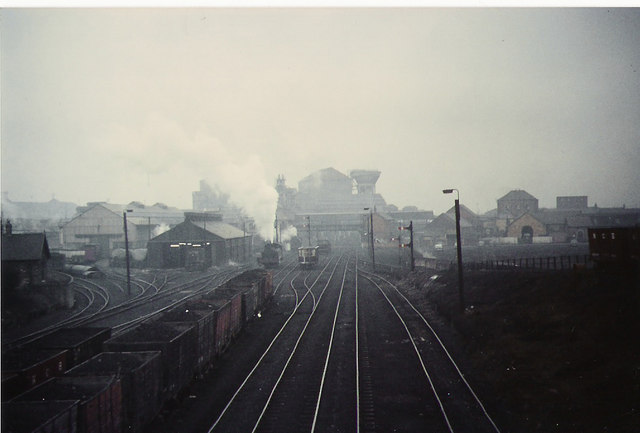
the railways at Ashington

=== Rail ===
The town is served by the Northumberland Line, which provides passenger railway services from Ashington to Seaton Delaval and Newcastle. Construction is still taking place on stations in Bedlington, Blyth and Northumberland Park which were delayed from their original planned opening date in 2024. Passenger services started operation as of 15 December 2024 to Seaton Delaval and Newcastle, after numerous delays.

=== Bus ===
At the east end of the main shopping street is the bus station, with local Arriva North East buses linking to the rest of Northumberland and to Newcastle. Arriva provides frequent services to Pegswood, Morpeth, Blyth, Bedlington and Newcastle.

=== Road ===
Ashington is well served by roads. The A189 (colloquially known as the Spine Road) to the east of Ashington runs south via Blyth and North Tyneside to Newcastle, and via the A19 Tyne Tunnel to South Tyneside and the A1(M). The A1068 runs north along the coast to Alnwick. The A196 and A197 runs west towards Morpeth and the A1 which goes north to Scotland and Edinburgh or south to the A1(M) near Newcastle on towards Durham and Yorkshire and the South.

=== Air and Sea ===
The nearest airport is Newcastle Airport, which provides scheduled domestic flights, flights covering many major cities in Europe, long haul international flights and holiday charter flights. There is a port in nearby North Shields with daily passenger services to IJmuiden in the Netherlands.

== Amenities ==
=== Museums and libraries ===
A reasonable-sized public library is based in the Leisure Centre on Lintonville Terrace at the northern fringes of the town. The local museum is at Woodhorn pit. It is mainly a museum of the town's mining history with pictures and models. There are also various arts exhibits in the museum, including a permanent exhibition of the Pitmen Painters' paintings, and information on local history.

=== Parks walks and green spaces ===
Riverside Park provides a riverside setting in which to relax or take walks. The park runs along the Wansbeck River. There are public footpaths and bridleways from here towards the quaint village of Bothal with its photogenic castle above the river.

The People's Park near the leisure centre off Institute Road is a large green field suitable for recreation. Hirst Park is located off Hawthorn Road; locally, it has traditionally been known as The Flower Park, due to its summer floral displays. It has bowling greens, basketball and tennis courts, play areas and is sheltered by tall trees. To the north of the park is a large sports field, where historically, the town hosted fun fairs.

At Woodhorn is the Queen Elizabeth II Park. This is surrounded by pine wood, including the Ashington Community Woods, connecting the park to Ashington, and has a large lake with a narrow-gauge railway connecting the main car park to the Woodhorn Museum. Walks from here head out towards Linton and eastwards towards the seaside town of Newbiggin following the old railway line.

Ashington enjoys a good location within Northumberland allowing good access to the countryside. The town is situated near the coast, enabling short journey times to beaches such as Druridge Bay and Cresswell. Northumberland National Park is close by.

=== Sport ===
Ashington has several sports facilities and numerous sports clubs. A new leisure centre was erected on the former Asda site in the town centre; it opened in December 2015.

Hirst Park provides two good quality bowling greens as well as tennis and basketball courts. Ashington A.F.C. now play at Woodhorn Lane having moved from Portland Park to make way for the new Asda superstore in 2008. Rugby is played at a ground on the north west edge of the town and cricket is played off Kenilworth Road, clise to the town centre.

In recent years, a new community facility has been created from the former Miners Welfare centre on Alexandra Road. The Hirst Welfare Centre is a multi-use community facility with training facilities, office space, a cafe, community hall, gym and dance studio. The centre also has an external all-weather, floodlight synthetic football pitch with additional grass pitches.

== Education ==
The previous system of first school, middle school and high school used in Ashington was phased out in September 2015, with Bothal Middle School and Hirst Park Middle School closing. First schools became primary schools while Ashington High School (now Ashington Academy) became a full secondary school. Schools were first built by the Ashington coal company, but many have since been replaced.

Northumberland College (formerly, Ashington Technical College) is the main further education provider in the town, and offers A levels, NVQs, vocational courses and various evening classes.

== Healthcare ==
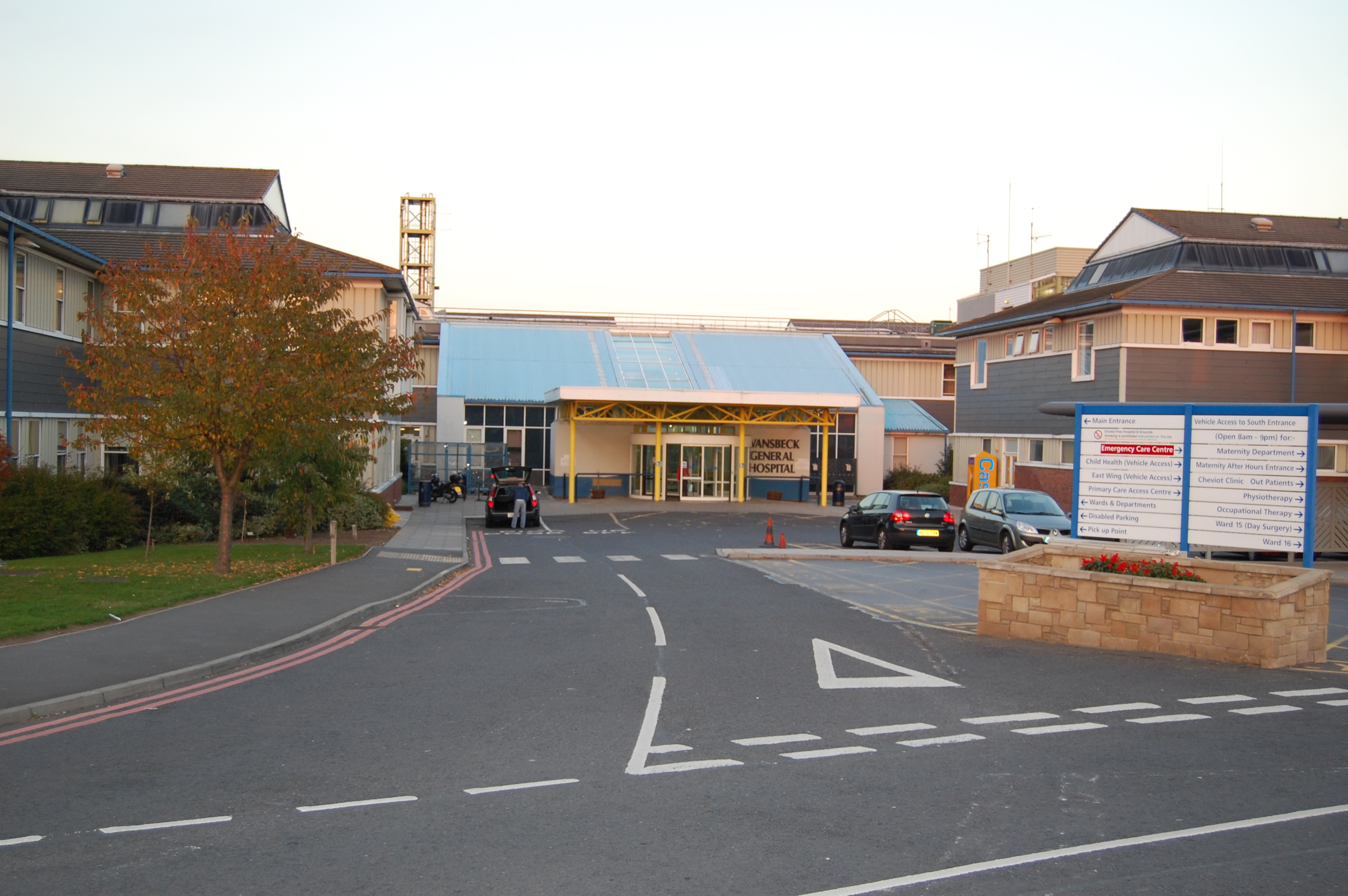
Wansbeck General Hospital.

There are many General Practitioner (GP) surgeries in Ashington. The main Wansbeck General Hospital in Ashington is located at the north east of the town near Woodhorn. Major treatments are provided at hospitals in Newcastle. A&E services are provided at the Northumbria Specialist Emergency Care Hospital in nearby Cramlington.

== Local media ==
The local newspapers are: the Evening Chronicle, The Journal. These papers cover Tyneside and south east Northumberland. The News Post Leader covers mostly Wansbeck.

Local radio stations are BBC Radio Newcastle on 95.4 FM, Capital North East on 105.3 FM, Heart North East on 101.8 FM, Smooth North East on 97.5 FM, Hits Radio North East on 97.1 FM, and Koast Radio, a community based station which broadcast from the town on 106.6 FM.

Local news and television programmes are provided by BBC North East and Cumbria and ITV Tyne Tees. Television signals are received from either the Pontop Pike or Chatton TV transmitters.

== Politics ==
As of 2024, the local Member of Parliament is Ian Lavery of the Labour Party, with Ashington forming part of the Blyth and Ashington constituency, which was created following a boundary review and first contested in the 2024 general election. The previous Wansbeck constituency was also held by Lavery from 2010 to 2024.

Ashington elects six County Councillors (One with part of West Newbiggin) to Northumberland County Council as of 2014, these seats are held by Labour Party candidates. Ashington Town Council is made up of six wards each electing three councillors, as of 2014 seventeen of these are held by the Labour Party.

== Industry and employment ==
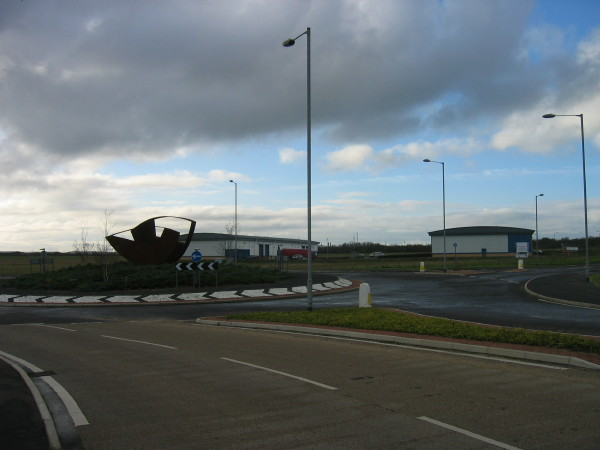
Light industry has replaced mining as one of the town's principal sectors of employment.

Until 1988 the majority of the town's male population were employed in the mining industry. The closure of the pits led to large scale unemployment. However limited coal mining was carried out until recently at Ellington Colliery and opencast coal extraction was carried out at Butterwell Opencast.

The former site of Ashington Colliery became part of a regeneration project and saw the development of Wansbeck Business Park. This park now houses a number of companies with local, national and international profiles. These include Polar Krush NICC Ltd, Thermacore Ltd and Sugarfayre Ltd. The park includes a variety of wildlife with a large pond at its centre.

Ashington's close proximity to Newcastle upon Tyne makes it an ideal commuter town for people working in the city.

== Arts and culture ==
In 1934, some of the Ashington miners enrolled in painting classes as an alternative pastime and then began to produce paintings to sell at local markets to supplement their poor wages. They achieved unexpected success and approval from the art community and were given prestigious gallery exhibitions during the 1930s and 1940s under the name "The Pitmen Painters", although the group had called themselves the "Ashington Group". In the 1970s the group's work was "rediscovered" and popularised as "workers' art" and given international exhibitions. On 26 October 2006, a new £16m museum housing the work was opened in Ashington by The Princess Royal.

The book The Pitmen Painters by William Feaver, recording the development of the Ashington Group, 1934 to 1984, has been made into a stage play by Lee Hall, well known for Billy Elliot. The play premiered at the Live Theatre, Newcastle upon Tyne, in 2007 and subsequently was produced at the Royal National Theatre, London in 2008 and 2009. A German translation by Michael Raab premiered at the Volkstheater in Vienna, Austria, in April 2009. In 2011 Oscar/BAFTA award-winning Film Director Jon Blair made a film for ITV1's Perspectives Arts series, entitled Robson Green and The Pitmen Painters giving an insight into the lives and work of the Ashington Group including rare film footage of the group in their Hut including interviews with Oliver Kilbourn and Harry Wilson.

Ashington has appeared in various films and TV programmes, such as Spender starring Jimmy Nail, Our Friends in the North in 1996, The Fast Show on BBC2 and the Alcan chimneys were seen in the movie, Billy Elliot.

The mining workers of Ashington gave a 'Hooky mat' to their friends in Ashington, West Sussex, where it is now displayed in the village hall.

== Notable residents ==
- Ian Lavery, President of the National Union of Mineworkers
- William Timlin, author and architect

=== Sporting personalities ===
Ashington has produced a number of professional footballers, notably Jack Milburn, Jackie Milburn, Jimmy Adamson, Jack Charlton, Bobby Charlton, Cecil Irwin, Colin Ayre, David Thompson, Chris Adamson, Martin Taylor, Peter Ramage, Brian Carolin and Mark Cullen. Premier League referee Michael Oliver, the youngest in the league's history, was born in the town. Property developer Sir John Hall, former chairman and Life President of Newcastle United Football Club, was born in North Seaton village on the outskirts of the town in 1933. Mike Norris, current head coach of Portland Thorns FC, was born in Ashington.

Cricketing brothers Steve Harmison and Ben Harmison are from the town, as are fellow cricketers Mark Wood and Simon Smith. The first-class cricketer Jack Clark was born in Ashington.

Premier League Motorcycle speedway rider Leon Flint was born in Ashington.

Golfer Kenneth Ferrie, who has played on the PGA Tour, is from Ashington.

== See also ==
- List of towns in England
