= Alan Craft =

British paediatric oncologist

Sir Alan Craft FRCP FRCPCH FFPH FMedSci FRCPI FRCPE FRCR FRCA
- Born: 6 July 1946; Newcastle upon Tyne, England
- Education: Newcastle University Medical School
- Scientific career
- Fields: Pediatrics, oncology
- Workplaces: Royal Victoria Infirmary, North Tyneside General Hospital

Sir Alan William Craft (born 6 July 1946 in Newcastle upon Tyne) is a British paediatric oncologist and Emeritus Professor of Child Health at Newcastle University. Craft was most notable for work as one of nine founders of the Children's Cancer Study Group, focusing his research on paediatric oncology, especially the epidemiology of bone tumours that further led to an oncology research unit which has been involved in aetiological studies and in particular the role of irradiation in the development of childhood cancer.

== Life ==
Craft did his clinical training at the Newcastle University Medical School from 1964, qualifying in 1969 with a Bachelor of Medicine, Bachelor of Surgery. He chose pediatrics as his specialism, becoming a pre-registration house officer at the Royal Victoria Infirmary. It was by accident that Craft ended up being a key figure in pediatric oncology. When a colleague at the Royal Victoria Infirmary went on maternity leave in the 1970s, Craft stood in to look after the children with leukemia, and it sparked an interest in children's diseases and started his road to specialising in paediatric oncology, a field that at the time was relatively new and beginning to develop.

He then undertook an MRC Fellowship, working for a year at the Royal Marsden Hospital in London, before returning to Newcastle.

Craft retired in 2010, becoming Emeritus Professor of Child Health at Newcastle University.

Craft's wife, Anne (Lady Craft), was a pediatric nurse.

== Career ==
Craft took further training in adult medicine, undertaking a series of paediatric posts before becoming a consultant in 1978. His initial consultancy position was at North Tyneside General Hospital, where he worked along with a part-time position at Royal Victoria Infirmary developing what was considered the new speciality of paediatric oncology. He would grow the unit over the next 25 years into an oncology service for the north of England.

In 1985, Craft returned to work full-time at the Royal Victoria Infirmary in Newcastle, as a Senior House Officer. Training in rheumatology led Craft to an interest in joint diseases in children and from that he established a paediatric rheumatology service.

In 1993, he was appointed to the Sir James Spence Chair of Child Health and became responsible for the teaching of undergraduate medical students.

Craft was appointed by the Secretary of State, Charles Clarke to the new Post Graduate Medical Education and Training Board in January 2006 as the UK's new regulator of postgraduate medical education. Between 2006-08, Craft, along with Sue Killen, chief executive of St John Ambulance, undertook a major review of palliative care services for children in England for the Secretary of State, eventually producing a report titled Palliative Care for Children and Young People in England.

Craft continued to work in his speciality until his retirement from clinical practice in November 2009.

== Societies ==
Craft has a large number of professional memberships, both local and international. From 2004 to 2007, he was Chairman of the Academy of Medical Royal Colleges. In the 1990s he had various roles in the British Paediatric Association before becoming Vice President between 1998 and 2003 and then President of the Royal College of Paediatrics and Child Health to 2006.

Craft was Chairman of the United Kingdom Children's Cancer Study Group between 1992 and 1994, and Chairman of the Medical Research Council (MRC) Bone Sarcoma Committee between 1989 and 1996. He was a member of the MRC Cancer Therapy committee between 1989 and 1996, and of the Management Board of the UK Case Control Study of Childhood Cancer from 1992 onwards, and Honorary President of Together for Short Lives.

Internationally, Craft was president from 1999 to 2005 of the International Society of Paediatric Oncology (SIOP).

== Charities ==
Craft established the North of England Children's Cancer Research Fund in 1978.

== Scouts ==
Craft was a member of the scouts movement when he was young, and in 2009 he was appointed as Chairman of the UK Scout Association, the largest and most successful youth organisation in the UK. Craft is currently (2018) the County Chairman of the Northumberland Scouts.

== Hospital reorganization ==
On 31 July 2009, in a letter to the Newcastle upon Tyne newspaper The Journal, Craft expressed concerns about the local authorities' plan to restructure children's services in the region by moving them from North Tyneside General Hospital and Wansbeck General Hospital to a new hospital near Annitsford. Craft stated in the letter that it would be difficult to staff the new hospital at Annitsford, due to a shortage of doctors and nurses, and that "develop[ing] in-patient emergency services for children in Cramlington [would] go against all current guidance and defies common sense". Craft stated that with the new hospital, there was an opportunity to provide world class services for "all children north of the Tyne, and perhaps further south", but the proposals meant that children "will be condemned to second rate services for the foreseeable future".

== Bibliography ==
Craft has over written over 300 articles and papers. These are the most cited articles:

- Pearce, Mark S; Salotti, Jane A; Little, Mark P; McHugh, Kieran; Lee, Choonsik; Kim, Kwang Pyo; Howe, Nicola L; Ronckers, Cecile M; Rajaraman, Preetha; Craft, Alan W; Parker, Louise; Berrington de González, Amy (August 2012). "Radiation exposure from CT scans in childhood and subsequent risk of leukaemia and brain tumours: a retrospective cohort study". The Lancet. 380 (9840): 499–505. doi:10.1016/S0140-6736(12)60815-0. PMC 3418594. PMID 22681860.
- Openshaw, Stan; Charlton, Martin; Wymer, Colin; Craft, Alan (January 1987). "A Mark 1 Geographical Analysis Machine for the automated analysis of point data sets". International Journal of Geographical Information Systems. 1 (4): 335–358. doi:10.1080/02693798708927821.
- Birch, JM; Hartley, AL; Tricker, KJ; Prosser, J; Condie, A; Kelsey, AM; Harris, M; Jones, PH; Binchy, A; Crowther, D (1 March 1994). "Prevalence and diversity of constitutional mutations in the p53 gene among 21 Li-Fraumeni families". Cancer Research. 54 (5): 1298–304. PMID 8118819.
- Wright, C. M; Parker, L.; Lamont, D.; Craft, A. W (1 December 2001). "Implications of childhood obesity for adult health: findings from thousand families cohort study". BMJ. 323 (7324): 1280–1284. doi:10.1136/bmj.323.7324.1280. PMC 60301. PMID 11731390.
- Souhami, Robert L; Craft, Alan W; Van der Eijken, Jan W; Nooij, Marianne; Spooner, David; Bramwell, Vivien HC; Wierzbicki, Rafal; Malcolm, Archibald J; Kirkpatrick, Anne; Uscinska, Barbara M; Van Glabbeke, Martine; Machin, David (September 1997). "Randomised trial of two regimens of chemotherapy in operable osteosarcoma: a study of the European Osteosarcoma Intergroup". The Lancet. 350 (9082): 911–917. doi:10.1016/S0140-6736(97)02307-6. PMID 9314869. S2CID 206010300.
- Ladenstein, Ruth; Pötschger, Ulrike; Le Deley, Marie Cécile; Whelan, Jeremy; Paulussen, Michael; Oberlin, Odile; van den Berg, Henk; Dirksen, Uta; Hjorth, Lars; Michon, Jean; Lewis, Ian; Craft, Alan; Jürgens, Heribert (10 July 2010). "Primary Disseminated Multifocal Ewing Sarcoma: Results of the Euro-EWING 99 Trial". Journal of Clinical Oncology. 28 (20): 3284–3291. doi:10.1200/JCO.2009.22.9864. PMID 20547982.
- Lewis, Ian J.; Nooij, Marianne A.; Whelan, Jeremy; Sydes, Matthew R.; Grimer, Robert; Hogendoorn, Pancras C. W.; Memon, Muhammad A.; Weeden, Simon; Uscinska, Barbara M.; van Glabbeke, Martine; Kirkpatrick, Anne; Hauben, Esther I.; Craft, Alan W.; Taminiau, Antonie H. M. (17 January 2007). "Improvement in Histologic Response But Not Survival in Osteosarcoma Patients Treated With Intensified Chemotherapy: A Randomized Phase III Trial of the European Osteosarcoma Intergroup". Journal of the National Cancer Institute. 99 (2): 112–128. doi:10.1093/jnci/djk015. PMID 17227995.
- Openshaw, S; Charlton, M; Craft, A.W; Birch, J.M (February 1988). "Investigation of Leukaemia Clusters by Use of a Geographical Analysis Machine". The Lancet. 331 (8580): 272–273. doi:10.1016/S0140-6736(88)90352-2. PMID 2893085. S2CID 24476784.
- Widemann, Brigitte C.; Balis, Frank M.; Kempf-Bielack, Beate; Bielack, Stefan; Pratt, Charles B.; Ferrari, Stefano; Bacci, Gaetano; Craft, Alan W.; Adamson, Peter C. (15 May 2004). "High-dose methotrexate-induced nephrotoxicity in patients with osteosarcoma". Cancer. 100 (10): 2222–2232. doi:10.1002/cncr.20255. PMID 15139068. S2CID 20750213.
- Wiggs, Janey; Nordenskjöld, Magnus; Yandell, David; Rapaport, Joyce; Grondin, Valerie; Janson, Marie; Werelius, Barbro; Petersen, Robert; Craft, Alan; Riedel, Klaus; Liberfarb, Ruth; Walton, David; Wilson, William; Dryja, Thaddeus P. (21 January 1988). "Prediction of the Risk of Hereditary Retinoblastoma, Using DNA Polymorphisms within the Retinoblastoma Gene". New England Journal of Medicine. 318 (3): 151–157. doi:10.1056/NEJM198801213180305. PMID 2892131.

== Awards and honours ==
Craft was knighted with a Knight Bachelor for his services to medicine in 2005. He was elected a Fellow of the Academy of Medical Sciences in 2003 and was awarded the James Spence Medal in 2008.
