= Northumbria Specialist Emergency Care Hospital =

- Northumbria Healthcare NHS Foundation Trust
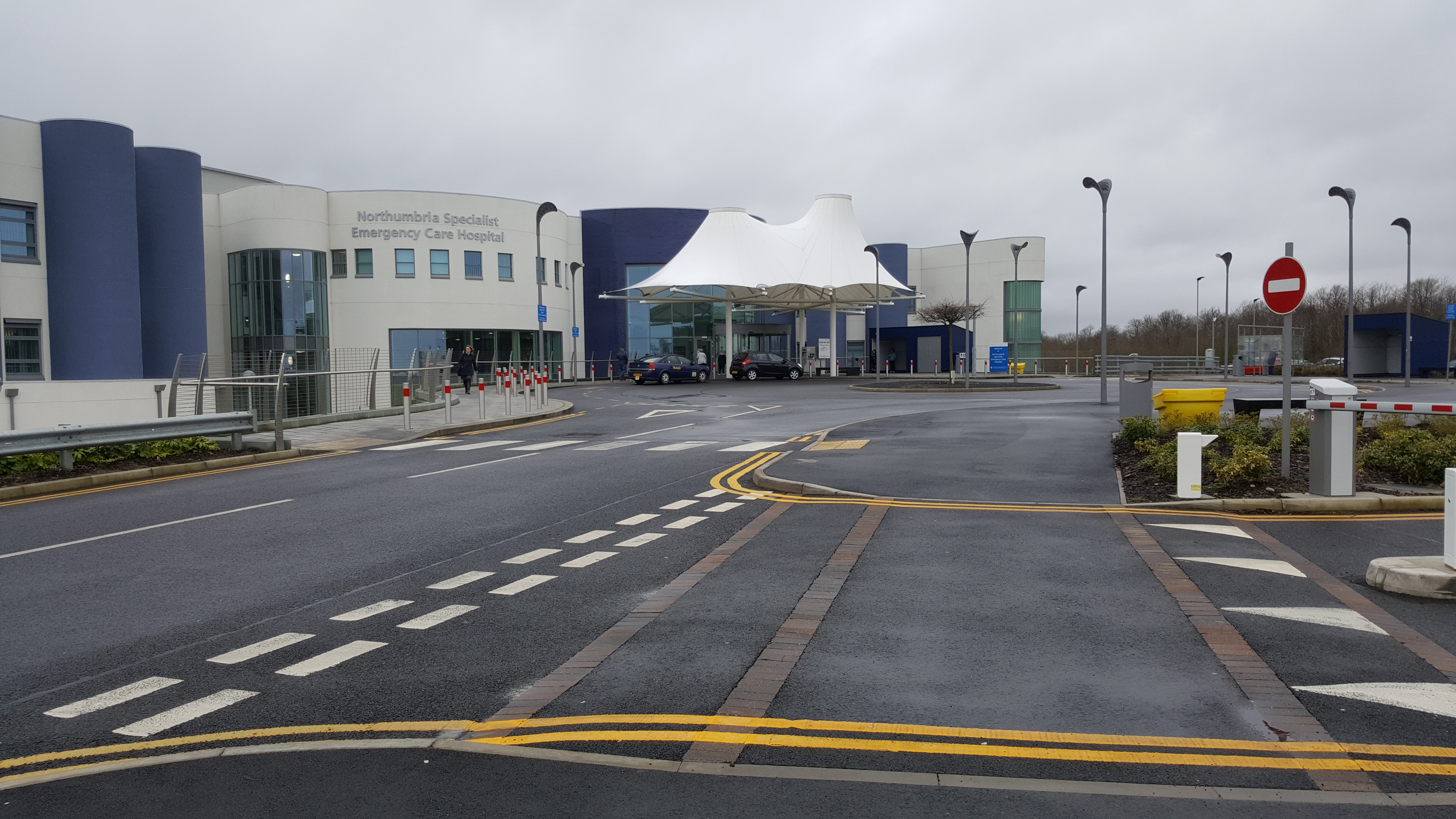
- Northumbria Specialist Emergency Care Hospital

- Shown in Northumberland

Geography
- Location: Cramlington, Northumberland, England, United Kingdom
- Coordinates: 55°4′27″N 1°34′9″W

Organisation
- Care system: Public NHS
- Type: Specialist Accident & Emergency
- Affiliated university: Newcastle University Medical School

Services
- Emergency department: Yes Accident & Emergency

History
- Founded: June 2015; 11 years ago

Links
- Website: Northumbria Healthcare
- Lists: Hospitals in England

The Northumbria Specialist Emergency Care Hospital known locally as Cramlington Hospital is a hospital specialising in emergency care for sick and injured patients, opened in 2015 in Cramlington, Northumberland, England by the Northumbria Healthcare NHS Foundation Trust.

== Hospital ==
The Northumbria Specialist Emergency Care Hospital is the first NHS hospital purpose-designed to care for emergency cases. It brings together specialists across multiple emergency medicine disciplines, has 24-hour cover from emergency consultants and is fully staffed on a 7-day per week basis.

The hospital, which opened on 16 June 2015, cost £75 million to build, with a further £5 million spent on road improvements in the vicinity. An additional £15 million was spent on state-of-the-art diagnostic tools including static and portable digital x-ray systems, two CT scanners and an MRI scanner. The hospital is arranged with specialist wards for surgery, trauma, cardiology, respiratory, stroke and gastrointestinal cases, and has an acute medical unit and a birthing centre.

The intention of Northumbria NHS Foundation Trust is to consolidate the practise of emergency medicine at a single centre of excellence to improve patient outcomes. The opening of the hospital has led to accident and emergency facilities being downgraded in other Northumbria NHS hospitals including the Wansbeck, Hexham, and North Tyneside. The trade-off between better facilities and consultant cover, versus longer drive-times to reach the hospital, has been the subject of some controversy and criticism.

It was announced in November 2018 that a new building would be constructed off site by the McAvoy Group, linked to the hospital, to house a purpose-designed 2,000 square metre ambulatory care unit with the capacity to treat up to 150 patients a day without the need for hospital admission.

In February 2021 the trust launched a court case against Lendlease after significant structural defects were identified in the building. This has triggered counterclaims by Lendlease against several of its sub-contractors, including Balfour Beatty, over which firm is liable for the defects. The trust claims it will cost around £65 million to fully rectify them and they will need temporary facilities into which patients can be decanted while the remedial works are carried out. Following a pre-trial hearing in May 2022, the High Court set a new trial start date of 24 October 2022.
