= Stonelaw Middle School =

Coordinates: 55°04′33″N 1°35′26″W

Cramlington Stonelaw County Middle School

Location
- Highburn; Cramlington, Northumberland; England

Information
- Type: Middle School
- Motto: "Educating to ensure a firm foundation"
- Closed: 2008
- Local authority: Northumberland
- Head teacher: Andrew Youngs
- Gender: Co-educational
- Age: 10 to 13
- Houses: Arcot, Blagdon, Delaval, and Plessey
- Colours: Black, White (Houses: Blue, Green, Yellow and Red)
- Website: http://www.stonelaw.northumberland.sch.uk/

Stonelaw County Middle School was a middle school in Cramlington, Northumberland, England, normally referred to as Stonelaw.

Operating under the three-tier system in Northumberland, the school had an intake of pupils aged 10–13. The school was closed when Cramlington Learning Village opened in 2008.

The school had extended classrooms in the form of a Science Laboratory, an Art Room and a Music and Drama Room, all taught by teachers specialising in that subject. The school also had the use of the Sporting Club fields for PE and Games.

The school itself was one block instead of multiple blocks of buildings.

The final headmaster before closure was Mr Andrew Youngs and the acting deputy was Mr Doug Moore.
