= Berwick Infirmary =

- Northumbria Healthcare NHS Foundation Trust
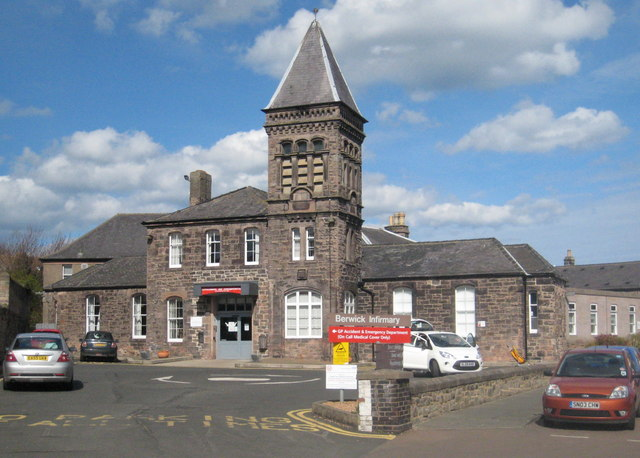
- Berwick Infirmary

- Shown in Northumberland

Geography
- Location: Berwick-upon-Tweed, Northumberland, England, United Kingdom
- Coordinates: 55.7731°N 2.0051°W

Organisation
- Care system: Public NHS
- Type: Community Hospital

Services
- Emergency department: No Accident & Emergency

History
- Founded: 1814

Links
- Website: www.northumbria.nhs.uk
- Lists: Hospitals in England

Berwick Infirmary is a community hospital in Berwick-upon-Tweed, Northumberland, England. It is managed by Northumbria Healthcare NHS Foundation Trust.

== History ==
The hospital was first established in a house off Church Street in 1814. It moved to Quay Walls (into the building now known as the Customs House) in 1826.

A purpose-built hospital, designed by John Starforth, opened in Low Greens in 1874. New wards were added in 1911 and 1926. The hospital joined the National Health Service in 1948 and it was extended again in the 1960s and 1970s. In December 2020 it was agreed to build a new Berwick Community Hospital on the site. This will include an endoscopy suite.
