= Haltwhistle War Memorial Hospital =

- Northumbria Healthcare NHS Foundation Trust
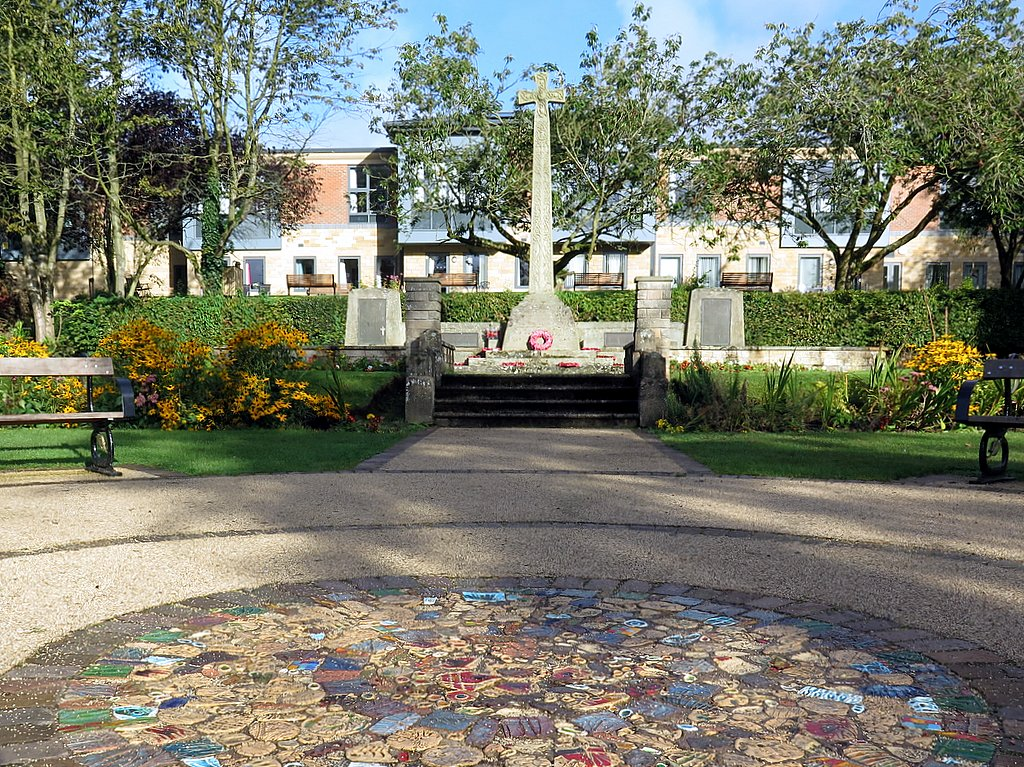
- Haltwhistle War Memorial Hospital (behind the war memorial)

- Shown in Northumberland

Geography
- Location: Haltwhistle, Northumberland, England, United Kingdom
- Coordinates: 54.9700°N 2.4631°W

Organisation
- Care system: Public NHS
- Type: Community Hospital

Services
- Emergency department: No Accident & Emergency

History
- Founded: 1922

Links
- Website: www.northumbria.nhs.uk
- Lists: Hospitals in England

Haltwhistle War Memorial Hospital is a health facility at Greencroft Park, Haltwhistle, Northumberland, England. It is managed by Northumbria Healthcare NHS Foundation Trust. The war memorial itself, which stands in front of the hospital, is a Grade II listed structure.

== History ==
The original facility was built as a private home known as Greencroft House in the 18th century. It was remodeled in the early 19th century and then converted into a hospital, as a lasting memorial to soldiers who died in the First World War, in August 1922. A maternity wing was added in 1939 and it joined the National Health Service in 1948. It was completely rebuilt to modern standards at a cost of £5.5 million in 2014.
