= Alnwick Community Hospital =

- Northumbria Healthcare NHS Foundation Trust
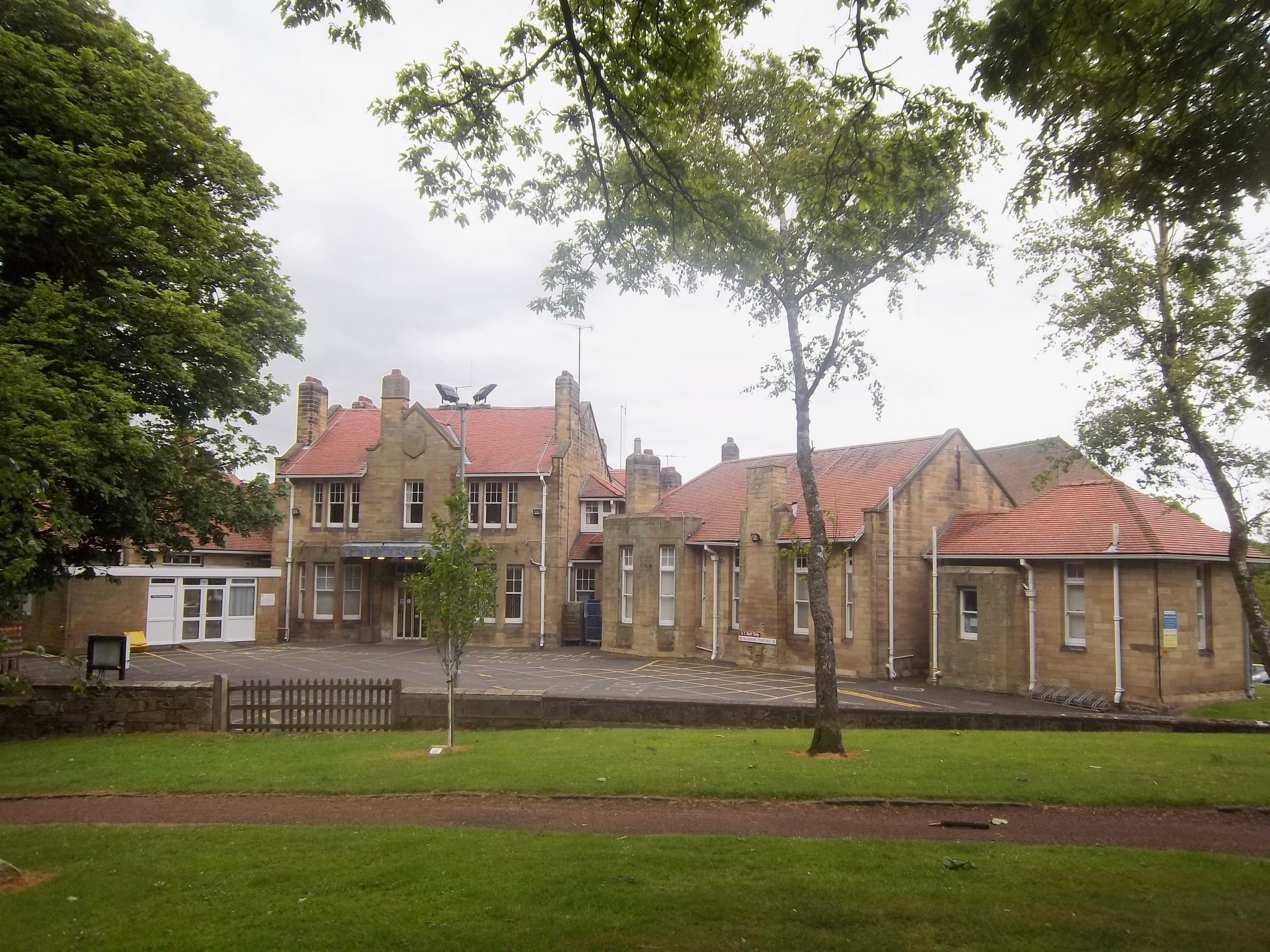
- Alnwick Community Hospital

- Shown in Northumberland

Geography
- Location: Alnwick, Northumberland, England, United Kingdom
- Coordinates: 55.4110°N 1.6976°W

Organisation
- Care system: Public NHS
- Type: Community Hospital

Services
- Emergency department: No Accident & Emergency

History
- Founded: 1815

Links
- Website: www.northumbria.nhs.uk
- Lists: Hospitals in England

Alnwick Community Hospital is a community hospital in Alnwick, Northumberland, England. It is managed by Northumbria Healthcare NHS Foundation Trust.

== History ==
An infirmary at Alnwick was instigated at a public meeting on 9 June 1815 as the Alnwick Dispensary "to administer advice and medicine to the poor, to promote vaccine inoculation and to afford aid in cases requiring the greater applications of surgery." George Tate credits William Burrell of Broom Park (Note: William Burrell (1773-1847) was a landowner and in 1811, High Sheriff of Northumberland. Broom Park was a stately home and estate 4.7 miles (7.6 km) west of Alnwick - 55.408827°N 1.827563°W) and John Lambert of Alnwick (Note: John Lambert was a local solicitor.) as principal founders; Lambert acted as secretary and treasurer until his decease in 1849.

The infirmary was funded by a mix of donations and subscriptions; £2081 was received in the first year, much of which was invested in interest-bearing funds. Governors of the infirmary, who subscribed yearly one guinea or donated ten guineas, had the privilege of recommending patients for care. Subscriptions and donations continued to be in excess of the expenditure up to 1839, when £4900 was invested in 3 per cent consols. The institution having then the reputation of being a rich body, donations were seldom made and the subscriptions were lessened, so that debt accumulated and it became necessary to sell stock funds and to seek additional public aid to clear off the incumbrance. The financial position was stabilised by the 1860s when income and expenditure were typically about £420 per annum. William Davison acted as apothecary for the infirmary; a medical school Davison set up in his pharmacy premises was noted throughout the North of England.

The Dispensary was sited first in a house on Fenkle Street, and moved to a purpose-built building on Dispensary Street in 1819. (Note: Alnwick Infirmary 1819 building - 55.414187°N 1.710361°W) It changed its name to the Alnwick Infirmary in 1849.

New hospital premises were built and opened in 1908 close to the Tenantry Column. Alnwick infirmary joined the National Health Service in 1948.

== Other Alnwick hospitals ==
A hospital formed part of the Alnwick Union Workhouse, built in 1841 on Wagonway road. (Note: Alnwick Union Workhouse hospital - 55.409077°N 1.701606°W) A fever hospital was established between 1886 and 1888 on a greenfield site about 0.5 miles (0.80 km) south of the workhouse, and was used until 1952. (Note: Alnwick fever hospital - 55.405317°N 1.700313°W)
