= Cramlington =

Town in Northumberland, England

Coordinates: 55.082°N 1.585°W

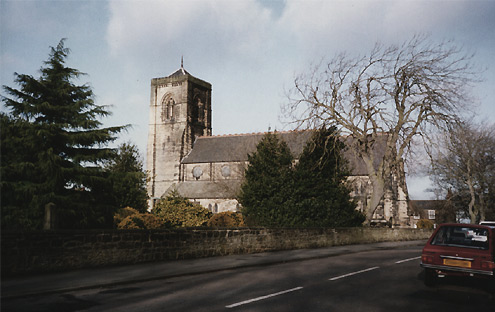
- The parish church of St. Nicholas

- Location within Northumberland
- Population: 28,845
- OS grid reference: NZ270760
- Civil parish: Cramlington
- Unitary authority: Northumberland
- Ceremonial county: Northumberland
- Region: North East
- Country: England
- Sovereign state: United Kingdom
- Post town: CRAMLINGTON
- Postcode district: NE23
- Dialling code: 01670
- Police: Northumbria
- Fire: Northumberland
- Ambulance: North East
- UK Parliament: Cramlington and Killingworth

Cramlington is a town and civil parish in Northumberland. It is 6 miles (9.7 kilometres) north of Newcastle upon Tyne. The name suggests a probable founding by the Danes or Anglo-Saxons.

The population of Cramlington (built-up area) was 28845 at the 2021 census. It sits on the border between Northumberland and North Tyneside with the traffic interchange at Moor Farm, Annitsford, linking the two areas.

The area of East Cramlington lies east of the A189, on the B1326 road that connects the town to Seaton Delaval.

== History ==
The first record of the Manor of Cramlington is from a mention in 1135 when the land was granted to Nicholas de Grenville. A register of early chaplains begins with John the Clerk of Cramlington (c. 1163–1180). The register continues to the present day.

From the 12th century onwards, Cramlington’s history was predominantly rural, with several farms and the parish church of St Nicholas. Coal mining began to transform Cramlington during the early 19th century, with the opening of collieries in the surrounding area. The development of the industry brought rapid population growth, with the population of Cramlington chapelry increasing from 330 in 1821 to 931 in 1831 and 2,634 in 1841. By 1851, the population had reached 3,367; a contemporary account published in 1855 attributed this rapid increase to the opening of coal mines, including East Cramlington Colliery. By the mid-19th century, mining settlements had developed around several collieries, including Cramlington High Pit and West Cramlington Colliery. Coal mining remained central to the area’s development, best demonstrated by the construction of a new parish church of St Nicholas, completed in 1868 at a cost of £3,000. Historic England classifies its design as a "free 13th-century style," which leans into the Early English Gothic period while incorporating subtle French influences.

The development of railways in Cramlington began with the transport of coal from the local collieries. The Cramlington waggonway opened in 1822–1823, connecting the collieries with routes used to transport coal towards the Tyne. The opening of the Newcastle and Berwick Railway and Cramlington station in 1847 provided a link for passenger traffic, as well as supporting the area's growing industrial development. Cramlington was the site of two notable railway accidents. In 1855, the chassis of a first-class carriage failed, while in 1926 the Merry Hampton locomotive and five carriages of the Flying Scotsman express from Edinburgh to King's Cross were derailed by striking miners during the General Strike. The story of the derailment was recounted in the BBC Two programme Yesterday's Witness: The Cramlington Train Wreckers in 1970, and later turned into a successful play.

During World War I, the North East of England was protected by the No. 36 Home Defence Squadron. The squadron was formed at Cramlington on 1 February 1916 by Capt. R. O. Abercromby, with Cramlington subsequently becoming an important base for military planes and airships. The Airship Station was at Nelson Village. A reference to Cramlington airfield is made in W. E. Johns 1935 book The Black Peril from the extremely popular Biggles series.

The town remained small until 1964 when it was chosen by Northumberland County Council as the location for a new “township”.

=== New town development ===
The development of a new town development in Cramlington was first discussed in 1958. In June 1961, Northumberland County Council's Planning Committee approved the draft plans to establish what it hoped would be "Britain's first enterprise town." The development model for Cramlington was radically different to the government sponsored New Town. While the County Council supported the town’s infrastructure, the majority of development was planned by two house building companies, William Leech and J.T. Bell. It was predicted to take 20 years, cost £50m and eventually house 40,000 inhabitants across a four square mile site that also included an industrial zone. A one-way road system was proposed, with the waggon ways of the former pits being repurposed as pedestrians paths. The plan was finally approved by the Minister of Housing and Local Government in January 1963, by which time the estimated population had grown to 48,000 and the cost projected at £60m. It marked the first time a new town had been developed without the establishment of a government-backed development corporation. The planning officer predicted that it should look like a town in five years and be complete in 20 years. The first factory was to be completed by summer 1963. In October 1964, an advert inviting investment in the development recorded an area of 2,200 acres, 530 of which were for industry.

The housing and industrial sites developed rapidly, by 1968 this led to Cramlington becoming a "dormitory of urban Tyneside" due to the lack of investment in shops, schools, and community facilities. Local MP Eddie Milne sought government assistance to bring the amenities in line with these large scale developments.

2017 archaeological excavations carried out ahead of housing development at White Hall Farm uncovered the remains of an Iron Age settlement, including an enclosed settlement and several roundhouses. The discovery attracted considerable interest from local residents, but the archaeological remains were excavated and recorded to allow the housing development to proceed.

== Local government ==
Cramlington Local Government District was created in 1865. Later, the Local Government Act 1894 established the Cramlington Urban District. This was succeeded by the Seaton Valley Urban District in 1935. From 1 April 1974, Cramlington became a part of Blyth Valley. Responsibilities were transferred to Northumberland County Council from 1 April 2009 as a result of 2009 structural changes to local government in England.

On 5 September 2019, to mark the tenth anniversary of the establishment of Cramlington Town Council, it was agreed to create the position of town mayor. The position was awarded to Loraine De Simone, who had been a councillor in the Cramlington Village ward since 2017.

== Economy ==
=== Industry ===
There are several large industrial zones in Cramlington, most to the town's north-west near the sewage treatment plant, housing major pharmaceutical companies including Organon & Co.. Other growing chemical companies including Aesica Pharmaceuticals are also present. The Officers Club menswear firm (now owned by Blue Inc), previously had its headquarters and supply warehouse in Cramlington, in part of the old Wilkinson Blade factory while other companies such as GE Oil & Gas also occupy large sites. Start Football is also headquartered in the town.

Wilkinson Sword established the first factory in the town in 1964. American Air Filter Company later built premises. Brentford Nylons also opened a large site in the town in 1968.

Boots, the pharmaceuticals manufacturer, opened their plant in Cramlington in 1983.

=== Retail ===
The Manor Walks shopping centre was constructed in the centre of the town in the 1970s, and was subsequently expanded in the mid-1990s and in 2003/4. The centre now includes retailers such as Argos, Asda, Boots, Boyes, Next and Sainsbury's. In 2011, plans were put forward to revamp the main centre by building a new Vue multiplex cinema and improving the retail facilities. The South Mall extension opened in 2013.

=== Healthcare ===
Northumbria Healthcare NHS Foundation Trust opened the first hospital in England purpose-built for emergency care in the town in June 2015. The Northumbria Specialist Emergency Care Hospital cost £75 million. It has emergency care consultants on duty at all times, and a range of specialists available seven days a week. In February 2021, the NHS trust began court action against contractor Lendlease over structural defects identified in the building. A trial is due to start in October 2022.

== Landmarks ==
Plessey Woods Country Park lies just to the north of Cramlington, with the River Blyth flowing through the country park. Northumberlandia, a huge land sculpture in the shape of a reclining female figure is located on the outskirts of Cramlington. Within the town itself, Nelson Hill is a prominent landmark to the north of the town centre. Arcot Hall Grasslands and Ponds SSSI is situated to the south-east of the town.

== Transport ==
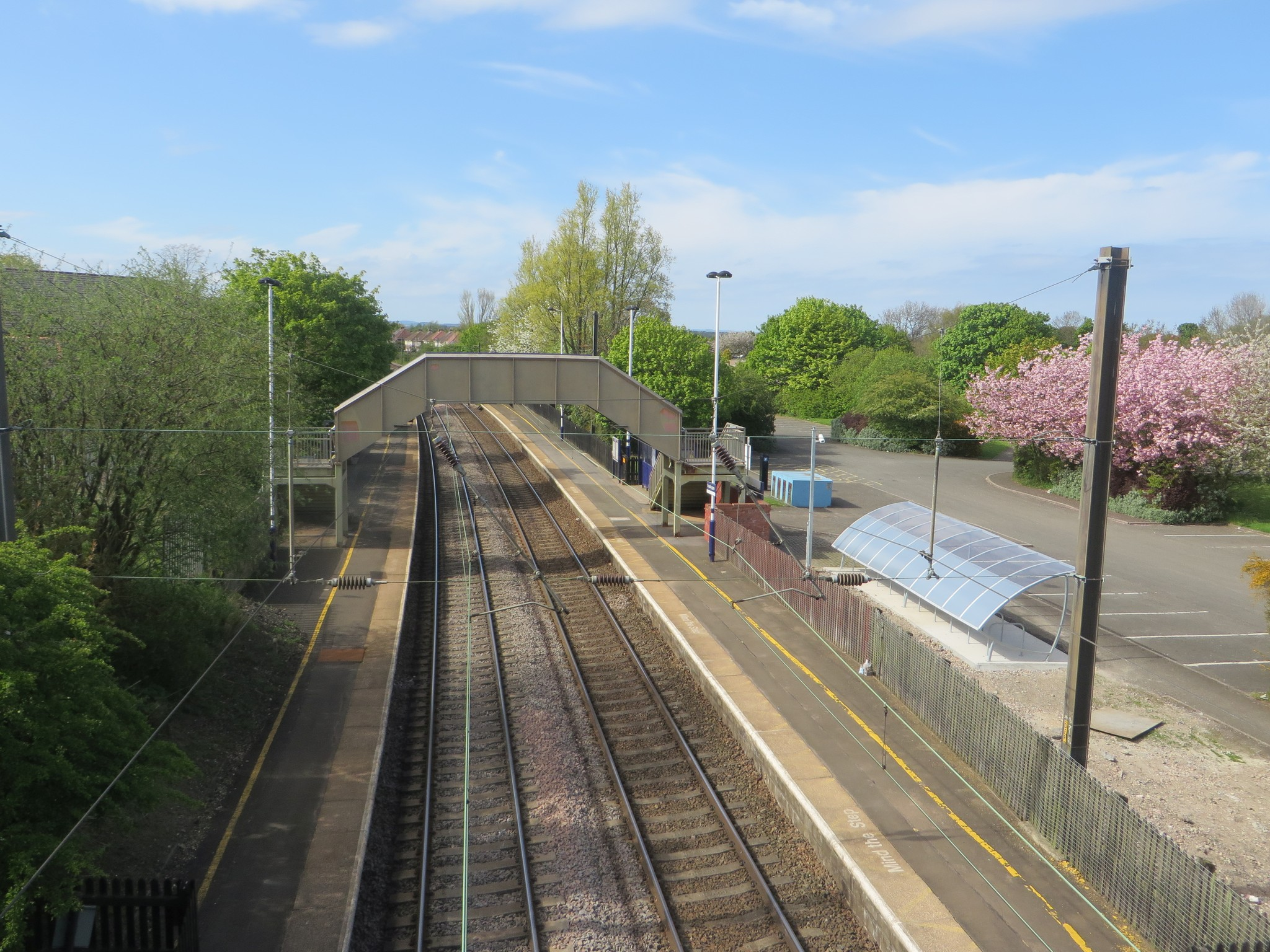
Cramlington railway station

The town is served by Cramlington railway station which is on the East Coast Main Line, with services to the MetroCentre, Morpeth and Newcastle upon Tyne provided by Northern.

It is also served by a number of bus operators including Arriva North East which provides express services to Newcastle upon Tyne, Morpeth and Blyth, as well as Go North East which runs services to and from North Shields.

The town is located approximately 12 mi (19 km) from Newcastle International Airport and 10 mi (16 km) from North Shields International Ferry Terminal.

Cramlington also has good road transport links, being situated between the A1, A19 and A189 roads.

In line with many of the UK's post-war New Towns, Cramlington has an extensive bicycle network. With a grid spacing of approximately 500 m (1,600 ft), segregated cycle routes are provided free of motorised traffic.

== Media ==
Local news and television programmes are provided by BBC North East and Cumbria and ITV Tyne Tees. Television signals are received from the Pontop Pike TV transmitter. Local radio stations are BBC Radio Newcastle, Heart North East, Capital North East, Smooth North East, Greatest Hits Radio North East, Hits Radio North East and Koast Radio, a community based radio station. The town is served by the local newspaper, Northumberland Gazette (formerly the News Post Leader).

== Education ==
Until September 2008, all schools in Northumberland operated under a three tier system. However, following a decision to convert the county to a two tier system, Cramlington was chosen as one of the first towns to complete this. Following the abolition of the three-tier school system in 2008, some former middle-school buildings in Cramlington were repurposed for primary education, including those used by Burnside Primary School and Cragside Primary School. There had been concern from local residents over traffic and parking arrangements at the new sites.

Other schools in Cramlington are listed as follows: Hareside Primary School, Hillcrest School, Shanklea Primary School, Burnside Primary School, Cragside Church of England Primary School, Northburn Primary School, Cramlington Village Primary School, Eastlea Primary School, Beaconhill Primary School and SS Peter and Paul's Catholic Primary Academy.

=== Cramlington Learning Village ===
In September 2008, Cramlington Community High School was renamed Cramlington Learning Village as it gained two new year groups in line with the move to a two tier system. The school has three sections: the Junior Learning Village (for Years 7 and 8), the Senior Learning Village (for Years 9 to 11) and the Advanced Learning Village (for Years 12 and 13). The school was rated outstanding in four successive Ofsted inspections, however was rated 'inadequate' in July 2015, sparking controversy between pupils, staff and parents. This however was raised to Good in successive reports from February 2017 and March 2022. The school's most recent inspection published July 2026, the school is recognised as performing to a 'strong standard' in five areas, and to 'expected standard' in two areas. This comes the Ofsted grading system stopped making 1-word overall judgements of schools.

In July 2022, the school was to be selected to be part of the Government's School Rebuilding Programme (SRP). Construction work is now underway, with a new 10,000m² 3-storey teaching complex set to open on site in October 2027 by contractors Bowmer + Kirkland, costing a total of £49.8 million. 9 of the existing 1960s buildings are to be demolished shortly after to create sports pitches.

== Religious sites ==
Cramlington has a number of Christian churches of various denominations:

Methodist

- Doxford Place Methodist Church
- Welcome Methodist Church (formerly Station Terrace Methodist Church)

Church of England

- St. Nicholas Parish Church
- St. Andrew's
- St. Peter's

Roman Catholic

- St. Paul's

Others

- Church of the Nazarene
- Frontline
- Open Episcopal Church

== Leisure ==
=== Leisure centre ===
Cramlington's main leisure centre, Concordia, is situated in the town centre adjacent to the shopping mall and was opened by Queen Elizabeth II in July 1977. It features a leisure pool, originally designed as an indoor tropical paradise, indoor football pitches, tennis, badminton and squash courts. It also includes a gymnasium, sauna, bowling green, bar and cafeteria. It was refurbished in 2008, particularly to improve disabled access. The pool was also refurbished in 2011. A major refurbishment began in 2016, with the addition of new facilities and the improvement of existing ones. Most recently, in 2019, a major pool refurbishment took place with changes including replacing the old pool lining and the swimming pool floor areas in the wet changing rooms and around the children's poolside water features.

=== Cycle paths ===
A large cycle path network, completely separate from the road network, was a key part of the new town design. A cycle route also connects the town to the nearest beach, in Blyth. In March 2007, Blyth Valley Borough Council announced that the cycle network was to be extended to allow access to the neighbouring town of Bedlington.

=== Public houses ===
The village square is home to four public houses, including the Grade II listed Blagdon Arms.

=== Sport ===
Cramlington Cricket club (CCC) are based at Cramlington learning Village. They have two men's senior teams playing in the Northumberland & Tyneside Cricket League as well as two midweek teams. They also have a senior women's team, in addition to an academy team and various junior teams. New additions to all teams are welcomed, the club can be reached by their multiple social media accounts.

Cramlington United was established in 2010 and they were awarded Community Club Status 12 months later. Their home ground is based at Northburn Sports & Community Centre. They are currently in Northern Football Alliance Premier Division.

Arcot Hall Golf Club is located to the south of the town.

Cramlington Rockets are a Rugby League team based in Cramlington. Initially, the club was formed in 2000 as Killingworth Rockets ARLFC. They are based on the fields of the Cramlington Learning Village. Their 1st team is currently in the North East division of the Rugby League Conference.

== Notable residents ==
- Charles Fenwick, trade unionist, born Cramlington
- Sam Heads, entomologist and palaeontologist, from Cramlington
- Ross Noble, comedian, from Cramlington
- Sting, musician, from 1974 to 1976, was a schoolteacher at St Paul's Roman Catholic First School

=== Football ===
- James Brown, Hartlepool United striker was born in Cramlington
- Ray Pointer (1936-2016), footballer: Burnley and England. Born Cramlington.
- Peter Ramage played youth football for Cramlington Juniors F.C.
- Alan Shearer, played youth football for Cramlington Juniors F.C.
- Martin Taylor, professional footballer currently with Sheffield Wednesday; attended Cramlington High School
- Steven Taylor played youth football for Cramlington Juniors F.C.

=== Other sports ===
- Stephen Miller, Paralympic triple gold medalist comes from Cramlington
- Gary Robson, professional darts player, born Cramlington
