= The Officers Club =

British menswear retailer

Officers Club
- Type: Private
- Industry: Retail
- Founded: 1990s (Sunderland)
- Headquarters: London, E17; United Kingdom
- Area served: United Kingdom
- Products: Men's Clothing; Men's Footwear; Men's Accessories
- Owner: Marlow Retail Limited
- Parent: Blue Inc (from 2011)
- Website: www.officersclub.com at the Wayback Machine (archived 2016-05-03)

The Officers Club (later just Officers Club) was a chain of men and boys' fashion stores based and operated in the United Kingdom. Its stores were mainly located in Scotland, Wales and Northern Ireland with fewer in England where Blue Inc (a former rival which purchased the brand and selected outlets in 2011) was predominant.

== Products ==
Officers Club sells fashionable clothing for men and boys. It stocks products under its own Officers Club and Twisted Soul brands but also sells other branded clothing such as American Freshman, Crosshatch and Mossimo.

== History ==
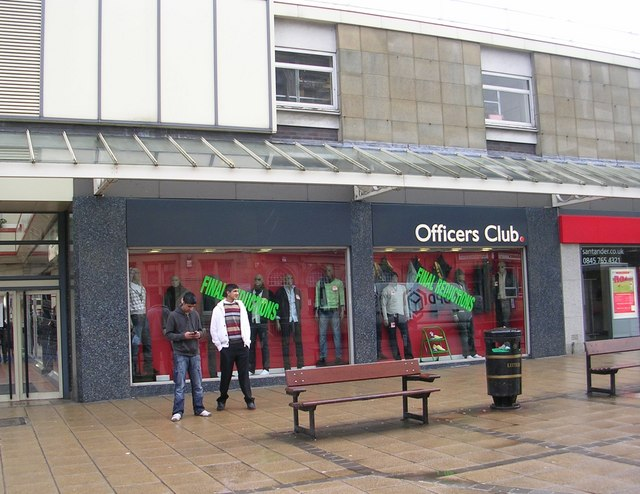
Officers Club, Keighley

The business was founded in the 1990s in Sunderland, Tyne & Wear, and latterly had its headquarters in Cramlington, Northumberland. There were over 190 stores across the country during the business's peak. Following a number of acquisitions it became one of the biggest retail companies in the UK with flagship stores in London's Oxford Street, Cardiff, Scotland and north-east England. The company also sources clothes from Asia.

Until 2004, the company ran a "70% off everything" promotion within its Officers Club branded stores. The promotion ceased after successful legal action by the Office of Fair Trading which had issued proceedings against the company in June 2002; there was evidence to suggest the supposed "original price" of garments was not genuine.

=== Administration ===
==== 2008 administration ====
In December 2008 the company entered administration, and on 23 December The Officers Club's administrators PricewaterhouseCoopers decided to close 32 of the 150 stores immediately. PricewaterhouseCoopers also announced that 118 stores had been sold to TimeC 1215 limited for an undisclosed fee. TimeC 1215 was backed by David Charlton, the then CEO of The Officers Club business. This deal saved around 900 jobs.

==== 2011 administration and sale ====
In 2011 the Officers Club had just more than 100 stores, with total of around 800 staff employed across the business. On 29 March 2011 the company entered administration again. As part of this process 47 stores were sold to rival menswear retailer Blue Inc, with staff at these stores retaining their jobs. The Officers Club brand name was also purchased and retained by the Blue Inc business.

==== 2016 administration ====
On 7 Jan 2016, parent company Blue Inc again brought in administrators to troubled Officers Club, itself owned and operated by subsidiary business "A. Levy and Sons" whom also own leases to Blue Inc's stores; there were to be around 50 affected stores.

On 21 Jan 2016 a number of Officers Club stores were closed with administration notices displayed, the majority remained open.

==== 2018 administration ====
On 10 December 2018 Officers Club & Blue Inc went into administration again.
