= Blyth Community Hospital =

- Northumbria Healthcare NHS Foundation Trust
- Shown in Northumberland

Geography
- Location: Thoroton Street, Blyth, Northumberland, England
- Coordinates: 55.1278°N 1.5171°W

Organisation
- Care system: NHS
- Type: Community

History
- Founded: 1987

Blyth Community Hospital is a health facility in Thoroton Street, Blyth, Northumberland, England. It is managed by Northumbria Healthcare NHS Foundation Trust.

== History ==
The facility, which was commissioned at the instigation of local general practitioners, opened in 1987. In 2006 concerns were raised in the UK Parliament that the minor injuries centre at the hospital might have to close.
