= Rothbury Community Hospital =

Hospital in Northumberland, England

- Northumbria Healthcare NHS Foundation Trust
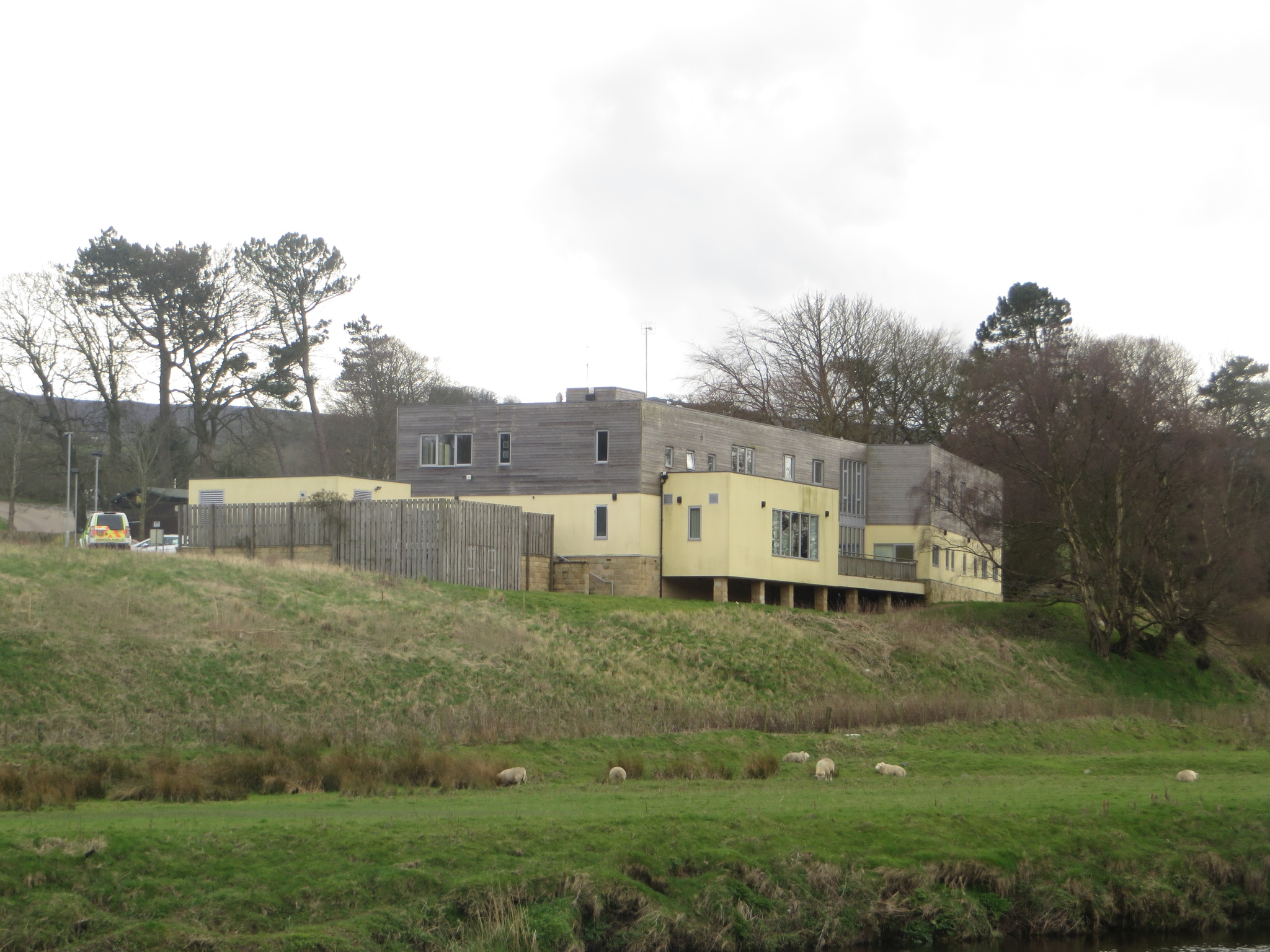
- Rothbury Community Hospital

- Shown in Northumberland

Geography
- Location: Rothbury, Northumberland, England, United Kingdom
- Coordinates: 55.3068°N 1.9138°W

Organisation
- Care system: Public NHS
- Type: Community Hospital

Services
- Emergency department: No Accident & Emergency

History
- Founded: 1905

Links
- Website: www.northumbria.nhs.uk
- Lists: Hospitals in England

Rothbury Community Hospital in Rothbury, Northumberland, England, is managed by the Northumbria Healthcare NHS Foundation Trust.

== History ==
=== Prior to Joining NHS (1872 - 1948) ===
The original facility was built as a private home known as Coquet House in 1872. It was converted into the Coquetdale Cottage Hospital in 1905. A maternity ward was added, as a lasting memorial to soldiers who died in the Second World War, in 1946.

=== Joining the NHS and Expansion (1948 - 2007) ===
It joined the National Health Service in 1948 and the adjoining Hawthorn Cottage was acquired in 1956. After Hawthorn Cottage had been converted into a physiotherapy department, it was officially reopened by Jimmy Savile in 1990.

=== New Location (2007 - present) ===
After the old hospital became dilapidated, modern facilities were built in Whitton Bank Road and opened in 2007, by local GP, Dr. Angus Armstrong, and his son, TV presenter, Alexander Armstrong. The new hospital closed to inpatients in September 2016 and in June 2019 the trust advised that a group was working on proposals for the future of remaining services at the hospital. The closure caused controversy and a local protest was established called Save Rothbury Cottage Hospital. Rothbury's Member of Parliament, Anne-Marie Trevelyan (Conservative) condemned the closure to inpatients in the House of Commons on 9 March 2017.
