= Together for Short Lives =

British charitable organization

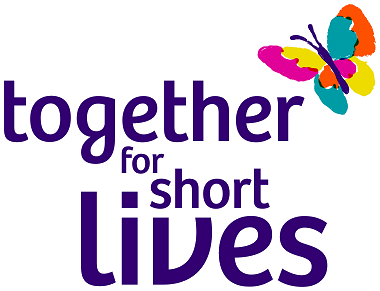
- Formation: 2011; 15 years ago
- Merger of: ACT, Children's Hospices UK
- Type: Nonprofit
- Registration no.: 1144022 (England & Wales), SC044139 (Scotland)
- Legal status: Charity
- Purpose: To secure the best quality of life and best end of life care for children who will have short lives
- Headquarters: Brunswick Court, Brunswick Square, Bristol, BS2 8PE
- Location: United Kingdom
- Chief Executive: Nick Carroll
- Website: togetherforshortlives.org.uk

Together for Short Lives is the leading UK-wide charity for children living with serious illness, their families, and the services that provide them with palliative care.

Children require support alongside their families. For families requiring palliative care, existing services may not meet demand, which can limit support for parents, siblings, and children.

Together for Short Lives’ vision is for every family to live as well as possible as they navigate their child's life, death, bereavement, and beyond.

Together for Short Lives is a registered charity in England and Wales (1144022) and Scotland (SC044139) and is a company limited by guarantee (7783702).

Together for Short Lives' president is Professor Sir Alan Craft, and Vice President is Dr Ann Goldman. Its patrons include: Simon Cowell, Dame Elizabeth Fradd DBE, FRCN, Rosa Monckton, Mason Mount, John Overton and Holly Willoughby. Rebecca Front is an ambassador for the charity, along with Alex Corbisiero and Lucy Watts MBE.

== What Together for Short Lives does ==
Together for Short Lives supports families by offering practical, emotional, and financial help. Its family support hub has advisors who listen to families, support them, and, when they’re ready, connect them to the right services and community.

Together for Short Lives unites the children's palliative care sector by prioritising and sharing crucial research, defining the children who could benefit from palliative care and how they can be supported now. The charity leads on guidance, service models, and standards and helps professionals to meet, learn, and share. The charity also raises vital funds for children’s hospice and palliative care services.

Together for Short Lives campaigns to ensure that children with serious illnesses and their families receive the care and support they need. The charity hears what families and services say, rallies the community and gives people a voice. And where the system falls short, it demands change.

== History ==
Together for Short Lives was launched as a new UK charity on 1 November 2011.

Together for Short Lives was developed as the new name for ACT & Children's Hospices UK, which merged in October 2011. Prior to the merger, ACT and Children's Hospices UK were two UK-registered charities working within children's palliative care and offering membership services to children's hospice services, children's palliative care professionals, and families.

ACT and Children's Hospices UK merged on 1 October 2011 to become one voice for children's palliative care in the UK.

ACT (Association for Children with Life-threatening and Terminal conditions) was established in 1988 under the direction of Professor David Baum, at the Institute of Child Health, Bristol, and Sister Frances Dominica, founder of Helen House hospice for children in Oxford.

ACT was established to develop an information service for families and professionals supporting them; to develop a national network for children's palliative care, and to coordinate statutory and voluntary services concerned with delivering palliative care to children and families.

Children's Hospices UK (previously known as ACH) was established in 1998 as a national umbrella charity working with independent children's hospices across the UK. It was established to provide a national voice for children's hospices by raising awareness, improving statutory funding for hospices, fostering collaboration among children's hospice services, and helping to develop professional practice.

Both ACT and Children's Hospices UK were based in Bristol, UK, and had a history of working collaboratively on awareness-raising and lobbying prior to the merger in 2011.

== Membership and services ==
Together for Short Lives is an umbrella charity for services and professionals working across children's palliative care. It offers membership to organisations, including the children's hospice and palliative care services and professionals who provide care and support to babies, children and young people with life-shortening and life-threatening conditions and their families.

== Children’s Hospice Week ==
Run by Together for Short Lives in June every year, Children’s Hospice Week is the UK’s annual awareness week for children’s hospices and palliative care services.
