= Northumbria Healthcare NHS Foundation Trust =

State healthcare provider in Northumberland, England

- Type: NHS foundation trust
- Established: 1 April 1998
- Hospitals: Alnwick Community Hospital; Berwick Infirmary; Blyth Community Hospital; Haltwhistle War Memorial Hospital; Hexham General Hospital; North Tyneside General Hospital; Northumbria Specialist Emergency Care Hospital; Rothbury Community Hospital; Wansbeck General Hospital
- Staff: 8,098 FTE (2017/18)
- Website: www.northumbria.nhs.uk

Northumbria Healthcare NHS Foundation Trust is an NHS foundation trust which provides hospital and community health services in North Tyneside and hospital, community health and adult social care services in Northumberland, England.

== History ==
The trust was established as the Northumbria Health Care NHS Trust on 1 April 1998.

== Hospitals ==
The Trust runs services at:

- Alnwick Community Hospital, Alnwick
- Berwick Infirmary, Berwick-upon-Tweed
- Blyth Community Hospital, Blyth
- Haltwhistle War Memorial Hospital, Haltwhistle
- Hexham General Hospital, Hexham
- Morpeth NHS Centre, Morpeth
- North Tyneside General Hospital, North Shields
- Northumbria Specialist Emergency Care Hospital, Cramlington
- Rothbury Community Hospital, Rothbury
- The Whalton Unit, Morpeth
- Wansbeck General Hospital, Ashington

Brian Flood, former leader of North Tyneside Council, was chairman of the trust from 1998 to 2016. Jim Mackey (knighted in 2019) was chief executive from 2003 to 2023.

== Developments ==
The trust opened the first hospital in England purpose-built for emergency care at Cramlington in June 2015: the Northumbria Specialist Emergency Care Hospital cost £75 million. It has emergency care consultants on duty at all times, and a range of specialists available seven days a week. The A&E units at Hexham, Wansbeck and North Tyneside hospitals were downgraded, and in December 2016 the opening times were reduced to 16 hours a day, in order to release staff for Cramlington where there are many more patients arriving at night.

In 2012 the trust established a subsidiary company, Northumbria Healthcare Facilities Management Ltd, to which 806 estates and facilities staff were transferred. The intention was to achieve VAT benefits, as well as pay bill savings, by recruiting new staff on less expensive non-NHS contracts. VAT benefits arise because NHS trusts can only claim VAT back on a small subset of goods and services they buy. The Value Added Tax Act 1994 provides a mechanism through which NHS trusts can qualify for refunds on contracted out services.

The trust set up a wholly owned subsidiary Northumbria Primary Care Ltd, in April 2015. It is run by local GPs and provides practice management including quality monitoring, governance and compliance, payroll, financial services, HR and estates maintenance for practices, initially Ponteland Medical Group with 11,000 patients, and Collingwood Medical Group in Blyth which serves 5,000 patients. In October 2016 it had five general practices with a list of 37,000, and claimed that the GPs were meeting patient demand more effectively. Nurse practitioners, clinical pharmacists, prescribing physiotherapists and specialist women's health doctors had been introduced into the practices.

In June 2019 the trust announced that it would be sending to between 120 and 150 patients a year to the Rutherford Cancer Centre for chemotherapy.

In January 2022 Jim Mackey announced plans for the trust to run its own domiciliary social care services, and plans to open its own care homes in order to get people out of hospital more easily.

In 2022 the trust produced the Northumbria Local Health Index, which enables them to track and address small area population health and inequalities.

== Performance ==
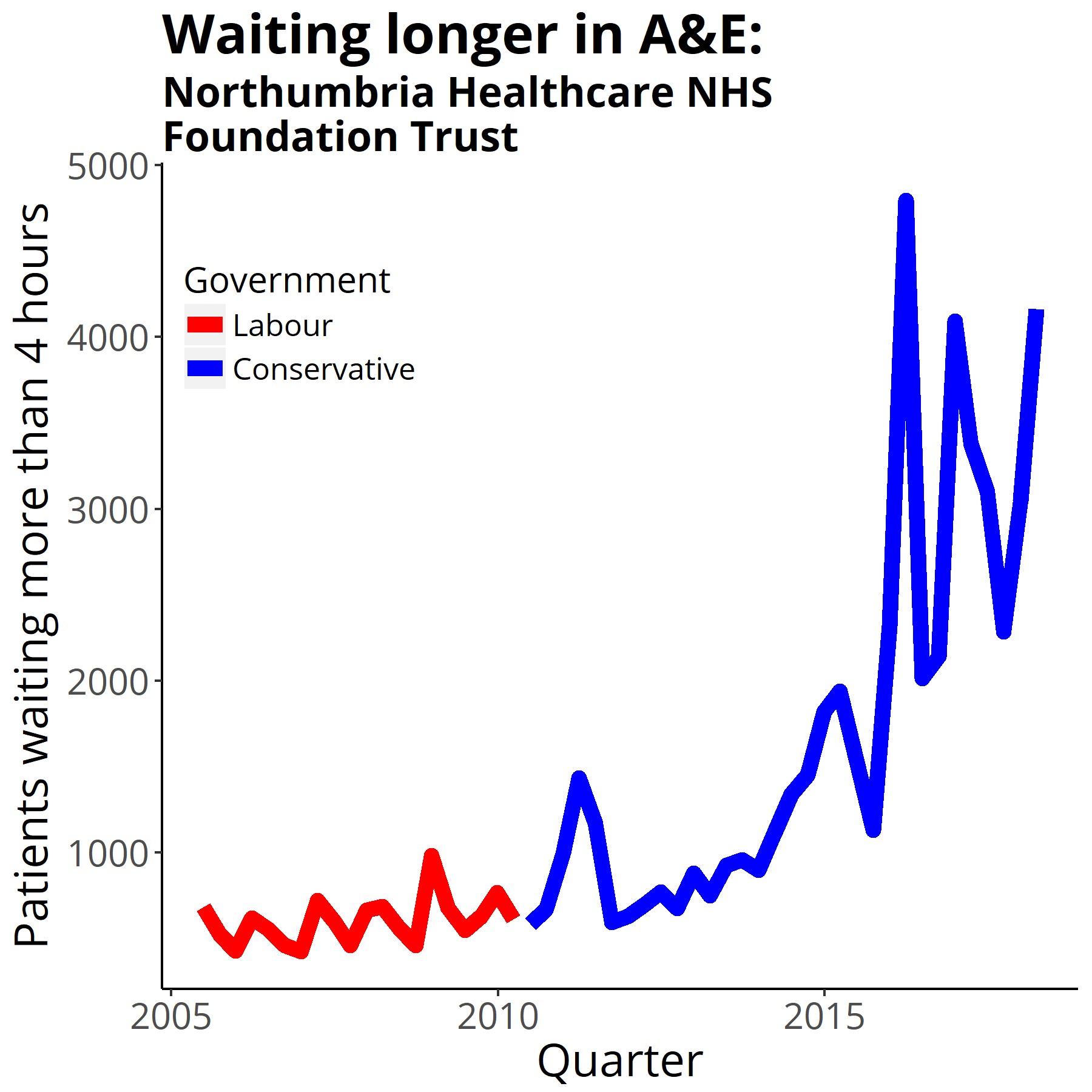
Four-hour target in the emergency department quarterly figures from NHS England Data from https://www.england.nhs.uk/statistics/statistical-work-areas/ae-waiting-times-and-activity/

In December 2013 the Trust was one of thirteen hospital trusts named by Dr Foster Intelligence as having higher than expected mortality indicator scores for the period April 2012 to March 2013 in their Hospital Guide 2013.

The Trust was the first to buy out a PFI contract, borrowing £114.2 million from Northumberland County Council in June 2014 in a deal which reduced its costs by £3.5 million per year.

It was named by the Health Service Journal as the best acute trust to work for in 2015. At that time it had 7217 full-time equivalent staff and a sickness absence rate of 4.29%. 81% of staff recommend it as a place for treatment and 72% recommended it as a place to work. In March 2016 it was ranked first in the Learning from Mistakes League.

In May 2016 the Trust received an 'outstanding' rating from the Care Quality Commission.

== See also ==
- List of NHS trusts in England
