= Blue Inc =

British fashion retailer

- Trade name: Blue Inc
- Type: Private
- Industry: Retail
- Founded: 1912; 114 years ago
- Founder: Abraham Levy
- Headquarters: London, E17; United Kingdom
- Number of locations: 41
- Area served: United Kingdom
- Products: Clothing; Footwear; Accessories
- Revenue: £114m
- Divisions: Blue Inc; Blue Inc Ladies (Pink Inc); The Officers Club (formerly)
- Website: www.blueinc.co.uk

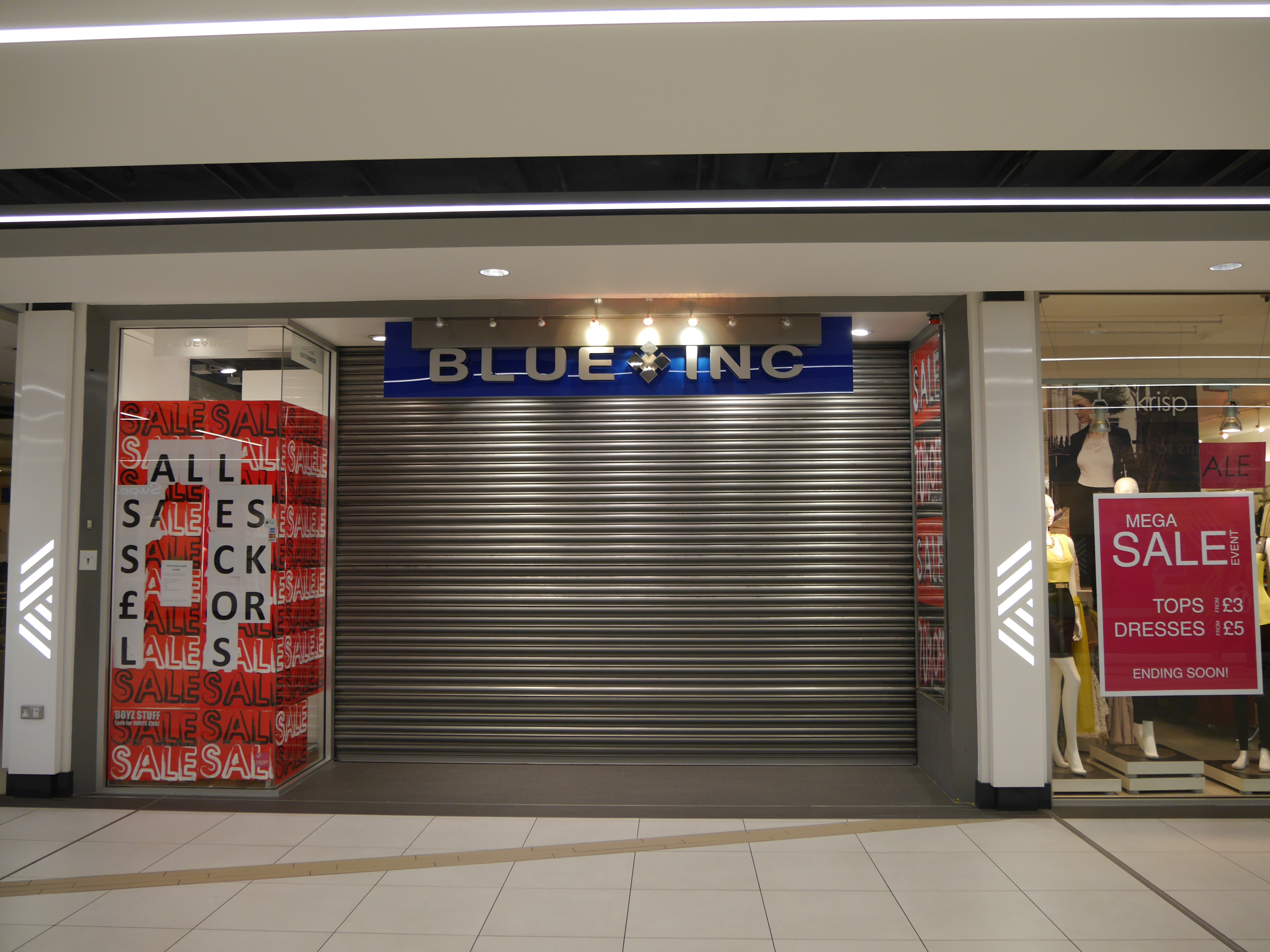
Blue Inc, Kings Mall, Hammersmith, London

Blue Inc is a fashion retailer with 41 stores based and operating across the United Kingdom. It was notable for being one of the largest menswear retailers in the country until 2016. It had stores nationwide, mainly in larger towns and cities.

Around the time of its 2016-9 administration, it had 100+ stores across the United Kingdom. The business also traded under both The Officers Club and Blue Inc names.

In February 2019, it was brought out of administration by Rerun Limited, reopened 18 stores and are currently reopening more stores around the UK.

== History ==
Blue Inc has its origin in a company founded by Abraham Levy which began trading as A. Levy & Sons, a hat shop in Stratford, east London. The company traded via a number of brands, chiefly as Mr Byrite, a chain of discount stores selling menswear. The company expanded rapidly in the 1980s, and was then run by the three children of Barry Levy – Jonathan, Robert and Daniel (the last later became known as the chairman of Tottenham Hotspur).

Blue Inc as a brand first appeared in 1997, aimed at younger men who desire an alternative and low-priced image combined with an eye-catching street look. It had a flagship store on London's Oxford Street, while the main UK chain is based in principally-located town and city centres, and major shopping centres. Traditionally a menswear retailer, Blue Inc now also offers womenswear, boyswear and girlswear ranges within selected stores.

In 2006, Marlow Retail Ltd purchased the business.

In 2009, the company launched its transactional e-commerce website.

In March 2011, Blue Inc expanded with the purchase of 47 stores from collapsed rival The Officers Club, retaining them under the Officers Club brand name.

In 2012, the business went on to purchase 20 stores from the administrators of the boyswear and menswear retailer D2, expanding the Blue Inc business to over 200 stores across the country. All D2 stores were rebranded Blue Inc later that year.

In 2013, following the failure of the Republic fashion chain, five stores were acquired from landlords and this was used as a catalyst to increase Blue Inc's womenswear offering, which for a time, had used the Pink Inc name.

=== Administration ===
In January 2016, Blue Inc called in the administrators on behalf of A.Levy and Sons (their then parent company) who owned the store leases for Blue Inc and Officers Club. Immediately afterwards, a store closure process ensued resulting in a number of closures across both trading brand names, many however remain open.

== Products ==
Blue Inc offered fashionable men's, women's, boy's and girl's clothing; from formal products and suits, to casualwear at competitively low prices from multiple brands. It sold its own products under the Blue Inc, Officers Club or Twisted Soul brand names but also stocked other brands such as Adidas, Mossimo and Polo Ralph Lauren.
