= Annitsford =

Village in Tyne and Wear, England

Coordinates: 55.060°N 1.579°W

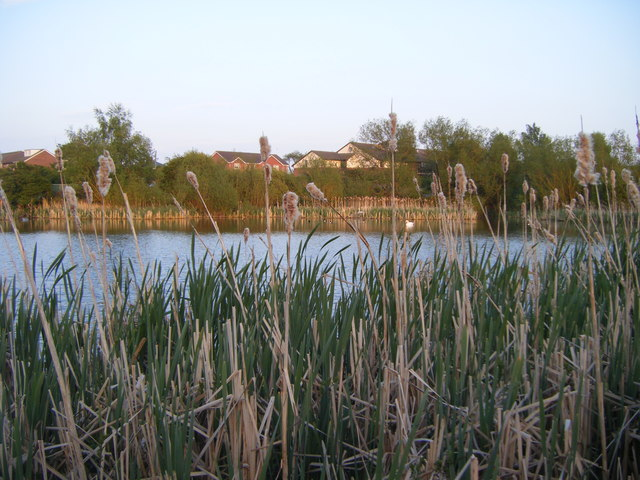
- Annitsford Pond

- Location within Tyne and Wear
- OS grid reference: NZ2674
- Metropolitan borough: North Tyneside
- Unitary authority: Northumberland
- Metropolitan county: Tyne and Wear
- Ceremonial county: Northumberland
- Region: North East
- Country: England
- Sovereign state: United Kingdom
- Police: Northumbria
- Fire: Tyne and Wear
- Ambulance: North East
- UK Parliament: North Tyneside

Annitsford is a semi-rural village located in North Tyneside (formerly South East Northumberland), on the border between Tyne and Wear and Northumberland. The main conurbation of the village falls under the jurisdiction of the Borough of North Tyneside in Tyne and Wear. The village is known locally as 'The Ford'. Annitsford has its own pond, as well as the rivers sandys letch and the seaton burn which run through or near the village.

== History ==
The name of the village is the modern-day version of Annet's Ford, which was a crossing place over the Seaton Burn which flows eastward through the village. The word ford means crossing but the meaning of Annet is not known. Annitsford borders the villages of Dudley and Fordley, the former taking its name from the son of the mine owner, the latter taking its name from the last part of the village names for Annitsford and Dudley.

The ford was replaced by a bridge due to it being described as dangerous after rain.

During the First World War, men from Annitsford primarily enlisted into the 6th Battalion, The Rifles, of the Northumberland Fusiliers; the battalion formed part of the Northumberland Brigade, Northumbria Division. The battalion saw action at: the Second Battle of Ypres; Battle of the Somme (1916); Battle of Arras (1917); Third Battle of Ypres; First Battle of the Somme (1918); and the Battle of the Lys (1918). Photographs of some of the men have been made available by Newcastle City Library's "Annitsford at War" project, with the original photographs from the Illustrated Chronicle.

During the Second World War, some men from Annitsford again enlisted into the Royal Northumberland Fusiliers, and saw action during the Nazi blitzkrieg in France and the Low Countries, as well as the miracle of Dunkirk.

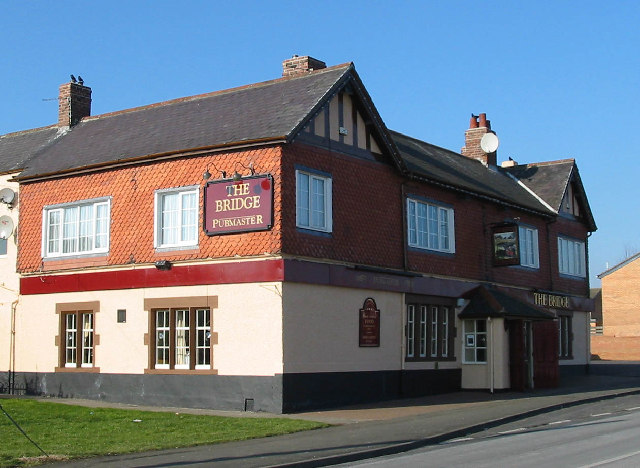
The Bridge

There is one public house in the village, The Bridge (formerly The Bridge Inn) and it is over 140 years old. It is shown on maps of the village dated 1864, together with the Annitsford Brewery (Annetsford Brewery). This was resited further along the village in later years, and which in later life was a soft drink factory (Dickmans), turning into a transport café circa early 1970s. The premises is now shared by an Indian takeaway (Annitsford Tandoori) and a Fish & Chip shop (K&L Fisheries). The Bridge Inn was for many years in the custodianship of the Swinhoe family, culminating in its massive popularity as a Steak House with a reputation regionwide, throughout the seventies and eighties until the retirement of Gladys & Bill Swinhoe. The fortunes of the pub have not hit those heights since. There are two (CIU) Working Men's Social Clubs in the village, The Pioneer & the United Irish League (The Ranch). Annitsford Social Club, formed in 1898, was the first to take advantage of the Friendly Societies Act which allowed for the creation of social clubs.

The village was one of those surrounding Dudley which provided men to work in the local collieries such as Weetslade Colliery and Burradon Colliery.

Local Children went to work down the mines at 14.

The Weetslade colliery opened in 1906 and provided over 1000 tons of coal in a year at its peak but this is just one local colliery and Annitsford did not have its own colliery.

The local Burradon tower may be the oldest monument surrounding the village, it was created during the peak of border-rieving. The tower fell into dissuse following the end of the conflict between Scotland and England. It was likely used to defend from raiding gangs from Scotland.

== Religion ==
The village school, Annitsford First School was closed and demolished, eventually making way for a housing development. The same fate fell a number of years earlier to the village's Catholic school and chapel (Annitsford RC Primary), which was built in 1871. The village has a history of strong Irish Catholic links formed by the immigrant workers who came over in the late 19th century to find work in the nearby mines of Dudley and Weetslade.

An early mention of Annitsford was made by the son of atheist Liberal MP Charles Bradlaugh (who founded the National Secular Society), writing of his father's experiences in travelling through Northern England in the late 19th Century:

"I should like also to note here the open-mindedness shown about this time by a Catholic priest at Seghill. Mr Bradlaugh was to lecture in the colliery schoolroom on "The Land, the People, and the Coming Struggle," but almost at the last moment the authorities would have none of such a wicked man. Upon hearing this a Catholic priest named Father O'Dyer allowed the lecture to take place in his chapel at Annitsford, and he himself took the chair. Mr Bradlaugh, of course, greatly appreciated this unlooked-for kindness on the part of Father O'Dyer, though in his surprise at such unwonted conduct he might humorously comment "the age of miracles has recommenced".

The Annitsford Roman Catholic Church, St John The Baptist R.C. Church still stands on the northern edge of the village, but with boundary and road changes, the modern-day person would regard this as being part of the southern edge of Cramlington. The church is very impressive for a village of its size. In the grounds of the church is buried one of Annitsford's most famous sons, the world-renowned opera singer Owen Brannigan. Brannigan was prevalent in "the post-war era: principal bass at Covent Garden Opera House, the supreme police sergeant in The Pirates of Penzance, as well as a noted performer of Geordie songs". Descendants of Brannigan's family still live in the village and a street is named after him, in nearby Fordley, Owen Brannigan Drive. Not to be outdone, the Methodists also had their own smaller chapel which stood at the entrance to the Annitsford Welfare, home for many years to Annitsford Football Club. There is now a local football team called "New Fordley Juniors".

== Expansion ==
Annitsford was a small village until it grew considerably circa 1969 when the old terraced streets of Jubilee Terrace, Jackson Street and Lee Street were demolished, and the residents moved into new local authority built houses comprising Wardle Drive, Annitsford Drive and Hudson Avenue. In doing so the natural green field boundary keeping Annitsford and Fordley apart disappeared. More housing was built on the land formerly occupied by the terraces and was called Harrison Court, together with the sheltered accommodation development of Jubilee Court. Further housing developments have been built on the west edge of the village (The Wyndings) and the east edge (The Spinney), increasing the overall size of the village considerably.

Politically, Annitsford is located at the northernmost part of North Tyneside Constituency, held by Labour MP Mary Glindon since 2010. Within North Tyneside Council, the village is located within Camperdown and Weetslade Wards, with both electing three councillors each; all six are Labour.
