= Brigitte C. Widemann =

German-American pediatric oncologist

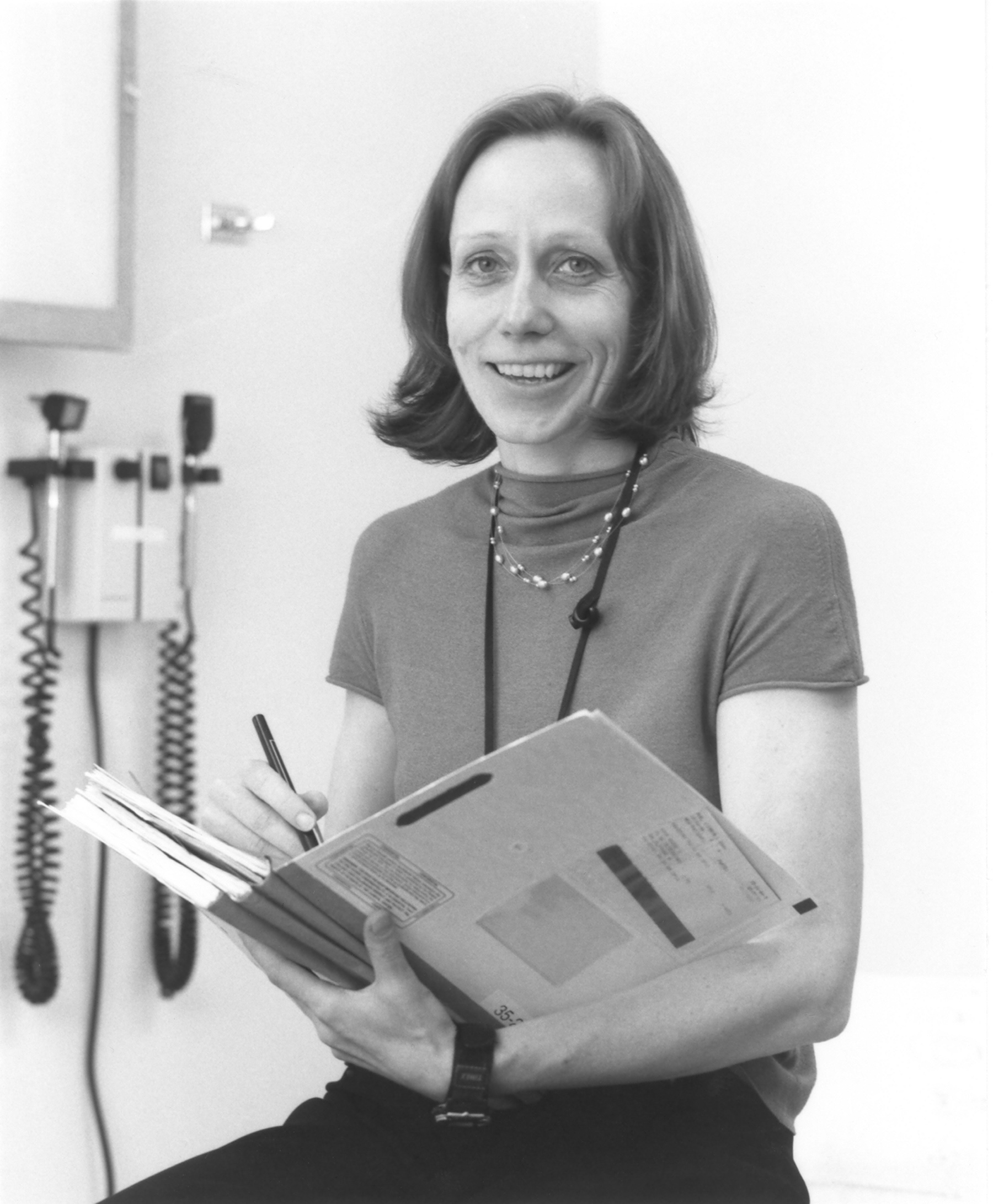
- Widemann in 2001
- Education: University of Cologne
- Awards: Samuel J. Heyman Service to America Medal finalist (2021); Top Ten Clinical Research Achievement Award (NIH, 2021)
- Scientific career
- Fields: Pediatric oncology
- Workplaces: National Institutes of Health National Cancer Institute

Brigitte C. Widemann is German-American pediatric oncologist. She is chief of the pediatric oncology branch and clinical deputy director of the center for cancer research at the National Cancer Institute. She is also the special advisor to the NCI director for childhood cancer.

== Life ==
Widemann is a pediatric oncologist specialized in developing therapies for children and adults with genetic tumor predisposition syndromes, such as neurofibromatosis type I (NF1), and rare solid tumors. She completed a pediatric residency at the University of Cologne. Widemann then moved to the National Institutes of Health (NIH) for a pediatric hematology and oncology fellowship in the Pediatric Oncology Branch of the National Cancer Institute (NCI). She conducted research in the Pharmacology and Experimental Therapeutics Section (PETS), where she studied antimetabolites and had a leadership role in the clinical development of glucarpidase, a rescue agent for patients who experience renal failure after administration of high-dose methotrexate.

Dr. Brigitte Widemann with NF1 patient Travis Carpenter

Widemann established a clinical research program to study the natural history of NF1 and develop clinical trials for patients with peripheral nerve sheath tumors. After a series of clinical trials, Widemann’s team led the phase II registration trial of the MEK inhibitor selumetinib, which resulted in the first ever Food and Drug Administration (FDA) approval of a medical therapy for NF1 related inoperable plexiform neurofibromas in children with NF1. Widemann expanded these efforts to other rare tumors and is a founding member of the NCI Rare Tumor Initiative and a co-leader on the Cancer Moonshot funded My Pediatric and Adult Rare Tumor Network (MyPART). Widemann heads the Pharmacology & Experimental Therapeutics Section, as Chief of NCI’s Pediatric Oncology Branch, and as a clinical Deputy Director of the Center for Cancer Research (CCR). She is the special advisor to the NCI director for childhood cancer.

Widemann and her team were finalists for the 2021 Samuel J. Heyman Service to America Medal under the science and environment category. Widemann was also named a Top Ten Clinical Research Achievement Awardee by the NIH in 2021
