= Cramlington Learning Village =

Location
- Highburn; Cramlington, Northumberland, NE23 6BN; England; 55.0766°N 1.5925°W

Information
- Type: Academy
- Established: 1969 as Cramlington Community High School; 2008 as Cramlington Learning Village
- Specialist: Science College; Vocational education
- Department for Education URN: 137457 Tables
- Ofsted: Reports
- Head teacher: Jon Bird and Kim Irving
- Gender: Coeducational
- Age: 11 to 19
- Enrolment: 2,178
- Colour: Red Gold Blue Green Purple Black
- Website: cramlingtonlv.co.uk

Cramlington Learning Village, formerly Cramlington Community High School, is a large high school with academy status in Cramlington, Northumberland, England; it is a comprehensive school of around 2100 students.

The school became an 11–18 school in September 2008 as part of a local authority reorganisation of education in the town which saw the former three-tier system, of first, middle and high schools, become a two-tier system of primary and secondary schools. The school takes students aged 11 to 18 years, the latter two school years in the Sixth Form.

== History ==
The school was established in 1969 as Cramlington County High School, after the upgrading of Cramlington to a new town under the New Towns Act 1946. In line with Northumberland Local Education Authority's other high schools, the name was changed to Cramlington Community High School in the early 1990s as part of a scheme that enabled wider community use of the schools. Though a second high school was originally planned, as of 2026, it remains the only secondary school in the town.

Former head teachers include Peter Dines CBE, Daniel Joseph Wilks PhD, later the Chief Executive of the Schools Council from 1988 to 1993 and the National Curriculum Council, Angus Taylor OBE and Derek Wise CBE (born 6 June 1949). Wise, head from 1990 until 2010, led a turnaround in the school's performance and began to implement the process of "Accelerated Learning" in 1997. By 2004, it was performing significantly above local authority and national averages on all key measures.

For a number of years, the school used the tagline "where the science of learning meets the art of teaching". Wise, along with former deputy headteacher Mark Lovatt, wrote Creating an Accelerated Learning School, a book explaining their implementation of accelerated learning techniques.

Wendy Heslop succeeded Wise as headteacher. Upon her retirement in 2021, she had worked at the school for 35 years. Jon Bird and Kim Irving were then appointed Co-Heads in the same year.

It had Science College status and was later awarded a second specialism in vocational education. In 2003, it was selected as one of the nation's Leading Edge schools by the office of Public Service Reform (Cabinet Office).

== Campus and buildings ==
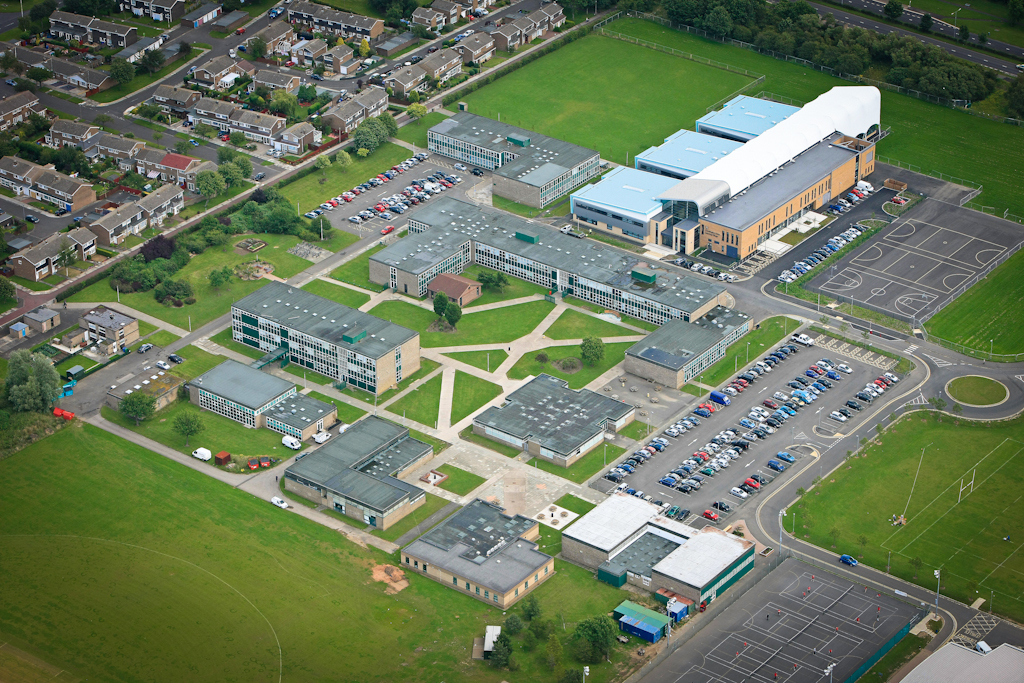
The school campus

The school is divided into separate "villages":

- the Junior Learning Village – years 7 and 8
- the Senior Learning Village – years 9 to 11
- and the Advanced Learning Village – years 12 and 13 (Sixth Form).

The original buildings were constructed in 1969, consisting of a tin-plastic mixture, using the Consortium of Local Authorities Special Programme building system. A number of additional buildings have been added over the years, and the originals blocks were reclad in the 1990s.

The main buildings now include two 'blocks', Inspire and Innovate, with classrooms focusing on English, Maths, Science and Languages, 'Imagine' (a design, craft, food and ICT block), two dining halls attached to Inspire and Innovate (known as Inspire Café and Innovate Café respectively), 'Investigate' focusing on Humanities, the 'Learning Plaza', which is a mixture of a social area frequented by Years 9 to 11 (formerly the Social Block) equipped with computers, conferencing facilities. Additionally there is an Applied Learning Centre (formerly Music and Drama) where subjects such as construction and computer science are taught.

More recent additions to the school's architecture include the Advanced Learning Village (formerly Sixth Form Centre), built in 1996 to house A-Level students. It features a large seating area, small café and the Independent Learning Centre, a room for self-study with computers. There are also two small classrooms for Sixth Form specific subjects such as sociology, psychology and politics.

The Sporting Club, opened 12 February 2002, is another later addition to the site. It was originally owned by Northumberland County Council until 1 January 2022, when ownership of the sports facilities were transferred the school itself. The centre is used by students for physical education, it houses a fitness suite, dance studio and tennis courts. There are also several fields (for football, rugby and cricket), a student-built cricket pavilion, and Astroturf suitable for play even during wet weather. There are also several large halls in other buildings suitable for indoor sports.

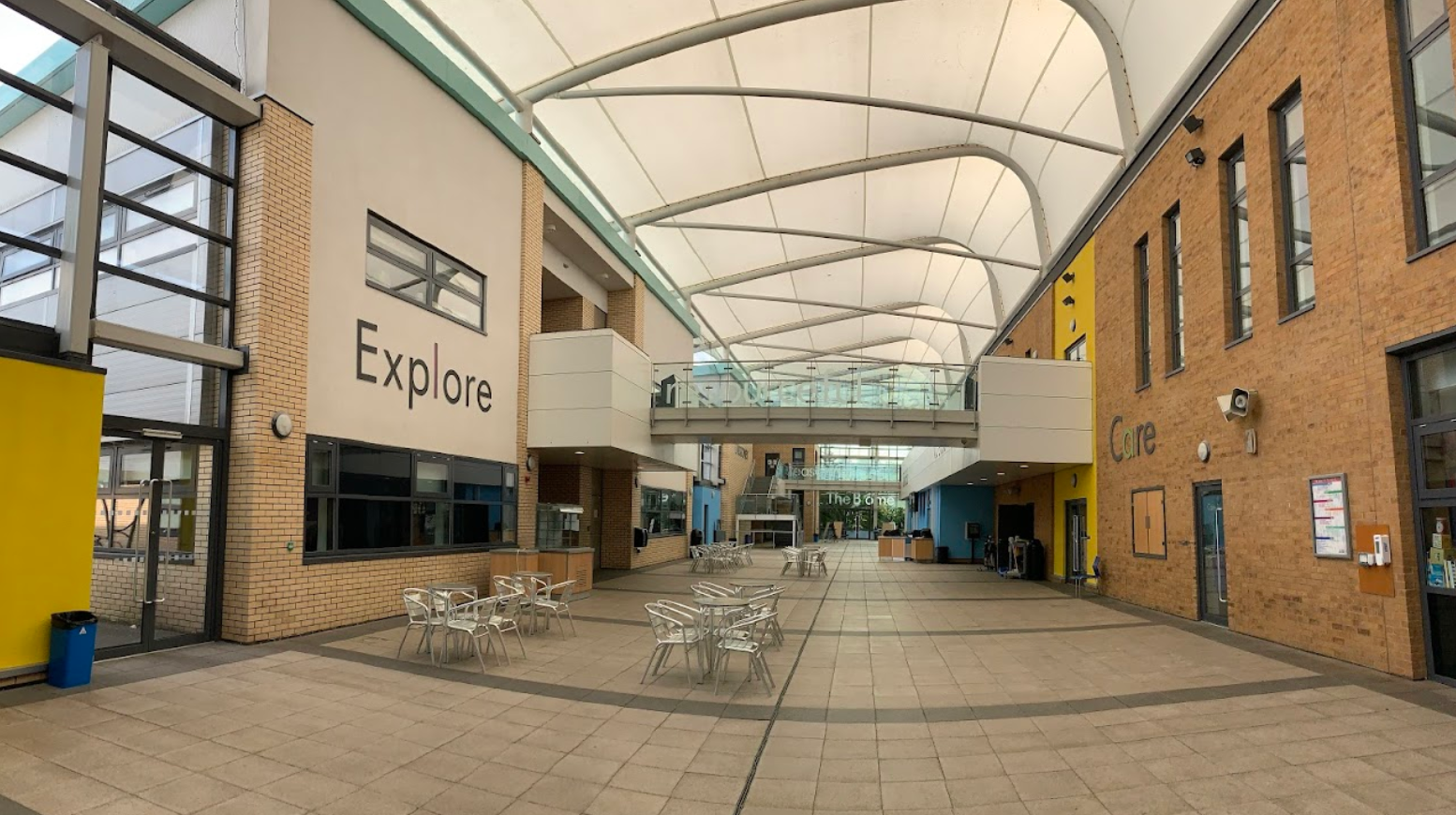
The JLV is part of Cramlington Learning Village's campus and includes a central 'street' area.

The most recent addition, completed in the summer of 2008, is the Junior Learning Village. The centre contains resources for teaching Years 7 and 8 after the council reforms of 11 September 2001 which moved the education system in Northumberland to the two-tier system after decades of using the three-tier system. Also contained within are resources for music and performing arts. The building is made up of other isolated 'blocks' called Enquire, Explore, Discover, Create, Communicate and Care. Other features of the JLV include its "Village" street, open science Learning Plaza, Knowledge Café, Pasta King and flexible learning spaces.

The school also uses a three-dimensional screen across the curriculum and the 'Biome' which was the result of a bid through the "Faraday" project designed to take the teaching of science into the 21st century. The building also has a multipurpose space called 'The Hub' which is used for assemblies, conferences, socialising at lunchtimes and hosting live shows and performances for music and drama/performing arts.

=== School redevelopment works ===
In July 2022, it was announced that the school had been selected to be rebuilt as part of the Department for Education's School Rebuilding Programme, where all of the original buildings were scheduled for replacement due to poor condition.

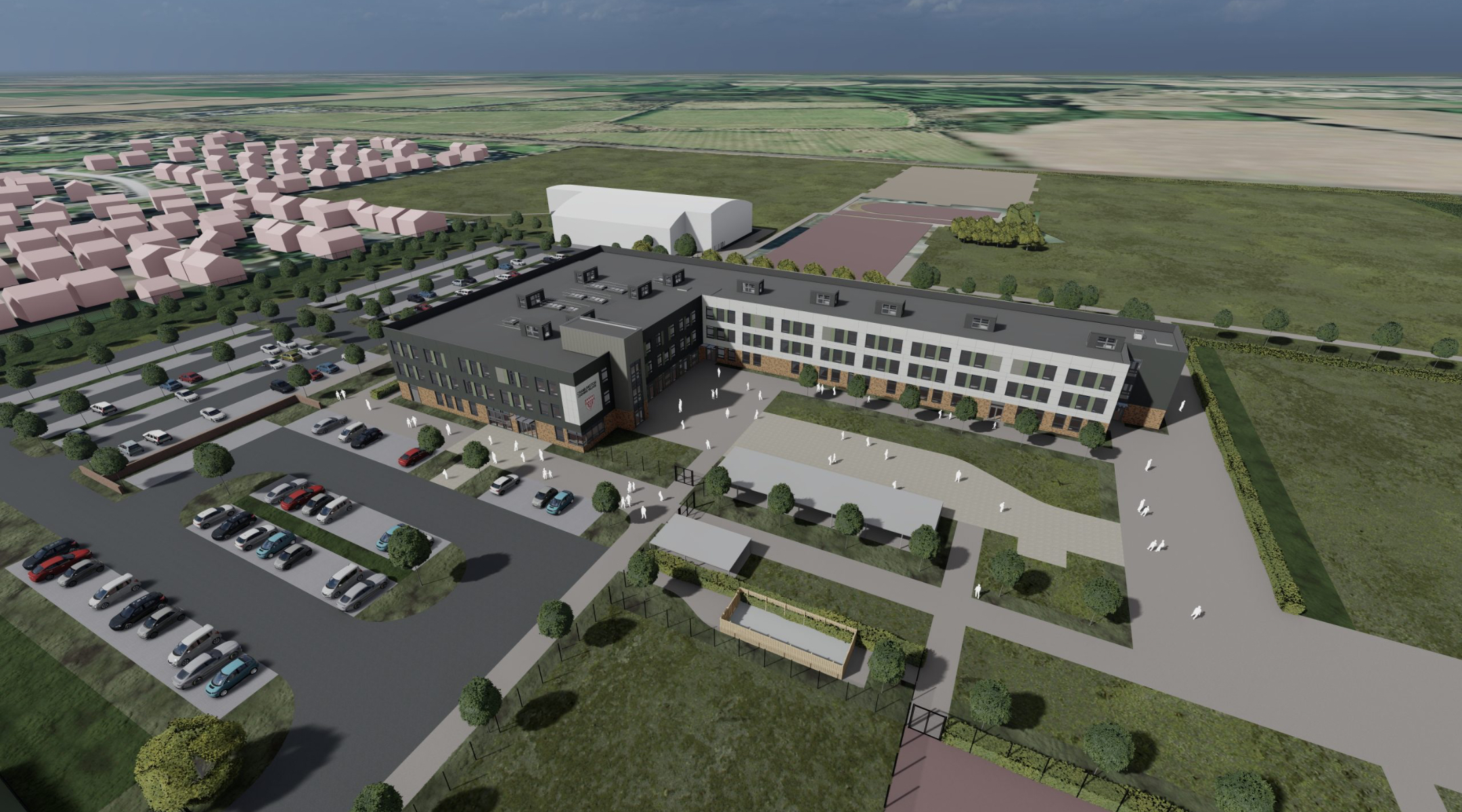
Proposed development

In October 2024, plans were revealed for the construction of a new three-storey teaching complex in the location of the previous car park and southern playing field. Bowmer + Kirkland was the appointed contractor for the overall build, with MGL Group being tasked with various structural works, including the demolition of 9 of the original buildings.

In May 2025, it was announced by the school that the development would go ahead. This came after it was brought to the attention of Northumberland County Council's Planning Committee and gained unanimous support. The school's sixth form, the Advanced Learning Village, is also planned to be incorporated into the new complex with an Independent Learning Centre on the ground floor. The contractors confirmed that the total cost of the build was to be £49.8 million.

Construction officially commenced on 15 September 2025, where the contractors secured the build area with hoarding fences, and the formal 'ground breaking' ceremony took place on 22 October 2025. On that day, local councillors were informed of the overall extent of the build, with some attending the ceremony for a presentation from the contractors. The build is to take place in four main phases:

- Phase 1 (site groundwork and new car park) - August 2025 to February 2026
- Phase 2 (school building construction) - February 2026 to October 2027
- Phase 3A (demolition) - Summer/Autumn 2028
- Phase 3B (landscaping work), full site completion - November 2028

The school was presented with a commemorative engraved spade to signify the start of construction on the site. Bowmer + Kirkland has set the full site completion date for 24 November 2028, if all work is completed on schedule.

The new car park opened to the public on 23 February 2026. The old car park was closed to allow for the new 10,000m² school building to be constructed into the north of the school site.

== Facilities ==
=== Technology ===
The school has over 1500 PCs on site, with at least some in every classroom. Classrooms are also equipped with a teacher's PC, projector, interactive whiteboard and speakers. The school has its own monthly payment scheme for the provision of mobile devices to students. Initially, a Samsung Galaxy tablet was offered. From September 2014 onwards, the scheme provided Chromebooks for Year 7s, before being opened to all year groups the following year.

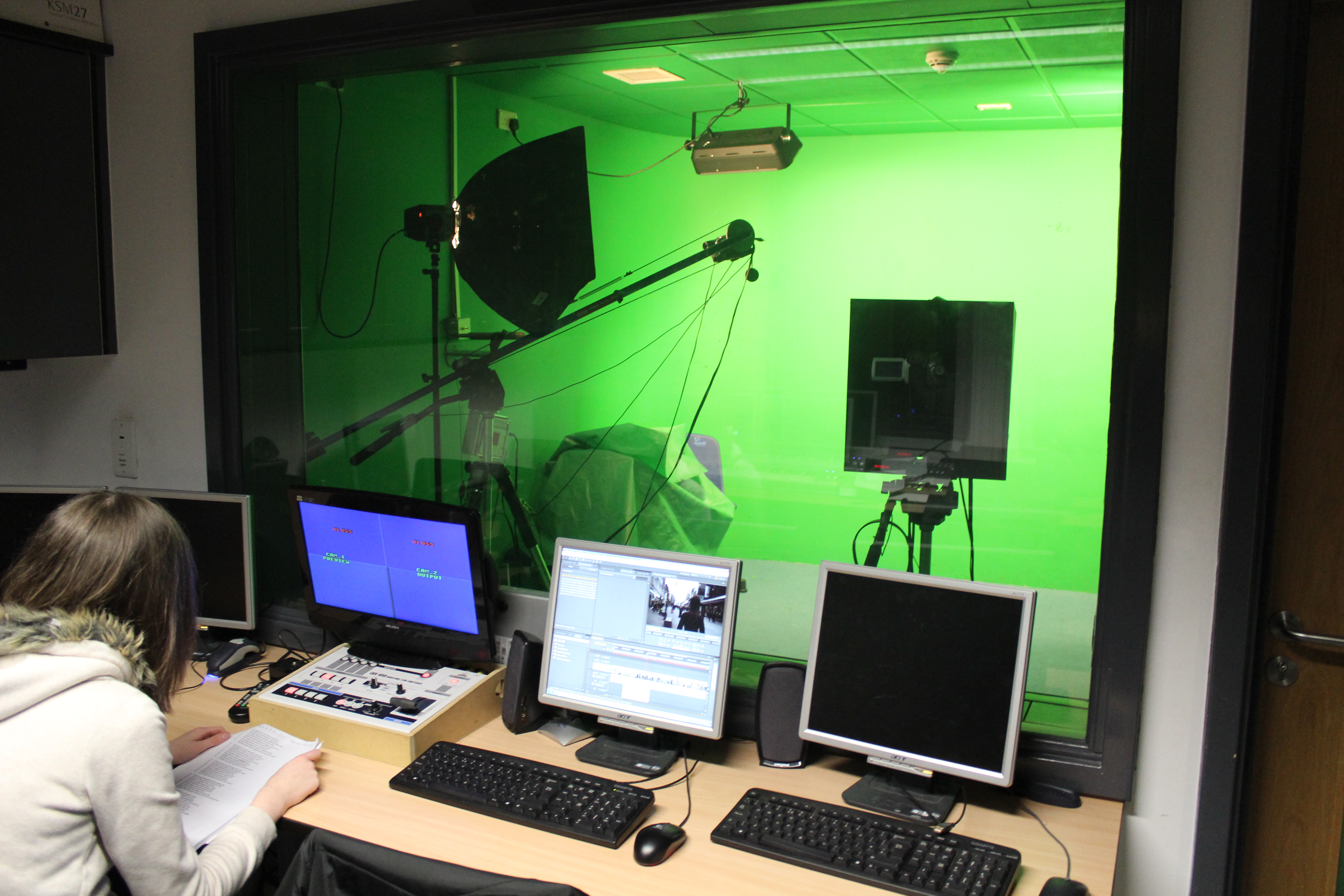
The JLV TV Studio which has 2 cameras, an autocue, vision mixer, sound desk, green screen and computers. On the opposite side featuring two musical recording rooms, featuring a piano and electronic drum set.

In the late 1990s, the school began to develop its own Intranet, initially hosted subject-specific pages, but later also hosting online lesson plans for staff and student access. It has since implemented a Frog VLE (Virtual learning environment), offering access to timetables, attendance and punctuality, home learning facilities, school notices, a cashless catering provision and reward system. Parents are provided with their own access to the portal with specific information for their child.

'The Hub', a fully functional music venue, features a sound and lighting control systems and a 3D projection installation.

Further facilities include a recording studio, with two live rooms, and a TV studio, with green screen for chroma key. The studios have the capability to broadcast live across the school campus.

== Ofsted ==
The school's most recent inspection, published in July 2026, recognises the school to be performing to a 'strong standard' in five of the areas reported, and to 'expected standard' in two areas. This comes after Ofsted reformed their grading system to move away from 1-word overall judgements of schools.

It had previously been rated Good in two inspections published in May 2022 and February 2017. Having previously been rated Outstanding in four successive Ofsted ratings up until 2013, an inspection in July 2015, however, found the school to be Inadequate and placed it in Special Measures. The review proved controversial, being featured on the local television news on the evening of the report's publication. A monitoring inspection, the report of which was published in October 2016, removed the Special Measures status, allowing the school to once again recruit newly qualified teachers.

== Notable alumni ==
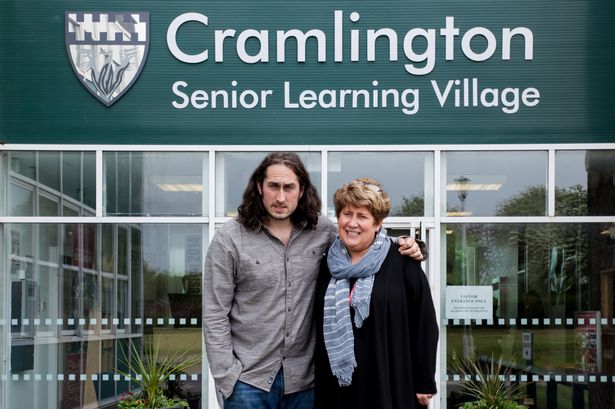
Ross Noble with Cramlington Learning Village headmistress Wendy Heslop, his former English teacher

- Martin Brittain, former Newcastle United footballer
- James Brown, former footballer with Hartlepool United
- Mark Clattenburg, football referee who refereed the 2016 UEFA Champions League Final and UEFA Euro 2016 Final
- Stephen Miller, gold medal-winning British paralympics athlete
- Alex Nicholson, footballer who plays for Gateshead
- Ross Noble, stand-up comedian and actor. In 2007, voted the 10th-greatest stand-up comic on Channel 4's 100 Greatest Stand-Ups
- Graeme Owens, former footballer who played for Middlesbrough
- Martin Taylor, footballer who played in the Premier League for Blackburn Rovers and Birmingham City
