= Hexham General Hospital =

- Northumbria Healthcare NHS Foundation Trust
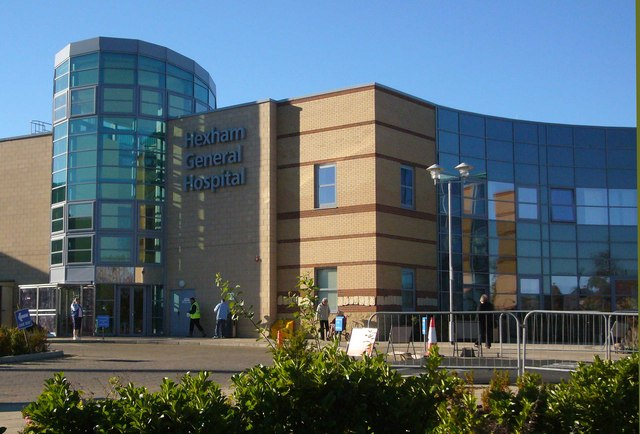
- Main Entrance to Hexham General Hospital

- Shown in Northumberland

Geography
- Location: Hexham, Northumberland, England, United Kingdom
- Coordinates: 54.9692°N 2.0945°W

Organisation
- Care system: National Health Service
- Type: District General

Services
- Emergency department: No Accident & Emergency

History
- Founded: 1940

Links
- Website: www.northumbria.nhs.uk/our-locations/hexham-general-hospital/
- Lists: Hospitals in England

Hexham General Hospital is an acute general hospital in Hexham, Northumberland, England. It is managed by the Northumbria Healthcare NHS Foundation Trust.

== History ==
The hospital has its origins in a facility built to treat wounded soldiers during the Second World War. It opened in 1940 and joined the National Health Service in 1948. At that time the hospital management took the opportunity to acquire the old workhouse buildings on an adjacent site to create administrative facilities for the hospital.

A new hospital was procured under a Private Finance Initiative ('PFI') contract in 2001. It was designed by Jonathan Bailey Associates and built by Bovis Lend Lease at a cost of £54 million. It was officially opened by Tony Blair, Prime Minister, in January 2004. In June 2014, the Trust announced that it had borrowed sufficient funds from Northumberland County Council at a low rate of interest to pay off the consortium who had developed the hospital and buy itself out of the PFI contract. (Note: West Park Hospital is another example of the Trust buying itself out of the PFI contract)
