= Wansbeck General Hospital =

- Northumbria Healthcare NHS Foundation Trust
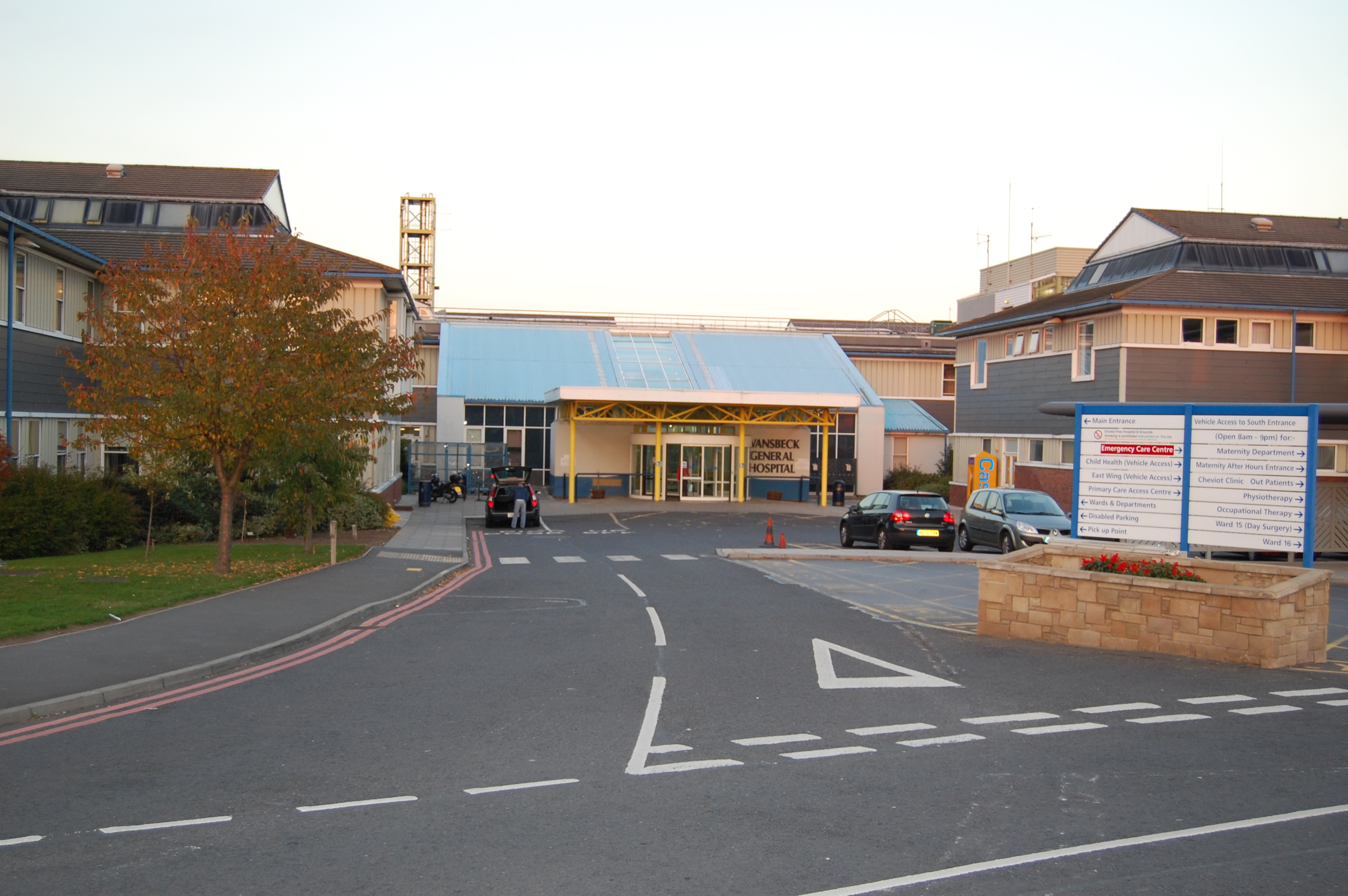
- Wansbeck General Hospital

- Shown in Northumberland

Geography
- Location: Ashington, Northumberland, England, United Kingdom
- Coordinates: 55°11′04″N 1°32′45″W

Organisation
- Care system: Public NHS
- Type: District General
- Affiliated university: Newcastle University Medical School

Services
- Emergency department: No Accident & Emergency
- Beds: 384

History
- Founded: June 1993

Links
- Website: www.northumbria.nhs.uk
- Lists: Hospitals in England

Wansbeck General Hospital is a district general hospital based in Ashington, Northumberland, England. It is managed by Northumbria Healthcare NHS Foundation Trust.

== History ==
The first phase of the hospital, which was designed for low energy consumption, secured a "Green Building of the Year Award" after it was completed in June 1993. The second phase, which followed the transfer of services from the old Ashington Hospital, was procured under a Private Finance Initiative contract in 2000. The new facility was designed by Reiach and Hall Architects and built by M J Gleeson at a cost of £18 million; it was officially opened by Alan Milburn, Secretary of State for Health in 2003.

A new simulation-based training centre was opened by the Duchess of Northumberland in November 2016 and a new oncology day unit was opened in July 2017.

The hospital has a walk-in urgent care centre, 12 wards and various outpatient clinics.

== See also ==
- List of hospitals in England
