= North Tyneside General Hospital =

- Northumbria Healthcare NHS Foundation Trust
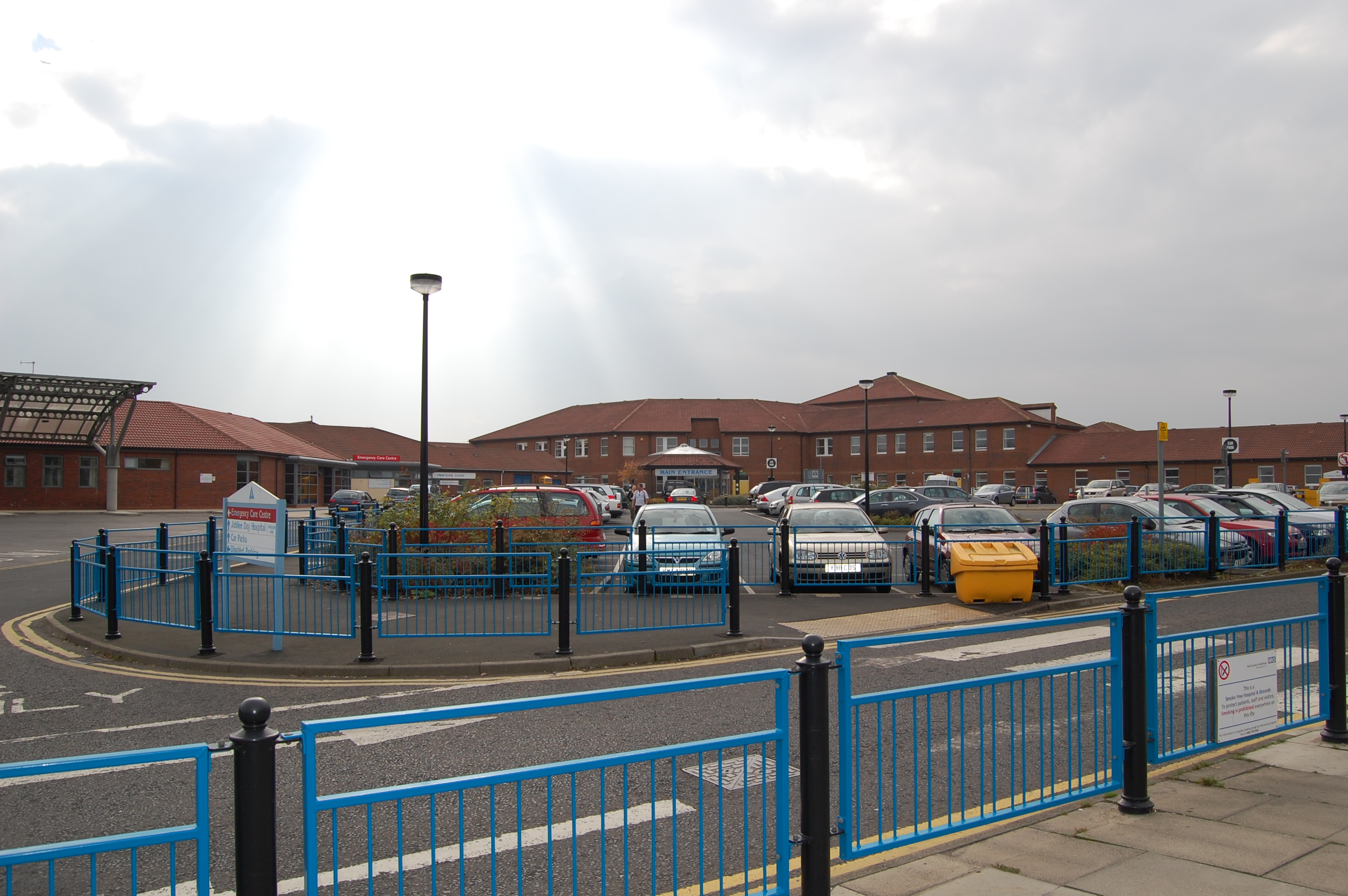
- North Tyneside General Hospital

- Location in Tyne and Wear

Geography
- Location: Rake Lane, North Shields, Tyne and Wear, England
- Coordinates: 55.025°N 1.467°W

Organisation
- Care system: NHS
- Type: District General
- Affiliated university: Newcastle University Medical School

Services
- Emergency department: No

History
- Founded: 1984

Links
- Website: www.northumbria.nhs.uk/our-locations/north-tyneside-general-hospital
- Lists: Hospitals in England

North Tyneside General Hospital (commonly referred to as Rake Lane Hospital) is a district general hospital located on Rake Lane in Preston, North Shields, Tyne and Wear. It is managed by Northumbria Healthcare NHS Foundation Trust.

== History ==
The hospital, which replaced several other local hospitals, was built between 1984 and 1985 and was officially opened by Princess Alexandra in May 1985. In May 2018 it was announced that the urgent care centre at the hospital would no longer be available but instead the hospital would offer a GP-led healthcare service.

== See also ==
- List of hospitals in England
