= Delaval =

English landowners and industrialists in Northumberland (c.1520–1752)

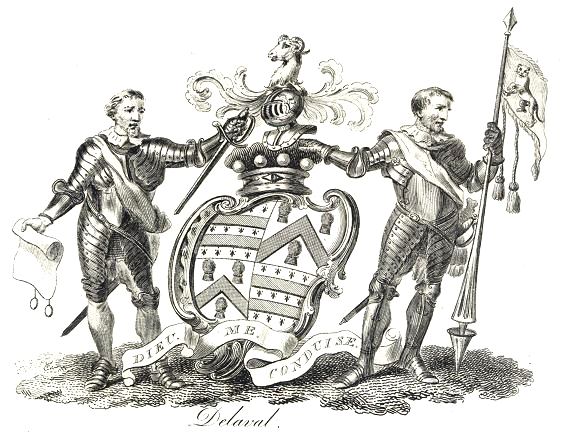
Coat of arms of Baron Delaval

The Delaval family is an aristocratic family in Northumberland, England, from the 11th century to the 19th century. Their main estate was the manor of Seaton Delaval. The 18th century Delavals are noteworthy for their colourful lifestyle, for the magnificent Seaton Delaval Hall and for the development of the little seaport of Seaton Sluice and a coal mine at Old Hartley.

== History ==
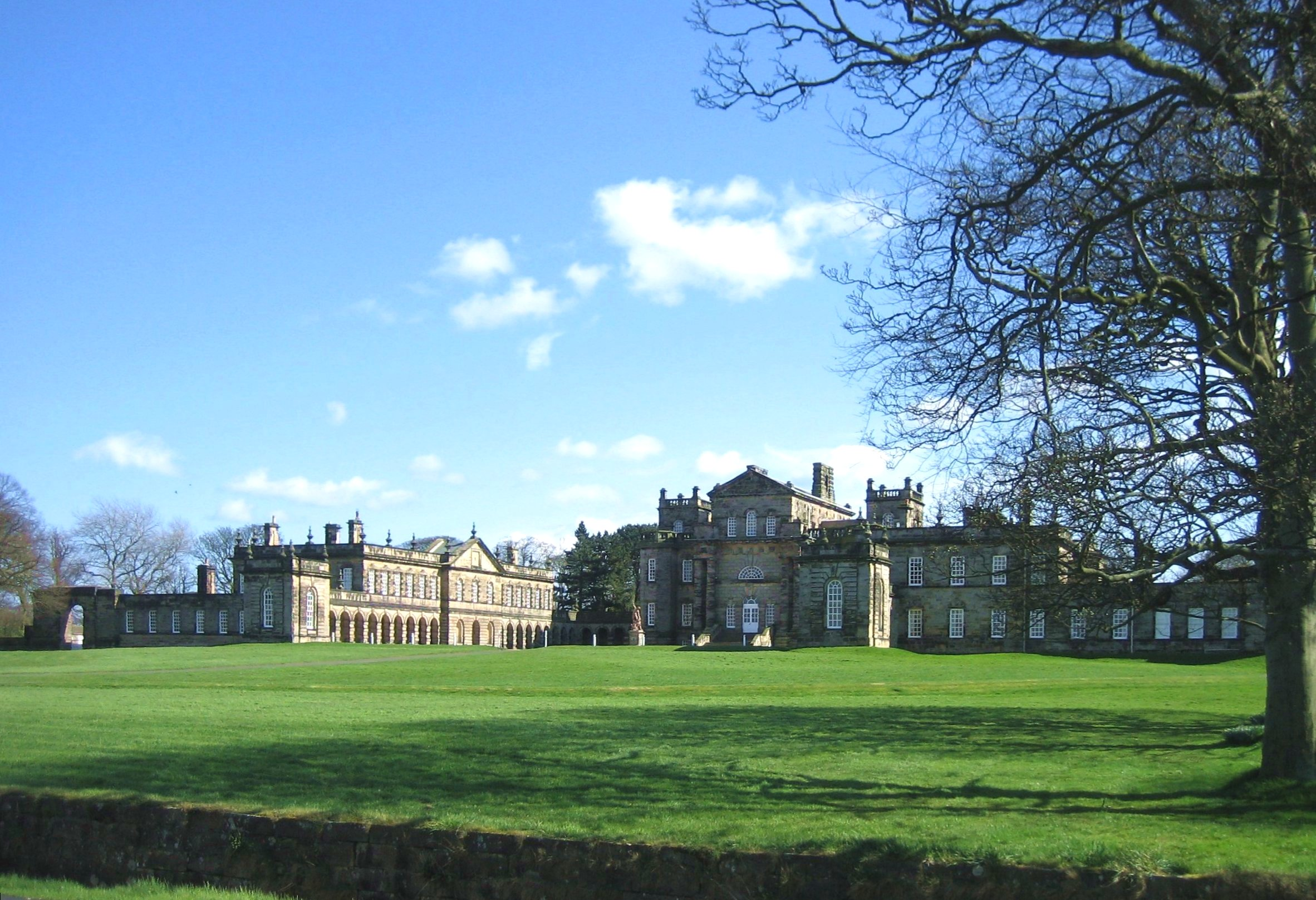
Seaton Delaval Hall, viewed from the north-west

The Delaval name derives from Laval, a town in the valley of the river Mayenne, in the département of Mayenne in old Maine, north-western France. An early ancestor, Guy de la Val I, built a castle there in the first half of the eleventh century. Following the Norman Conquest of England in 1066, the de la Vals settled in Northumberland. At Seaton they built a small fortified dwelling near the existing Saxon church, which in 1100 Hubert de la Val rebuilt, bringing into being the present Church of Our Lady near Delaval Hall.

It would appear that the initial fortified dwelling evolved into the mediaeval Seaton Tower, probably in the fourteenth century. This was extended in Tudor and Jacobean times to form a rambling manor house of considerable size. In the earlier eighteenth century, this was replaced by the present Seaton Delaval Hall (referred to locally as Delaval Hall), the third and last great mansion designed by architect and playwright Sir John Vanbrugh. This was devastated by a fire in 1822 but later restored – apart from the interior of the main block.

The Delaval surname died out on at least two occasions in the Middle Ages, but was re-adopted by lords of Seaton presumably because of the prestige attached to its Norman-French sound. The Delaval family played a prominent part in the life of the county of Northumberland; several served as High Sheriff of the county, others became Members of Parliament and some served as Border Commissioner (the northern edge of the county lies along the Anglo-Scottish border).

The fortunes of the Delavals of Seaton rose to their peak in the eighteenth century. However, with the death of Edward Hussey Delaval in 1814, the Delaval line died out, and the manor of Seaton Delaval and other estates passed to the Astley family of Melton Constable.

Edward Astley, 22nd Baron Hastings, a considerable landowner, spent many years restoring the Hall, before it became his permanent home until his death in 2007. His son and heir, Delaval Astley, 23rd Baron Hastings, faced with high death duties, sold the Hall to the National Trust.

== Eighteenth-century Delavals ==
The eighteenth-century Delavals of Seaton were:

- Admiral George Delaval (1660–1723)
- Captain Francis Blake Delaval (1692–1752)
- Sir Francis Blake Delaval (1727–1771)
- Lord John Hussey Delaval (1728–1808)
- Edward Hussey Delaval (1729–1814)

Lady Rhoda Delaval Astley, the daughter of Captain Francis Blake Delaval and sister of Sir Francis Blake Delaval, was an artist who painted Delaval family members. Many of the paintings are in the National Trust and located at Seaton Delaval Hall, which descended into the Astley line through her son Jacob.

== See also ==
- Baron Delaval
- Delaval baronets
- Admiral Sir Ralph Delaval (c.1641–c.1707)
- Frances de la Tour
