= John Delaval, 1st Baron Delaval =

English landowner and politician (1728–1808)

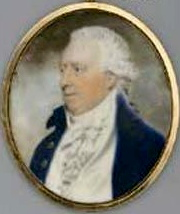
Lord Delaval, miniature by John Downman

John Hussey Delaval, 1st Baron Delaval (17 March 1728 – 17 May 1808), known as Sir John Delaval, Bt, between 1761 and 1783, was an English landowner and politician.

== Background and education ==
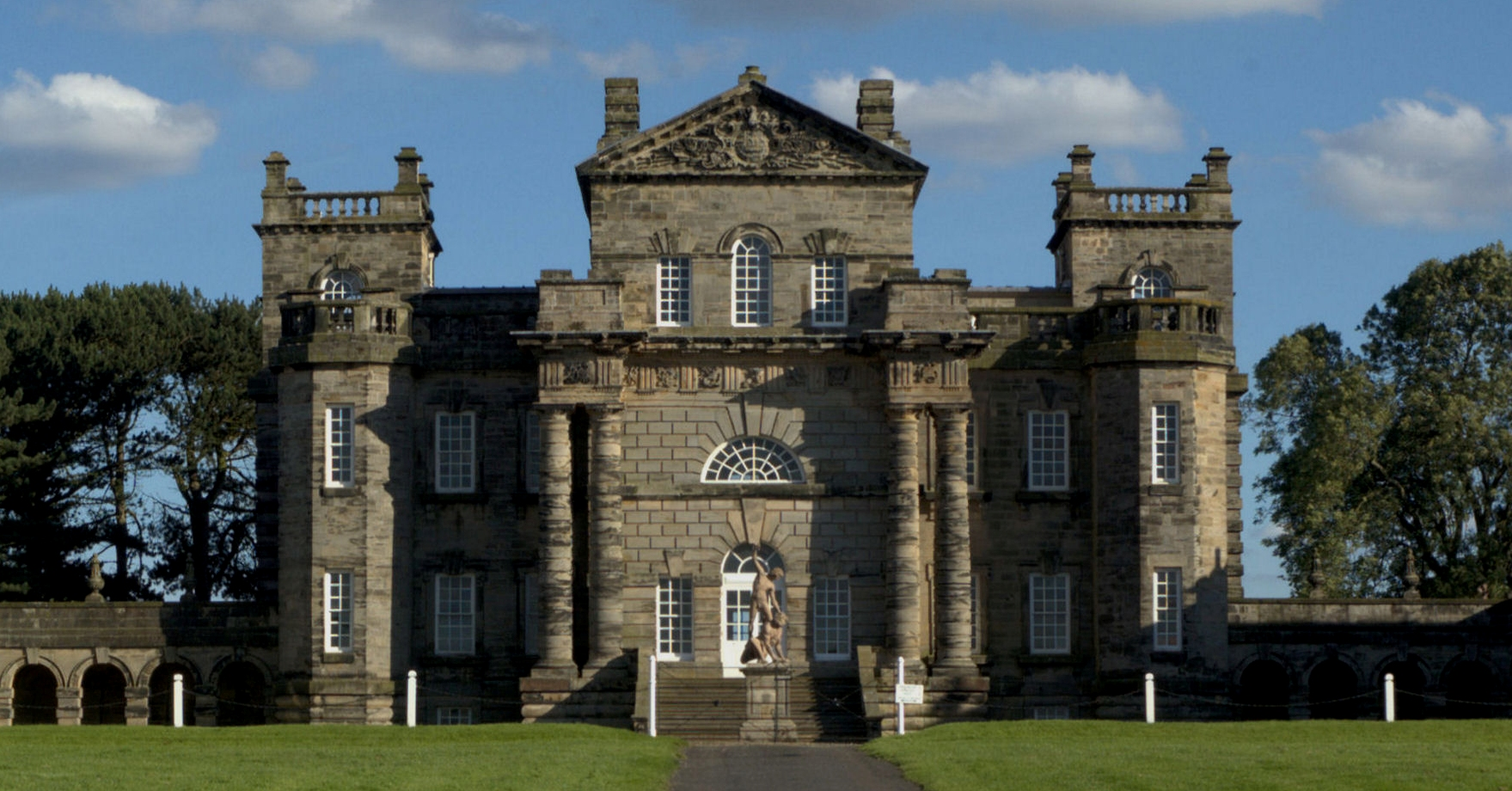
Seaton Delaval Hall, Northumberland

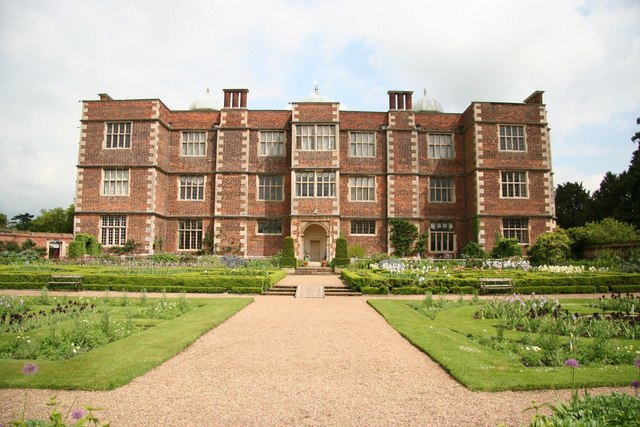
Doddington Hall, Lincolnshire

Delaval was the son of Francis Blake Delaval, who inherited estates at Ford Castle, Northumberland from his mother Mary, née Blake, and at Seaton Delaval, Northumberland from his uncle Admiral George Delaval (1660–1723). John's mother was Rhoda Apreece, through whom John inherited Doddington Hall, Lincolnshire. He was educated at Westminster School and Pembroke College, Cambridge. Delaval bought his father's estates from his elder brother Sir Francis Blake Delaval (1727–1771) in exchange for an annuity, and developed the farming resources at Ford and the coal and mineral resources at Seaton.

His sister was Rhoda Delaval, an artist and wife of Edward Astley.

== Political career ==
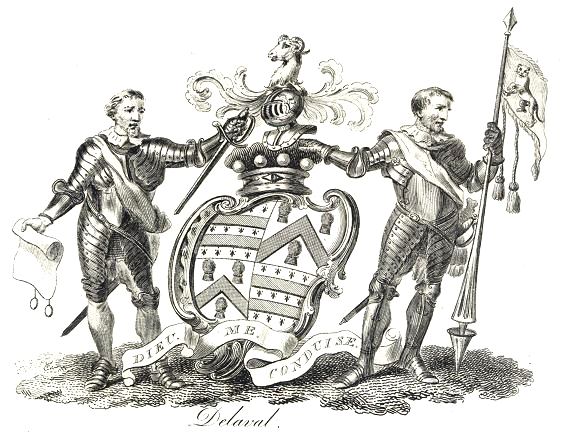
Coat of arms of Lord Delaval

Delaval served as Member of Parliament for Berwick on Tweed 1754–1761, 1765–1774 and 1780–1786. He was created a baronet, of Seaton Delaval in the County of Northumberland, in the Baronetage of Great Britain on 1 July 1761, and on 17 October 1783 he was raised to the Peerage of Ireland as Baron Delaval, of Redford in the County of Wicklow. In 1786 he was further honoured when he was made Baron Delaval, of Seaton Delaval in the County of Northumberland, in the Peerage of Great Britain.

== Personal life ==
Lord Delaval by William Bell, 1774.

Delaval's seat was at Seaton Delaval Hall, an 18th-century masterpiece by Sir John Vanbrugh. Lord Delaval gave artist William Bell his patronage, in return for a series of portraits painted of him and his family, and two views of Seaton Delaval Hall.

Delaval married twice but his only son predeceased him aged just 19, and the baronetcy and baronies became extinct on his death in 1808. He was buried in St Paul's Chapel, Westminster Abbey.

He left his second wife Susannah Elizabeth a life interest in the Ford estate, and bequeathed his estates of Seaton Delaval and Doddington to his brother Edward Hussey Delaval (1729-1814). On the death of Edward in 1814, Doddington passed to Edward's wife and then to his daughter Sarah. Seaton Delaval passed to Jacob, the son of his deceased sister Rhoda, who had been married to Sir Edward Astley of Melton Constable in Norfolk.

Parliament of Great Britain
| Preceded by Thomas Watson; Viscount Barrington | Member of Parliament for Berwick-upon-Tweed; 1754–1761; With: Thomas Watson | Succeeded by Thomas Watson; John Craufurd |
| Preceded by Thomas Watson; John Craufurd | Member of Parliament for Berwick-upon-Tweed; January 1765–1774; With: Thomas Watson to December 1765; Wilmot Vaughan December 1765–1768; Robert Paris Taylor 1768–1774 | Succeeded by Jacob Wilkinson; John Vaughan |
| Preceded by John Vaughan; Jacob Wilkinson | Member of Parliament for Berwick-upon-Tweed; 1780–1786; With: John Vaughan | Succeeded by Sir Gilbert Elliot, Bt; John Vaughan |
Peerage of Ireland
| New creation | Baron Delaval; 1783–1808 | Extinct |
Peerage of Great Britain
| New creation | Baron Delaval; 1786–1808 | Extinct |
Baronetage of Great Britain
| New creation | Baronet (of Ford); 1761–1808 | Extinct |
| Preceded by Hesketh baronets | Delaval baronets of Seaton Delaval; 1 July 1761 | Succeeded by Bayntun-Rolt baronets |
