= Francis Blake Delaval =

Francis Blake Delaval may refer to:

- Francis Blake Delaval (1692–1752), naval officer
- Sir Francis Blake Delaval (1727–1771), his son
