= Ralph Delaval (disambiguation) =

Ralph Delaval was an English naval admiral.

Ralph Delaval may also refer to:

- Sir Ralph Delaval, 1st Baronet (1622–1691)
- Sir Ralph Delaval, 2nd Baronet (1649–1696), of the Delaval baronets

== See also ==
- Delaval (surname)
