= John Craufurd (British Army officer) =

John Craufurd (c. 1725–1764 ) was a British Army officer and politician who sat in the House of Commons between 1761 and 1764.

== Early life ==
Craufurd was the seventh son of Patrick Craufurd of Drumsoy. He joined the army as an ensign in the 13th Foot in 1738. He became captain in 1743, major in 1747 and lieutenant-colonel in 1749 serving under General Pulteney.

== Military career ==
In 1759 Craufurd was chosen to be colonel of the 85th Regiment of Foot raised by Lord Bath, for Lord Pulteney the son of General Pulteney. He was colonel of the regiment from 1759 to 1763. In 1759, he undertook a recruiting tour for the regiment in the North of England. He reported on the progress of the tour setting out for York "where I shall meet Lord Northumberland, and some others who are zealous to serve the infant corps. From thence I shall go to Newcastle, where I have some friends, and will carry with me proper recommendations to Sir Walter Blackett, Mr. Ridley and others". He became brigadier-general in 1760 and took part in the capture of Belle Île in March 1761. From 1762 to 1763 he was serving in Portugal. He became colonel of the 3rd Foot in 1763.

== Parliamentary career ==
Craufurd appeared to use the northern recruiting tour in 1759 for another purpose – the furtherance of his parliamentary ambitions. John Calcraft, regimental agent to the 85th Foot, wrote to Craufurd in September “I do mightily approve your Newcastle scheme as well as your Berwick intentions, and think with you secrecy is necessary there at present as to election intentions, though I would do all I could consistent therewith and avoiding for the present public declaration” Later, Craufurd by invitation from the mayor, burgesses and a majority of freemen secured his election for Berwick-upon-Tweed and declared himself a candidate. He was returned unopposed as Member of Parliament for Berwick at the 1761 general election. His military and other responsibilities may have kept him away from Parliament as it was said “Craufurd has never spoke in the House though often threatened the attempt.”.

== Later life ==
Craufurd also became Lt-governor of Berwick in April 1764 apparently “till Guise (the governor) dies”. He was a stopgap after the death of John Barrington but in the event was outlived by Guise. He also became Lt-Governor of Menorca in June 1764. He died unmarried at Menorca on 2 August 1764.

== Sources ==
Parliament of Great Britain
Preceded by Thomas Watson; John Delaval	Member of Parliament for Berwick-upon-Tweed; 1761–1764; With: Thomas Watson	Succeeded by Thomas Watson; Sir John Delaval, Bt
