= Robert Paris Taylor =

Robert Paris Taylor (c 1741–1792) was a British administrator and politician who sat in the House of Commons from 1768 to 1774.

Taylor was the son of Peter Taylor of Burcott, Somerset and his wife Jane Holt. Through his father's connections, he was appointed to a position in the paymaster's office and in 1759 became Deputy Paymaster in Germany. He returned with a large fortune.

In 1765 Taylor was recommended as a candidate for Ilchester because he could sustain the expense, but he did not get the seat. He was High Sheriff of Somerset in 1765–6. At the 1768 general election he was returned unopposed as Member of Parliament for Berwick-upon-Tweed. He did not stand in 1774.

Taylor succeeded his father in 1777 but by then he appears to have been in serious financial difficulties. He was embroiled in litigation with the trustees of Lord Holland's estate over the accounts of the paymaster's office. He was imprisoned for debt in Fleet prison where he passed the last twelve years of his life. He died 7 Aug. 1792.

Parliament of Great Britain
Preceded by Sir John Delaval, Bt; Wilmot Vaughan	Member of Parliament for Berwick-upon-Tweed; 1768–1774; With: Sir John Delaval, Bt	Succeeded by Jacob Wilkinson; Hon. John Vaughan
