= Thomas Watson (Berwick-upon-Tweed MP) =

Thomas Watson (ca. 1701 – 7 January 1766) of Grindon Bridge, Northumberland, was an English politician who sat in the House of Commons from 1740 to 1765.

Watson was the son of Thomas Watson of Berwick and his wife Margaret Clerk. He married Barbara Forster. He was an influential member of the corporation of Berwick and was Mayor of Berwick in 1727, 1729, 1732, 1734, 1736 and 1739. In 1732 he was appointed commissary of musters in south Britain.

Watson was returned as Member of Parliament (MP) for Berwick-upon-Tweed at a by-election on 27 November 1740. He voted regularly with the Government and in 1741 was appointed deputy commissary for Danish and Hessian troops in British pay. He was returned again in 1741 and 1747.

Watson was returned unopposed as MP for Berwick at the 1754 British general election. In March 1754 he is shown in a list of secret service pensions as receiving one of £500 a year. This pension lapsed when Newcastle, who awarded it, left office and Watson spent years trying to recover it. At the 1761 British general election, Watson was returned unopposed again. He vacated his seat in December 1765.

Watson died without issue on 7 January 1766.

Parliament of Great Britain
Preceded by Viscount Barrington; George Liddell	Member of Parliament for Berwick-upon-Tweed; 1740 – 1765; With: Viscount Barrington to 1754; John Delaval 1754–61; John Craufurd 1761–65; Sir John Delaval, Bt from January 1765	Succeeded by Sir John Delaval, Bt; Viscount Lisburne
