= John Vaughan (British Army officer, died 1795) =

British Army officer and politician (1731–1795

Lieutenant-General The Honourable Sir John Vaughan KB
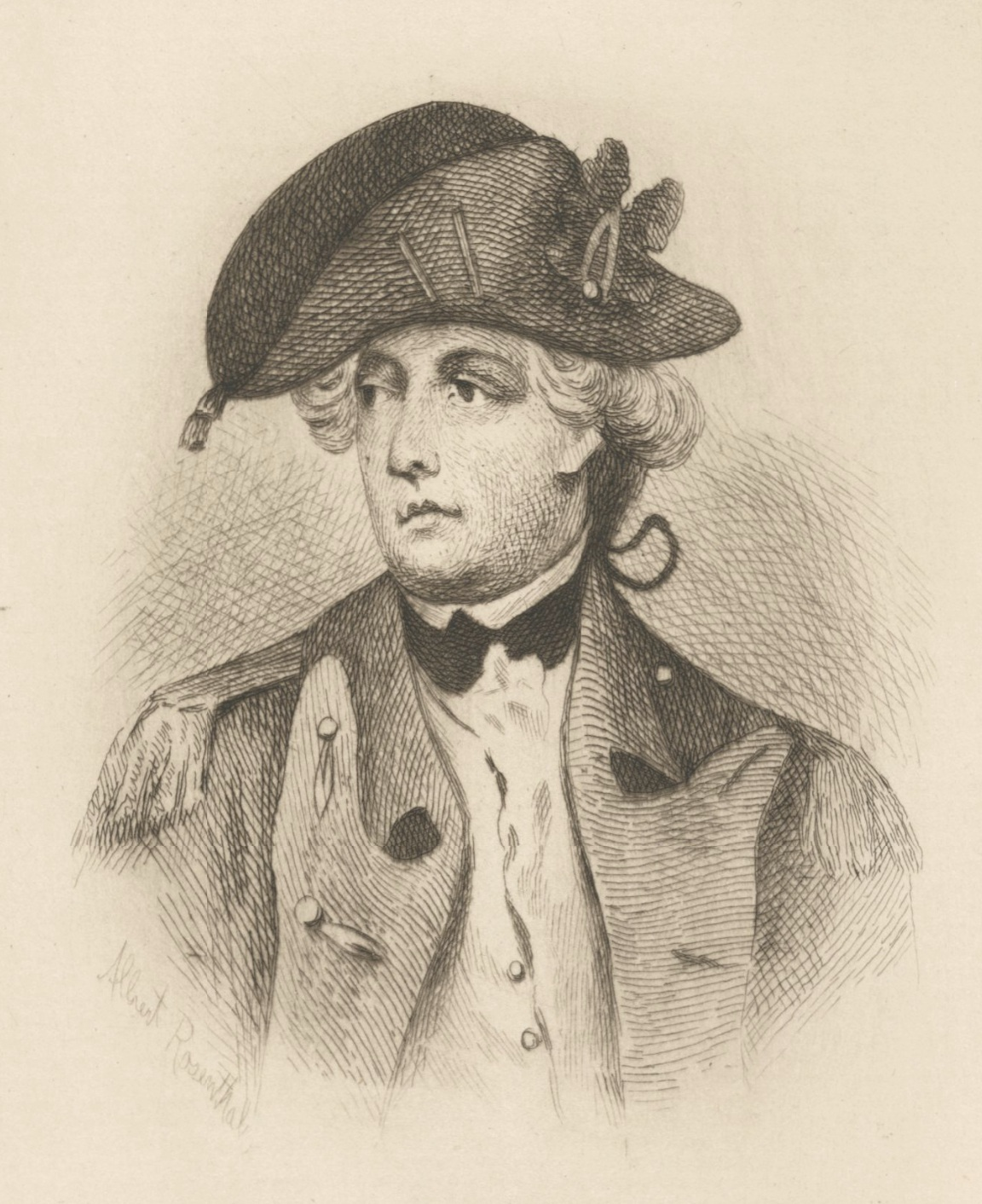
- Portrait by Albert Rosenthal, 1890

Member of Parliament for Berwick-upon-Tweed
- In office 1774–1795

Member of Parliament for St Johnstown
- In office 1776–1783

Personal details
- Born: c.1731
- Died: 30 June 1795 Martinique, French West Indies
- Resting place: Mamhead, Devon
- Party: Whig
- Parents: Wilmot Vaughan, 3rd Viscount Lisburne (father); Elizabeth Watson (mother)
- Occupation: Soldier and politician

Military service
- Allegiance: Great Britain
- Branch/service: British Army
- Years of service: 1748–1795
- Rank: Lieutenant-general
- Unit: 10th Regiment of Dragoons
- Commands: 94th Regiment of Foot; 16th Regiment of Foot; 46th Regiment of Foot; Leeward Islands; Windward Islands
- Battles/wars: Seven Years' War; Invasion of Martinique (1762); American War of Independence; New York and New Jersey campaign; Battle of Long Island; Battle of Fort Washington; Battle of White Plains; Philadelphia campaign; Battle of Short Hills; Saratoga campaign; Battle of Forts Clinton and Montgomery; Burning of Kingston; Northern theater of the American Revolutionary War after Saratoga; Second Hudson River expedition; Fourth Anglo-Dutch War; Capture of Sint Eustatius; French Revolutionary Wars; West Indies Campaign

Lieutenant-General Sir John Vaughan KB MP (c. 1731 – 30 June 1795) was a British Army officer and politician. During the American War of Independence he served in both North America and the West Indies.

== Early life ==
Vaughan was the second son of the 3rd Viscount Lisburne. He began his military career as an officer in the 9th Regiment of Marines, being commissioned as a second lieutenant in 1746; he transferred to the 10th Regiment of Dragoons as a cornet in 1748, and was promoted to lieutenant in 1751, captain-lieutenant in 1754, and major in 1759.

In 1760, he became a lieutenant colonel in the 94th Regiment of Foot, and he held the same rank in the 16th Regiment of Foot from 1762. He served in both Germany and North America during the Seven Years' War, leading a division of grenadiers with distinction at the capture of Martinique. In 1772, he was promoted to colonel, and from 1775 until his death he served as colonel of the 46th Regiment of Foot.

== Member of Parliament ==
Vaughan entered the British Parliament in 1774 as member for Berwick-upon-Tweed, holding the seat for the remaining twenty years of his life. From 1776 to 1783, he was also a member of the Irish Parliament. There he represented St Johnstown (County Longford). He was appointed Governor of Fort William in 1779 and then, in 1780, as Governor of Berwick, also holding this post until his death, although it did not interfere with his active military career.

Vaughan was a reliable supporter of the government when in the House of Commons of Great Britain, until the end of the American War of Independence. At the 1780 election the government's election managers considered trying to replace him temporarily as Berwick's MP by someone who would be able to attend and vote, but the borough's patrons would have none of it and he was returned unopposed.

== American War of Independence ==
Following the outbreak of the American War of Independence, Vaughan by now at the rank of major general, returned to North America, serving from 1776 until 1779. He led grenadiers at the Battle of Long Island and was wounded in the thigh. Vaughan commanded a column at the Battle of Short Hills in July 1777, and also commanded a column during the Battle of Forts Clinton and Montgomery, where his horse was killed under him. In 1779, he returned to England and was immediately appointed Commander-in-Chief in the Leeward Islands.

== Fourth Anglo-Dutch War ==
Vaughan served in the West Indies from 1779 until 1782, taking a leading part in Rodney's Capture of St Eustatius in 1781, a successful campaign aimed at neutralizing the Dutch port used to store and ship supplies to the American colonists during their Revolutionary War.

Later in the year he was accused of embezzling the property confiscated at Sint Eustatius, and was forced to defend himself against Edmund Burke's attack in Parliament, stating that he had not profited by a shilling and had always acted in the national interest. He was promoted to lieutenant-general in 1782.

== Later life ==
In 1792, he was appointed a Knight of the Bath (KB). In 1795, he was again assigned to command in the Leeward Islands, but died later that year at Martinique. Just before Vaughan’s death he sanctioned the first iterations of the West India Regiments, founded using hired slave soldiers.

== Sources ==
- Jameson, J. Franklin (July 1903). "St. Eustatius in the American Revolution". The American Historical Review. 8 (4). Oxford University Press on behalf of the American Historical Association: 683–708. doi:10.2307/1834346. JSTOR 1834346.
- Robert Beatson, A Chronological Register of Both Houses of Parliament (London: Longman, Hurst, Res & Orme, 1807)

Parliament of Great Britain
Preceded by Sir John Delaval; Robert Paris Taylor	Member of Parliament for Berwick-upon-Tweed; 1774–1795; With: Jacob Wilkinson 1774–1780; Sir John Delaval 1780–1786; Sir Gilbert Elliot 1786–1790; Captain Charles Carpenter 1790–1795	Succeeded by Captain Charles Carpenter; John Callender
Parliament of Ireland
Preceded by Ralph Fetherston; Robert Jephson	Member of Parliament for St Johnstown (County Longford); 1776–1783; With: Sir Ralph Fetherston, 1st Bt 1776–1780; Sackville Hamilton 1780–1783	Succeeded by Sir Thomas Fetherston, 2nd Bt; Nicholas Colthurst
Military offices
Preceded by Hon. William Howe	Colonel of the 46th Foot; 1775–1795	Succeeded by Sir James Craig
Preceded by John Burgoyne	Governor of Fort William; 1779–1780	Succeeded by James Murray
Preceded by Sir John Mordaunt	Governor of Berwick-upon-Tweed; 1780–1795	Succeeded by The Viscount Howe
