= 85th Regiment of Foot (Royal Volunteers) =

- Active: 1759–1763
- Country: Kingdom of Great Britain (1707–1800)
- Branch: British Army
- Type: Infantry

Commanders
- Colonel of the Regiment: Col. John Craufurd

The 85th Regiment of Foot (Royal Volunteers) was a short-lived British Army regiment during the Seven Years' War. It was recruited at Shrewsbury in 1759 as the first full regiment of light infantry in the British Army and originally intended for service in the North American campaign of the war (French and Indian War). The unit was raised in 1759 by William Pulteney, 1st Earl of Bath. His son William Pulteney, Viscount Pulteney served as the unit's lieutenant-colonel from its foundation until his 1763 death by a fever in Madrid.

== Combat history ==
The unit took part in the Capture of Belle Île in February 1761, before being sent to Portugal in 1762. The regiment returned home to be disbanded the following year after the Treaty of Paris (1763) as part of a general demobilisation.

== Colonel ==
The Colonel of the Regiment throughout its life was Colonel John Craufurd, who was afterwards made Colonel of the Buffs (Royal East Kent Regiment).
