= Jacob Wilkinson =

English businessman and MP

Jacob Wilkinson (c. 1722–1799) was an English businessman who served as an MP and as a director of the East India Company.

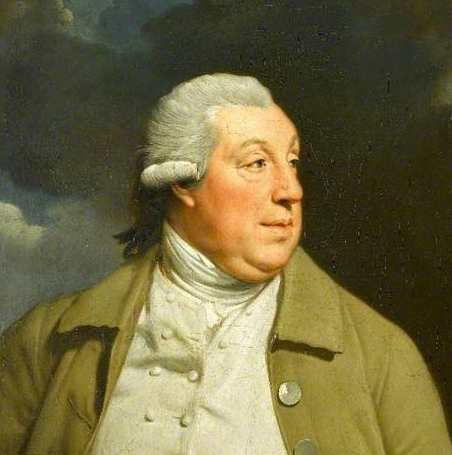
Jacob Wilkinson, MP

== Career ==
According to Sir Lewis Namier, he was a Presbyterian from Berwick-upon-Tweed who became rich as a businessman and banker in London. By 1757 he was appearing in commercial directories and by 1759 was a substantial investor in government stock.

At some point he also acquired lands and slaves in the West Indies, at his death holding the estate of Hoghole in the parish of St Thomas-in-the-Vale on Jamaica and another estate on Tobago.

He retained links with his birthplace, where in 1765 he was mentioned as a political opponent of Hugh Percy, 1st Duke of Northumberland's supporters and in the general election of 1774 came top of the poll, becoming MP for Berwick-upon-Tweed in the Parliament of Great Britain. He did not stand again in the 1780 general election, but in 1781 won a seat at Honiton.

While sitting, he also sought election as a director of the East India Company, which he achieved in 1782. However, when the government in 1783 proposed greater parliamentary control over the activities of the company, Wilkinson resigned his directorship. He did not stand again in the general election of 1784, so ending his political career.

He died at his home in Bedford Row, Holborn, on 24 June 1799. He was buried at St Mary's churchyard in Watford, Hertfordshire. The inscription reads, "Here lie the Remains of JACOB WILKINSON Esq Late of Grove Mill in this Parish, and an Old and Respectable Merchant of the City of London. He departed this life... on the 24th June 1799, Aged 76 Years..." (History of Hertfordshire, Vol 3 - Cussans, 1881)

== Family ==
With his wife Ann, who survived him, he had ten children between 1761 and 1779. In his will, made on 10 August 1798 and proved on 18 July 1799, he appointed as his executors two of his sons, Thomas Wilkinson (1762-) and Daniel Wier Wilkinson (1778–1800), together with John Bourdieu (1763–1825), husband of his deceased daughter Ann (1766–1798). In addition to generous legacies to all these, he left large sums to his third surviving son Hugh Wilkinson (1779-) and to his three surviving daughters, Mary Ann Wilkinson (1764-), Elizabeth Wilkinson (abt 1768-) and Fanny Wilkinson (1776–1812).

Parliament of Great Britain
Preceded by Sir John Delaval; Robert Paris Taylor	Member of Parliament for Berwick-upon-Tweed; 1774–1780; With: Hon. John Vaughan	Succeeded by Sir John Delaval; Hon. John Vaughan
