= Sir Jacob Astley, 5th Baronet =

British politician (1756–1817)

Sir Jacob Astley Baronet (from 1802)
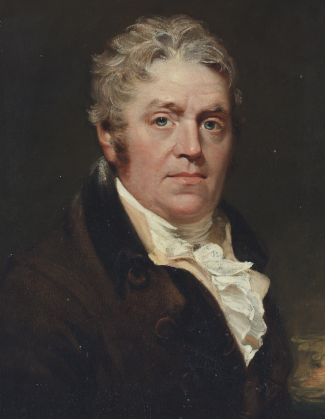
- Astley sometime after 1800 by Benjamin Burnell

Member of Parliament for Norfolk (with Thomas Coke 1797-1807 and 1807-1817) and Edward Coke (1807)
- In office 1797–1817
- Preceded by: Thomas Coke and John Wodehouse, Bt.
- Succeeded by: Thomas Coke and Edmond Wodehouse

Personal details
- Born: 12 September 1756
- Died: 28 April 1817 (aged 60)
- Spouse: Hester Browne
- Children: nine, including Jacob
- Parents: Sir Edward Astley, 4th Baronet (father); Rhoda Delaval (mother)
- Relatives: Edward Hussey Delaval (uncle)
- Education: Westminster School
- Alma mater: Trinity College, Cambridge

Military service
- Allegiance: Great Britain / United Kingdom
- Branch/service: Militia / Fencibles
- Years of service: 1780-1797
- Rank: Lieutenant Colonel
- Unit: Norfolk Foot Militia
- Commands: Norfolk Fencible Cavalry

Lieutenant-colonel Sir Jacob Henry Astley, 5th Baronet (12 September 1756 – 28 April 1817) was an English landowner and Member of Parliament.

== Life ==
He was the third son of Sir Edward Astley, 4th Baronet of Melton Constable and Rhoda Delaval, daughter of Francis Blake Delaval of Seaton Delaval, Northumberland. He attended Westminster School and Trinity College, Cambridge.

On 14 January 1789 he married Hester Browne, by whom he had three sons and six daughters. His father Edward was MP for Norfolk for twenty-two years and gave it up in 1790 rather than contest it. Jacob was given a commission as a captain in the East Norfolk Militia in 1780, which he held until 1794, when he was made lieutenant colonel in the Norfolk Fencible Light Dragoons, a role he held for five years. A brother Edward J.Astley was appointed as a major. He was on military service in Scotland in 1797 when his mother announced his candidature for one of the seats in his father's old constituency, which had fallen vacant when Sir John Wodehouse was made a peer. The constituency's other MP Thomas William Coke offered him financial help and Astley was returned unopposed, despite Wodehouse threatening to refuse his peerage and remain MP to block his election.

Astley professed neutrality and publicly distanced himself from Coke, but he did vote with the Whigs against William Pitt the Younger's assessed taxes and land tax redemption in late 1797 and early 1798, against the refusal to enter into peace negotiations with France in 1800 and for the censure motion by Grey on 25 March 1801. By his father's death in 1802 both his elder brothers had died and so he inherited the baronetcy and Melton Constable Hall in Norfolk. Again assisted by Coke, his re-election campaign of 1802 was fierce and he was attacked as "a liar, a coward, an assassin, a scoundrel, a murderer; and ...[the murderer of] his own father". He initiated a libel case, though the defence cited his own father's words just before his death and Astley was only awarded a fifth of the £10,000 damages he claimed.

When his mother's brother Edward Hussey Delaval died in 1814 he inherited his estate of Seaton Delaval Hall in Northumberland.

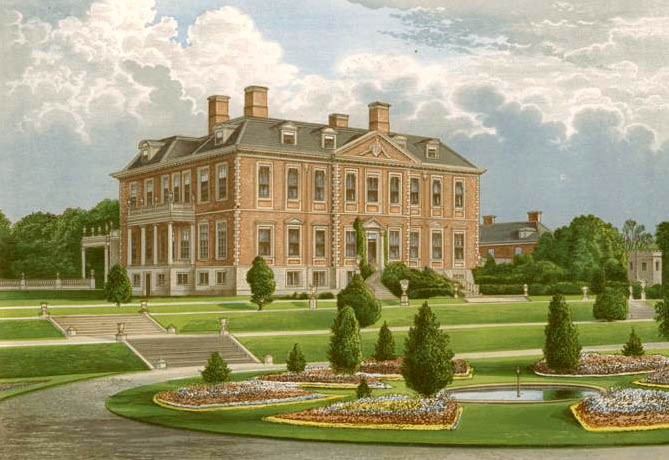
Melton Constable Hall, Norfolk

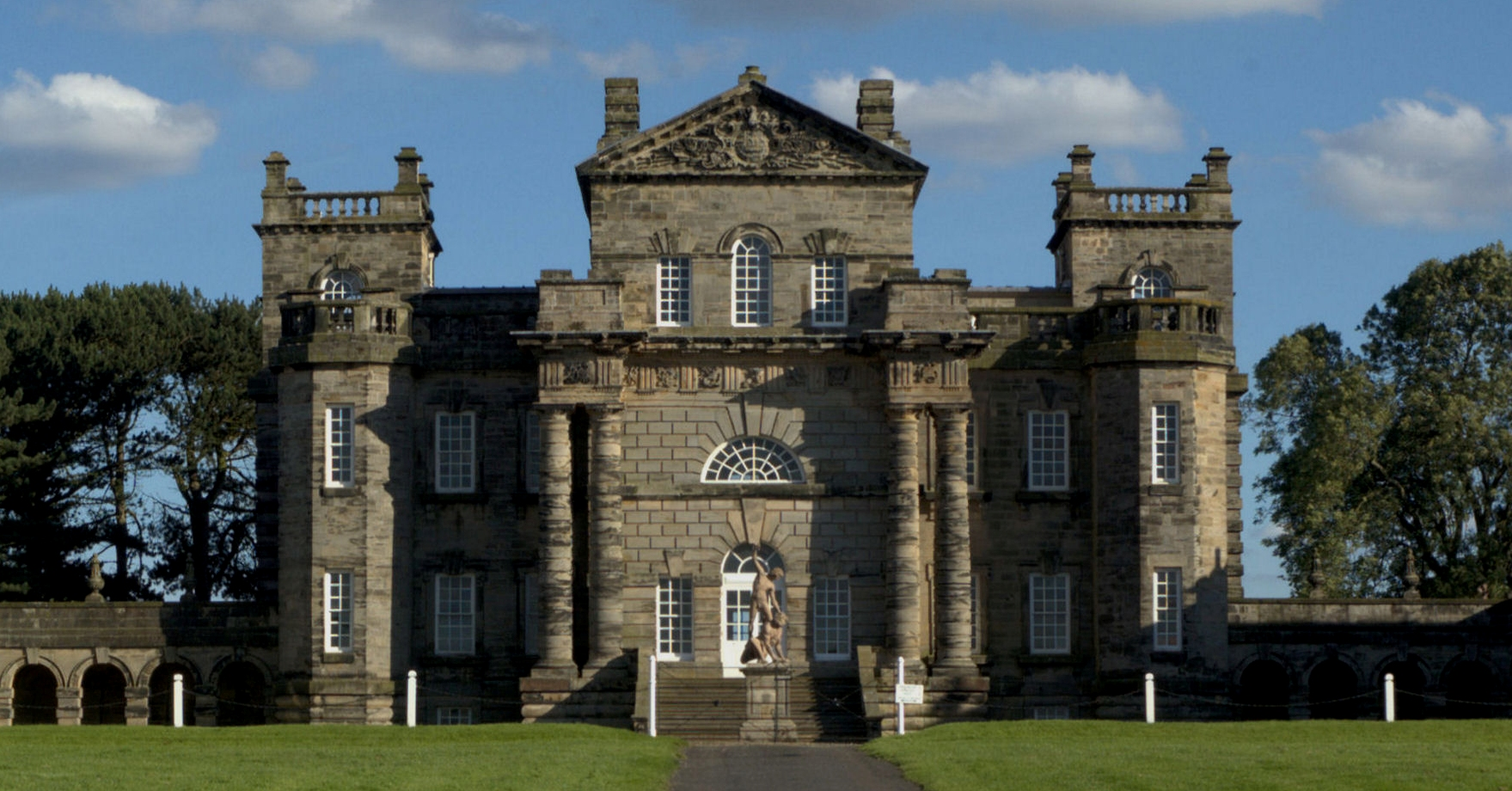
Seaton Delaval Hall, Northumberland

The 1806 election elected Coke and William Windham as the MPs for Norfolk, but on petition this result was declared invalid and in a by-election the following year Coke's younger brother Edward and Astley were elected instead. Astley took leaves of absence in 1815 and 1816 and died in 1817. His eldest son Jacob succeeded him in the baronetcy.

== Issue ==
- Anne (d. 1833), who married Thomas Potter Macqueen, MP for East Looe and Bedfordshire. They had five children.
- Hester (d. 31 Aug 1867), wife of Rev. Augustus Dashwood, son of Sir Henry Watkin Dashwood, 3rd Baronet. They had three children
- Agnes (d. 30 Jul 1872), who married Rev. John Henry Sparke. No known issue.
- Editha (17 June 1793 – 27 March 1871), who married Warden George Sergison, JP for Sussex. They had four children.
- Sir Jacob (13 Nov 1797-27 Dec 1859)
- Edward (Jan 1799-4 Apr 1846). Unmarried.
- Lt.-Col. Francis L'Estrange (27 Feb 1810-9 Apr 1866), first married to Charlotte Micklethwait, granddaughter of John Rous, 1st Earl of Stradbroke. after Charlotte's death he married Rosalind Alicia Frankland, daughter of Sir Robert Frankland-Russell, 7th Baronet. He had three children with each.

Parliament of Great Britain
Preceded by Thomas Coke; Sir John Wodehouse, Bt.	Member of Parliament for Norfolk; 1797–1801; With: Thomas Coke	Succeeded by Parliament of the United Kingdom
Parliament of the United Kingdom
Preceded by Parliament of Great Britain	Member of Parliament for Norfolk; 1801–1817; With: Thomas Coke 1801–07; Edward Coke 1807; Thomas Coke 1807–17	Succeeded by Thomas Coke; Edmond Wodehouse
Baronetage of England
Preceded by Edward Astley	Baronet (of Hill Morton); 1802–1817	Succeeded by Jacob Astley
