= Rhoda Delaval =

British artist (1725–1757)

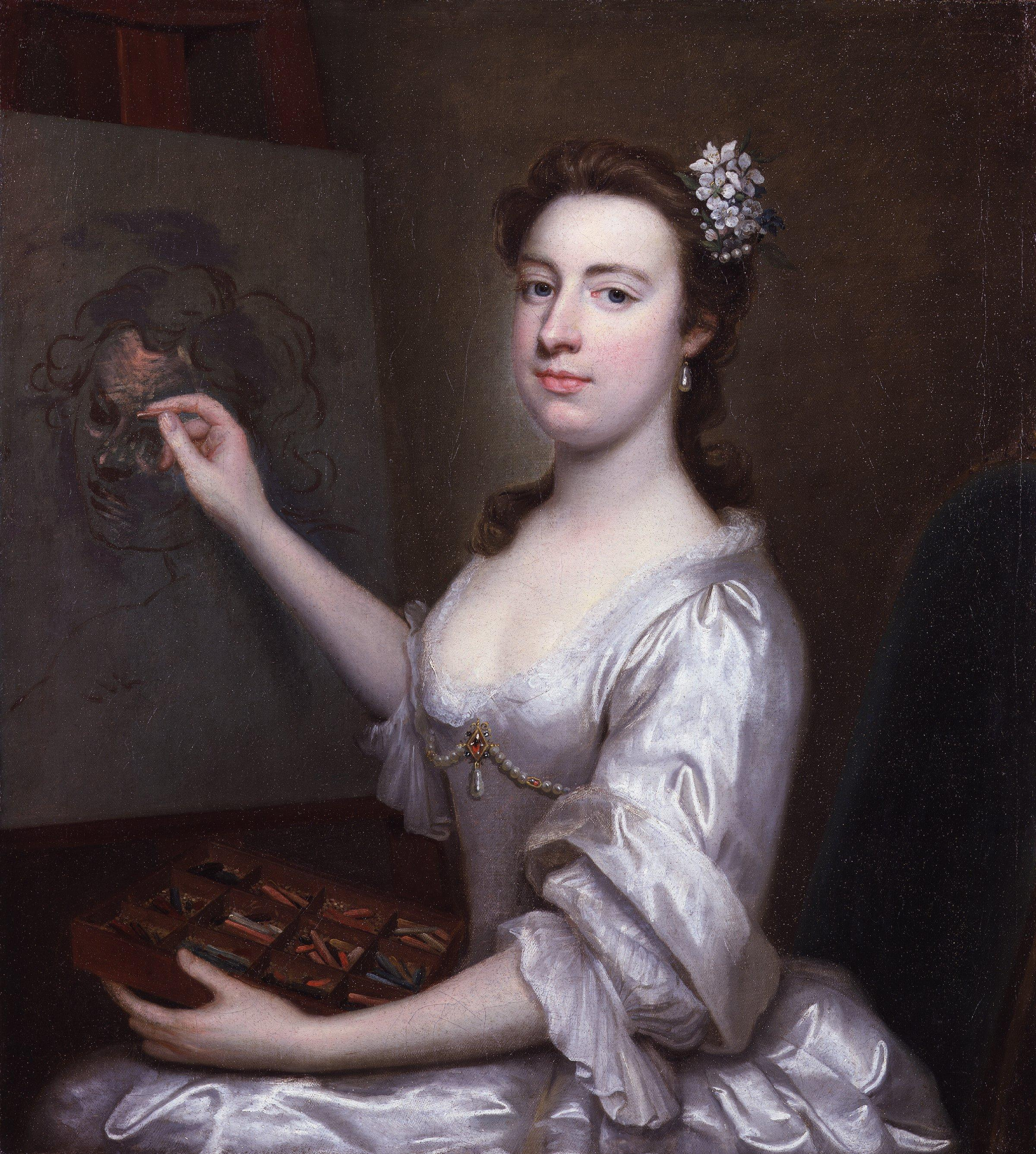
- Arthur Pond's portrait of Delaval
- Born: 1 July 1725; London, England
- Died: 1757 (aged 31–32); London, England
- Resting place: Widcombe, Bath, England
- Education: Via Arthur Pond
- Known for: Portraiture
- Spouse: Edward Astley (m. 1751)
- Children: 4; including Jacob
- Parent(s): Francis Blake Delaval; Rhoda Apreece

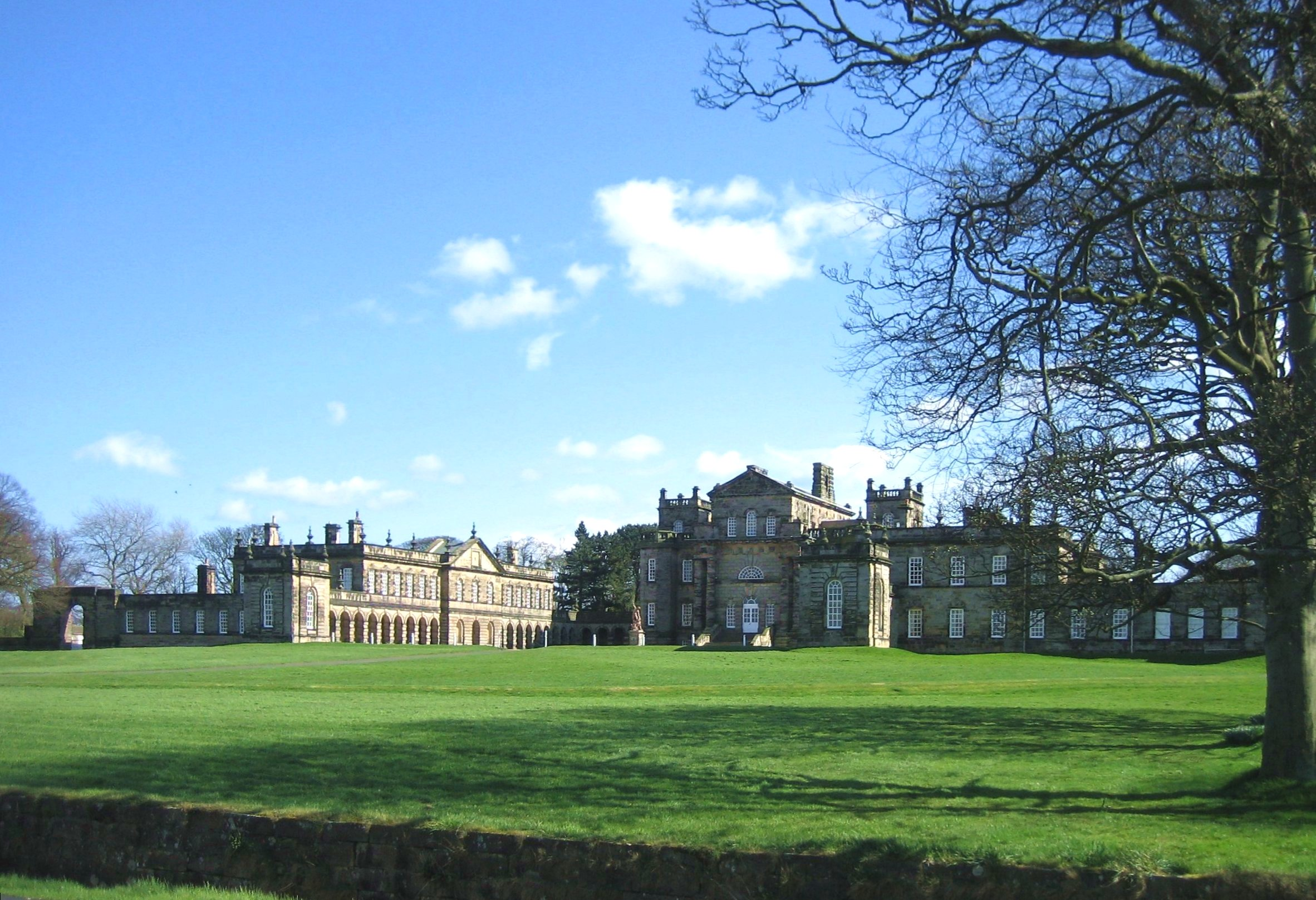
Seaton Delaval Hall, built by the Delavals and the former seat of the Astley family

Rhoda Delaval Astley (1 July 1725 – 1757) was an English aristocrat and artist. She was married to Edward Astley, with whom she had a daughter and three sons. Lady Astley studied painting with Arthur Pond, who painted her portrait. Seaton Delaval Hall passed from the Delaval family to the Astley family through her descendants.

== Early life ==
Rhoda Delaval was born on 1 July 1725 to Captain Francis Blake Delaval (the elder) and Rhoda Apreece and baptized at St George's, Hanover Square in London on 22 July 1725. She was their oldest daughter of 12 children. Her siblings were Anne Hussey, Mary Elizabeth, Sarah, Robert, George, Henry, Ralph, Francis, Edward, Thomas, John. Two years after her birth, her brother, Sir Francis Blake Delaval (the younger) (1727–1771) was born. A brother George, who died as a young adult, also pursued the art of painting with her instructor, Arthur Pond. She was known to be a talented, beautiful woman. One of her sisters was Sarah, Countess of Mexborough.

== Marriage and children ==
On 23 May 1751, she married Edward Astley, who became the 4th Baronet of Melton Constable. They lived at 11 Downing Street when in London. Astley gave birth to four children, one daughter and three sons. Editha Rhoda was born 14 April 1755 and died by 12 May, when she was brought to be buried. Edward was born and died by 1757 and Francis was born in 1757. Jacob Henry was born 12 September 1756.

She died in 1757 following the birth of Francis and was buried 21 October 1757 at Widcombe, Bath with her son Edward and daughter Edith Rhoda at a church near the manor.

Edward Astley lived at Melton Constable with his children after her death. Her letters, before and after her marriage, describe the personal daily lives of the people she knew in Northumberland. As the result of Edward and Rhoda's marriage, Seaton Delaval Hall came into the Astley family in 1814 through Jacob, when none of her brothers produced a male heir.

== Artist ==
Periodically between 1744 and 1750, Astley studied art under Arthur Pond, who also painted her portrait. She purchased prints for about £1,500 (equivalent to £287,554 in 2025) from Pond.

The National Portrait Gallery has the painting of her drawing with pastels. Her painting of Sir Jacob Astley, 1st Baron Astley of Reading was made from a 17th-century original painting. She made a painting of herself and her brother entitled Painting and Poetry, patterned after Bernardino Luini. The painting of Anne Hussey Delaval (1737–1812), Lady Stanhope in the National Trust is attributed to Rhoda Delaval and is loan by Lord Hastings. Lady Anne Delaval Stanhope was Astley's sister. She had been commissioned, for a total of about £300 (equivalent to £57,511 in 2025), to paint portraits of her sisters and brothers.

Seaton Delaval, Northumberland, National Trust

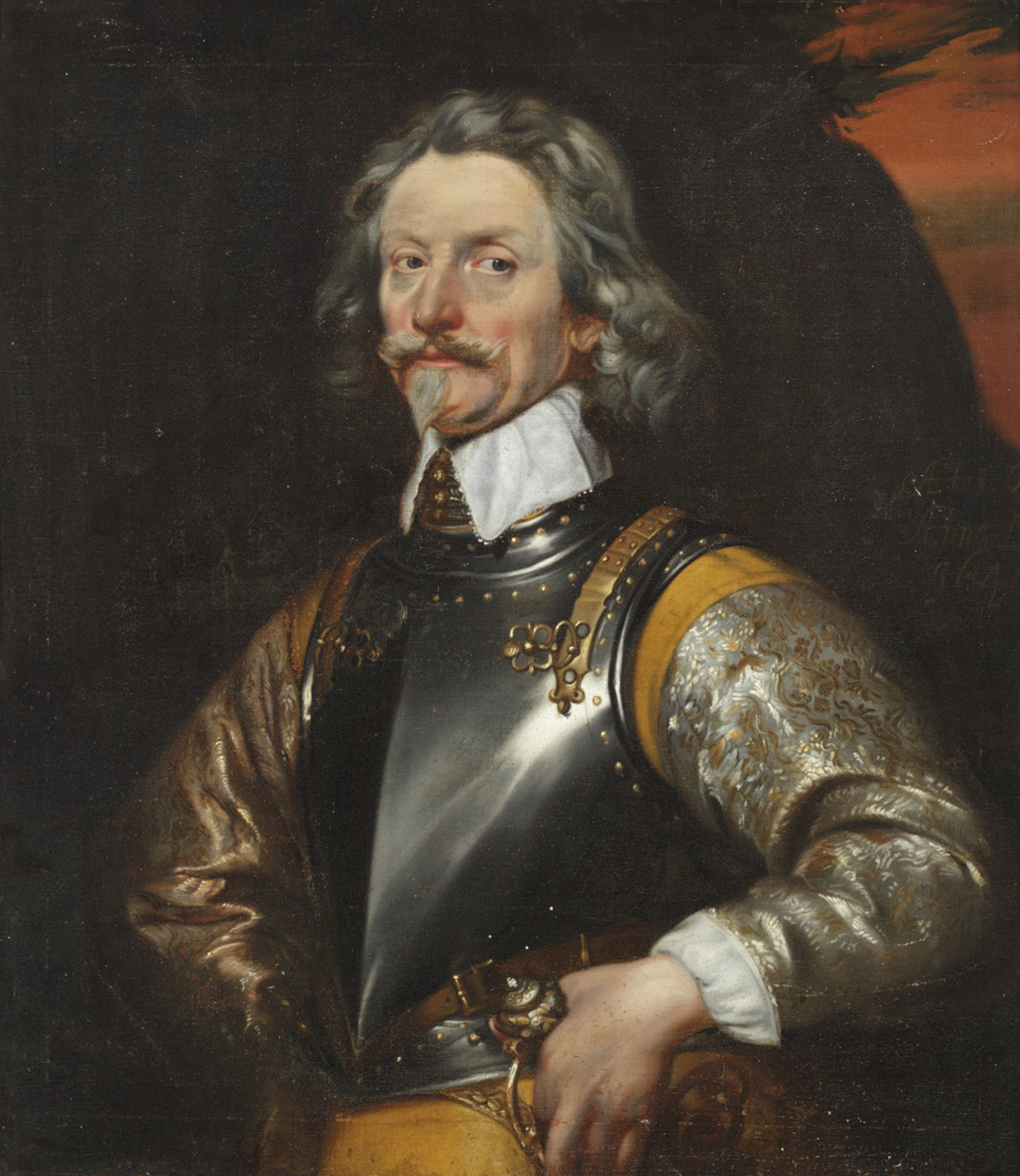
Sir Jacob Astley (1579–1651/1652), 1st Baron Astley of Reading

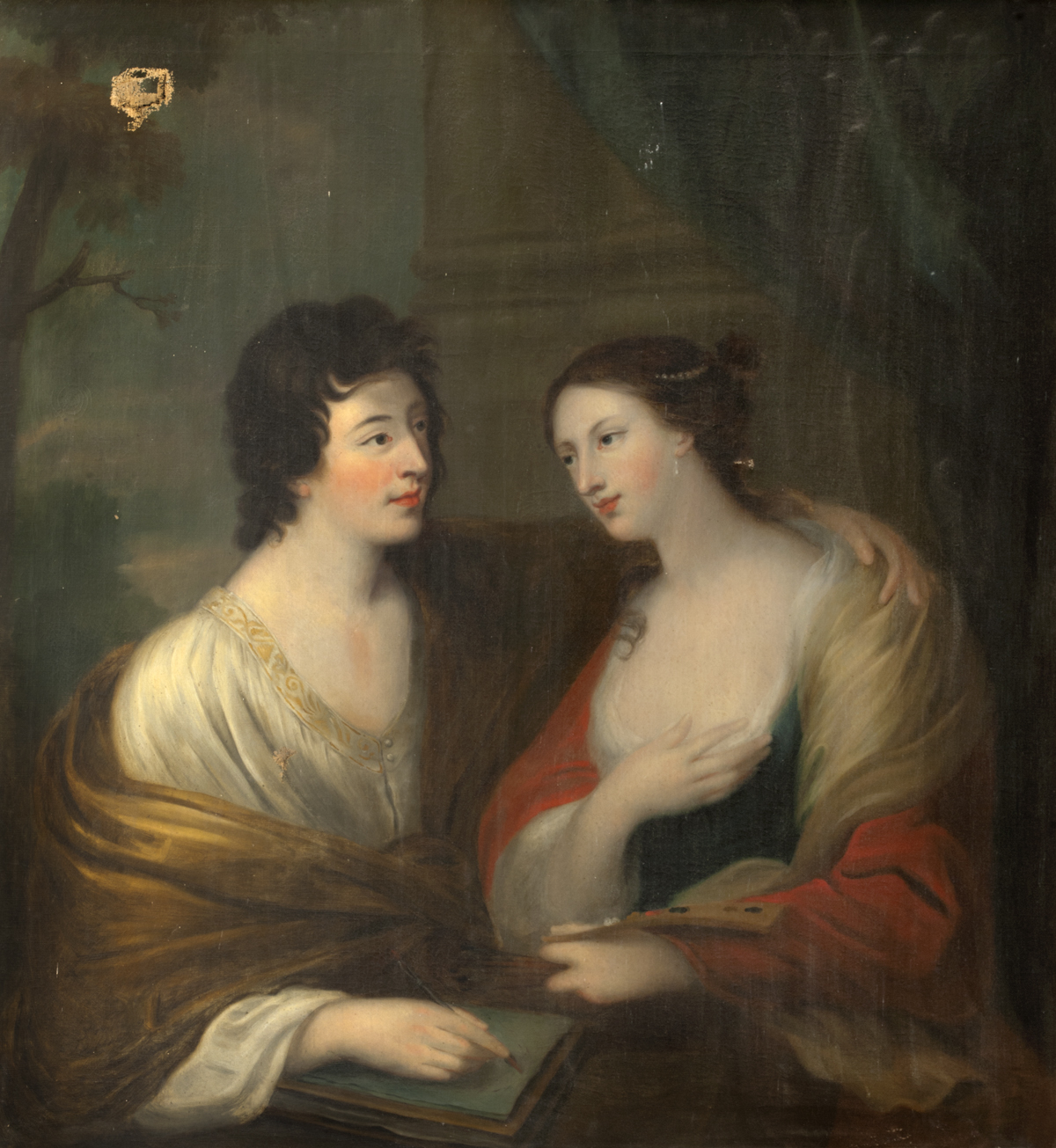
Rhoda Delaval (1725–1757), Later Lady Astley, and Her Brother, Sir Francis Blake Delaval (1727–1771)

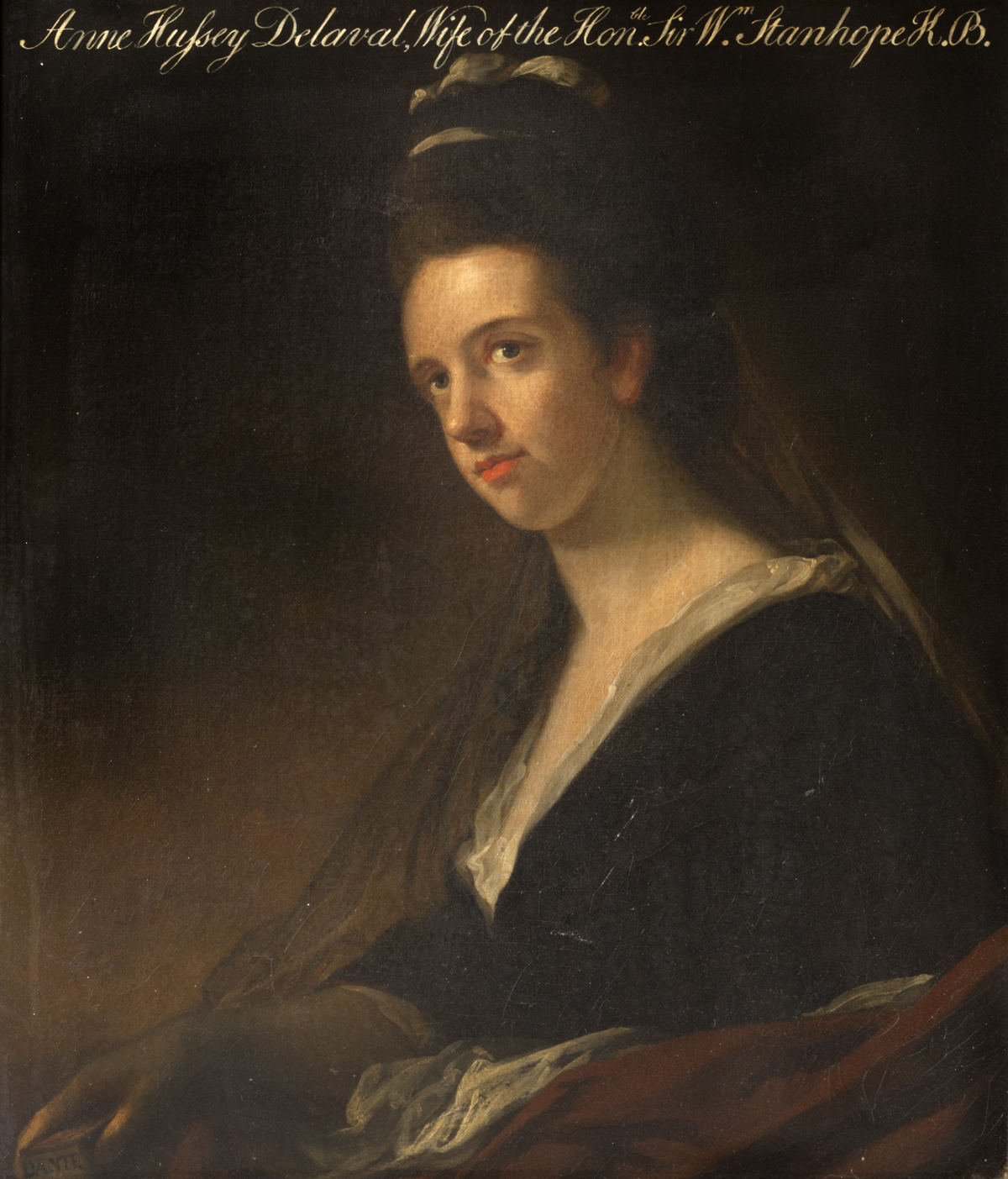
Anne Hussey Delaval (1737–1812), Lady Stanhope

James MacArdell made an engraving of her self-portrait. In 1756, her portrait was painted by Joshua Reynolds and the painting was at Ford Castle in north Northumberland in 1897. Another painting of her is in Doddington Hall, Lincolnshire.
