= Ann Catley =

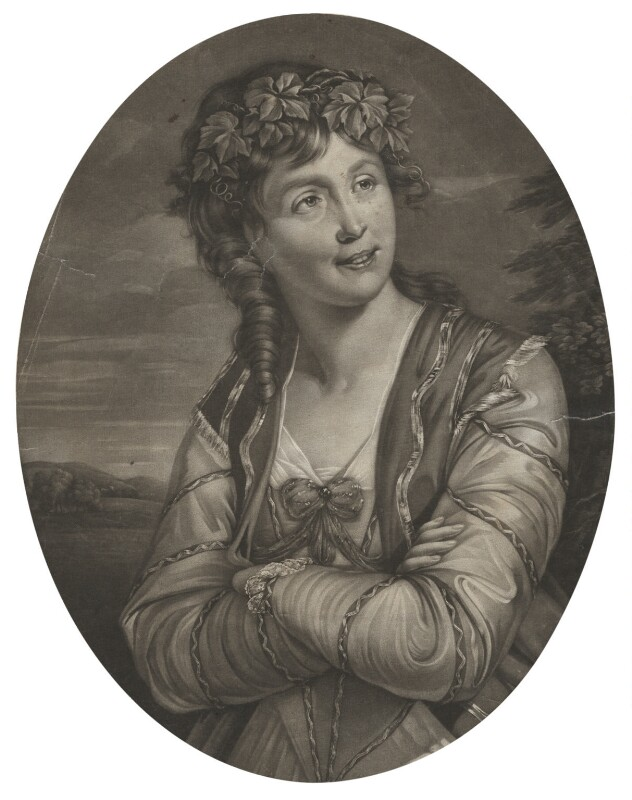
- as Euphrosyne in Milton's 'Comus' published in 1777

Background information
- Also known as: Ann Lascelles
- Born: 1745; Tower Hill, England
- Died: 14 October 1789 (aged 43–44) Ealing, Middlesex, England

Ann Catley (1745 – 14 October 1789), also known as Ann Lascelles, was an English singer, actress, and prostitute.

== Personal life ==
Catley was born near Tower Hill, London, to hackney coachman and a washer woman. Mr. Catley spent his earnings only on himself, often taking his wife's wages as well. Ann helped her mother as a laundress. At the age of ten, she became acquainted with Colonel Lascelles, known for his relation to the Prince of Wales. He found she could sing and she began performing for the neighborhood, at a young age, she was known for her angelic voice and looks, garnering multiple admirers. She first made her money singing in pubs and to the garrison of the Tower of London. It was not known if Ann lost her virginity to any of the “numerous corp admirers who daily laid siege to her” but it was “certain that she had scarcely entered her fourteenth year when she parted with her innocence” (Ambross, 8). Her parents’ strict account of her earnings and subsequent abuse may have been a factor in her introduction to sex. Ann later moved in with a linen draper after an abusive bout with her parents that resulted in “cuffs and blows” and Ann “fully determined to accept the first asylum offered” (Ambross 9). After a week spent with the draper, Catley's parents begged her to come back after recognizing her full value. Her parents welcomed her with open arms and her affair with the draper ended after a month. Ann then “resolved to indulge in them [sex] for the purposes of pecuniary advantage, as well as sensual gratification” (Ambross, 12).

She was apprenticed aged fifteen to William Bates, a composer and singing teacher, with a £200 penalty in case of misconduct from the child. It would be three years before she met Delaval at nineteen at the Marybone Gardens. She managed to gain an appearance at Vauxhall music hall at aged 17 in the summer and the Covent Garden the following fall under his mentorship. However, even though Ann gained the beginnings of success, Ann soon found herself at odds with Mr. Bates, a scandal soon emerged when Bates sold Ann's apprenticeship to her admirer Sir Francis Blake Delaval of Seaton Delaval Hall for £200. Bates was given money by Delaval in addition to make up for any financial loss to him. Catley's father, Robert Catley, could see that Ann had been sold. Aided by his employer, her father sued the rake Delaval and Bates. Lord Chief Justice Mansfield's judgement extended British law as he ruled that Delaval had offended society and the King's Bench could take action against Delaval on society's behalf; he was heavily fined. Catley's relationship with Delaval ended. Delaval found future relationships difficult and Catley continued her career. Charles Macklin was the first to discover Ann for the stage with which she “assum[ed] chaste acting, and executed many characters of difficulty with critical justice” (Ambross 36). Rosenthal recounts that although critics insisted that “genteel manners were inimitable and that only women of proper virtue and extraction could posses them,” women, like Ann, who succeeded challenged class convention (Rosenthal, 167). For Rosenthal, this exposed class identity as conditional and performative. On a trip to Ireland, Ann was wholly embraced. She took her sister Mary in, exacting similar treatment upon her as the Catleys with “violence of her fists…[resulting in bloody noses and cheeks]” (Ambross 37). Mary eventually ran off with a lover and Ann vowed not to offer her any protection; her lover quickly became disgusted with Mary, using the excuse of her affair with a Dublin college student to leave her.

Ann, unbothered, continued her life in Ireland, taking lovers at a price proportioned at her idea of the men's fortunes. Ann was “perhaps the only woman of early virtue that ever received countenance on the stage from the modest women of Ireland,” for “in spite of Catley’s blatant prostitution necessary for her survival, female spectators at the theater absolved her of responsibility for her sexual looseness” (Nussbaum, 445). On March 27, 1773, Ann sang Mandane in Arne's Artaxerxes for her benefit performance and again in 1777 (Burden, 110). In 1768 she met Lieutenant-Colonel Francis Lascelles (1744–1799) and they became a couple. She married General Lascelles and bore him several children; her “former levity gave way to domestic decorum” (Ambross, 48). Ann had, essentially, become an honest woman. She tasked the General to keep the marriage secret until after her retirement and resolved to leave her fortune to the children.

== Performance and brand ==
Ann Catley was known to "[have] a performing style to match her life history" (Burden p. 111). Her notable sexually explicit roles, such as Polly from The Beggar's Opera and Juno in The Golden Pippin, were a stylistic reflection of her own life. Ann Catley is notable for her sexual escapades, not because they were disingenuous to her but because they made her whom she embodied, Ann's sexuality was integrated into her brand. It allowed her to afford her lavish lifestyle, be self-sufficient and the constant controversy allowed her to stay relevant, allowing her to influence "the fashion of dressing the hair..catleyfied" (Pearce 815)—growing popularity with men and women through fashion and sexuality. Due to her eccentric acting style and melodious voice, Ms. Ann Catley did not shy away from knowing her worth and power. Ann would negotiate her salary in order to get paid extravagant sums that she deemed she was worth. Ann Catley embodied a business mogul for restoration women. She built a brand for herself and reversed the power dynamic of commodifying women's bodies by using it as her strength and proving her worth. Her best performances, according to Ambross, were Rosetta in Love in a Village and Euphrosyne in Comus.

Catley's “Catlified hair,” a hairstyle that was “cut down upon like a fan,” became fashionable. Ambross claims that “Miss Catley had great capabilities for an actress and...would have succeeded not only in comedy, but tragedy, had she made them her study” (Ambross, 49).Going back to the stage, Ann was but a shadow of her former glory. She attempted Macheath in The Beggar’s Opera but her voice proved inefficient and garnered pity, not praise from the audience. She moved to Ealing, Middlesex, beloved by her neighbors and the poor. Catley died of consumption in 1782 of consumption at 44 and was buried in Ealing church. Apparently, Catley died “in charity with the world, and in lamenting that the early parts of her life had not been equally virtuous and honourable with her latter days” (Ambross 55).

She performed many roles on the London and Dublin stage, until 1782. Her pupil Margaret Martyr's style is said to have come from Catley. Thomas Bellamy wrote of Martyr in 1795 "Catley's pupil - Catley's boast, Sportive, playful, arch and free, Lovely MARTYR, hail to thee!"

Catley spent her last years living at Little Ealing and died on 14 October 1789.

John O'Keeffe wrote of her: "she was one of the most beautiful women I ever saw: the expression of her eyes, and the smiles and dimples that played round her lips and cheeks, enchanting".

== In popular culture ==
A fictionalised version of Catley appears in Zoe Gilbert's Mischief Acts. In a portion of the story set during the early 1700s, a similarly fictionalised Francis Blake Delaval attempts to seduce her by dressing as Comus, unaware that Catley is secretly the daughter of the Erl-King (in this story, the same figure as Herne the Hunter).
