= Edward Delaval =

British scholar and natural philosopher (1729–1814)

Edward Hussey Delaval
- Born: 1729
- Died: 14 August 1814 (aged 84–85)
- Citizenship: British
- Education: Pembroke College, Cambridge
- Awards: Copley Medal (1766)

Edward Hussey Delaval (born 1729; died 14 August 1814 in Westminster) was a British scholar and natural philosopher.

== Life ==
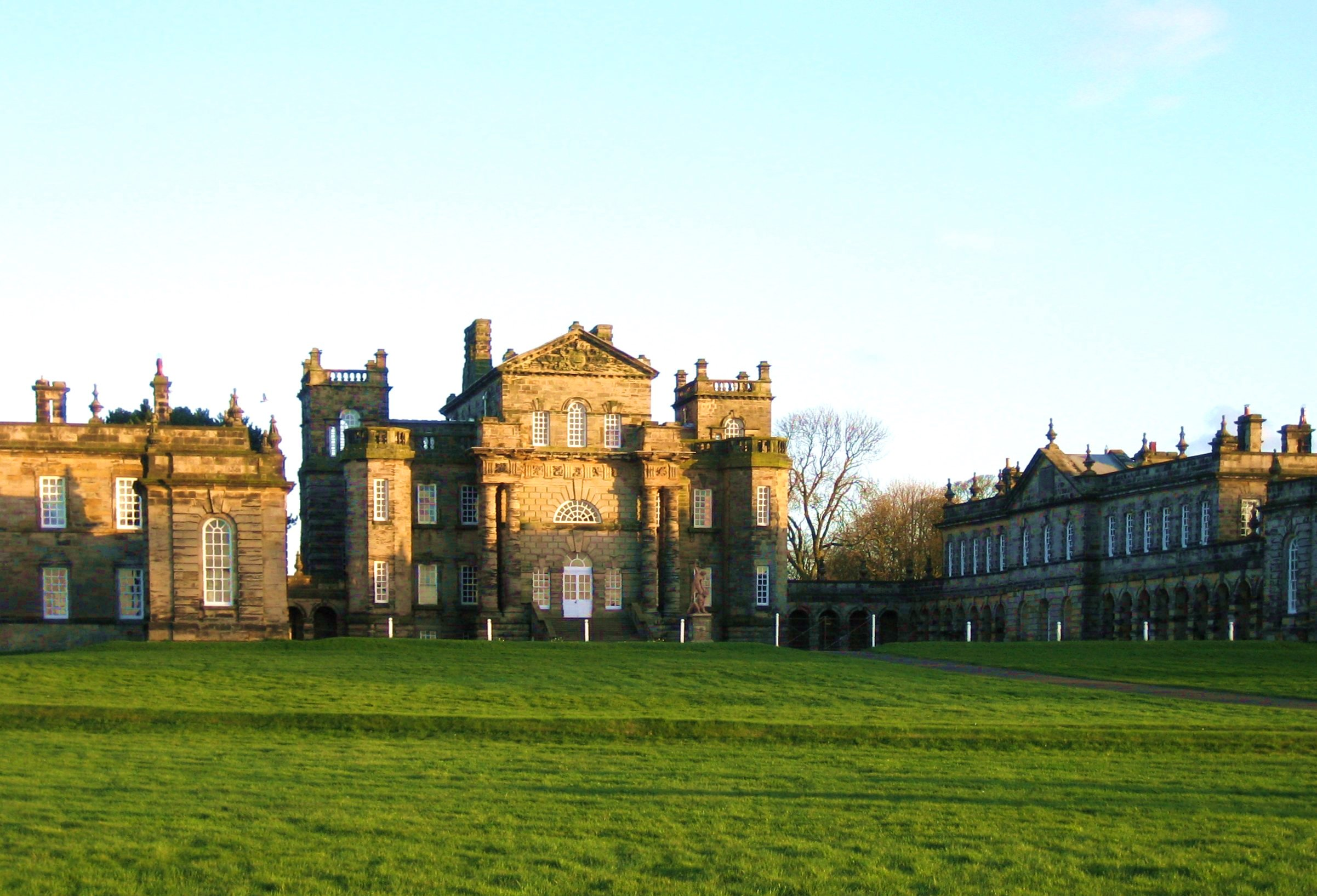
Seaton Delaval Hall, Northumberland, from the north

He was the third son of Francis Blake Delaval and his wife Rhoda Apreece. He was educated at Pembroke College, Cambridge, admitted in 1747; he graduated B.A. in 1750, M.A. in 1754, and became a Fellow there in 1755. There also he knew the poet Thomas Gray.

Delaval inherited both Seaton Delaval Hall in Northumberland and Doddington Hall in Lincolnshire, but preferred to live in London. He died at the age of 85 and was buried in Westminster Abbey.

== Works ==
Delaval shared the 1766 Copley Medal (awarded by the Royal Society) where he was cited for his research on metals and glass. His interest in glass included its use in music. His performances on musical glasses became well-known, and may have inspired Benjamin Franklin's glass harmonica.

== Family ==
Delaval married Sarah Scott (1751–1829), daughter of George Scott of Methley; they had a daughter Sarah Hussey Gunman née Delaval (c1780–1825). Seaton Delaval was inherited by his nephew Sir Jacob Astley, 5th Baronet, whose mother Rhoda Astley, wife of Sir Edward Astley, 4th Baronet, was Delaval's sister. Doddington Hall was left to Sarah.
