= William Pulteney, Viscount Pulteney =

British Whig politician and soldier

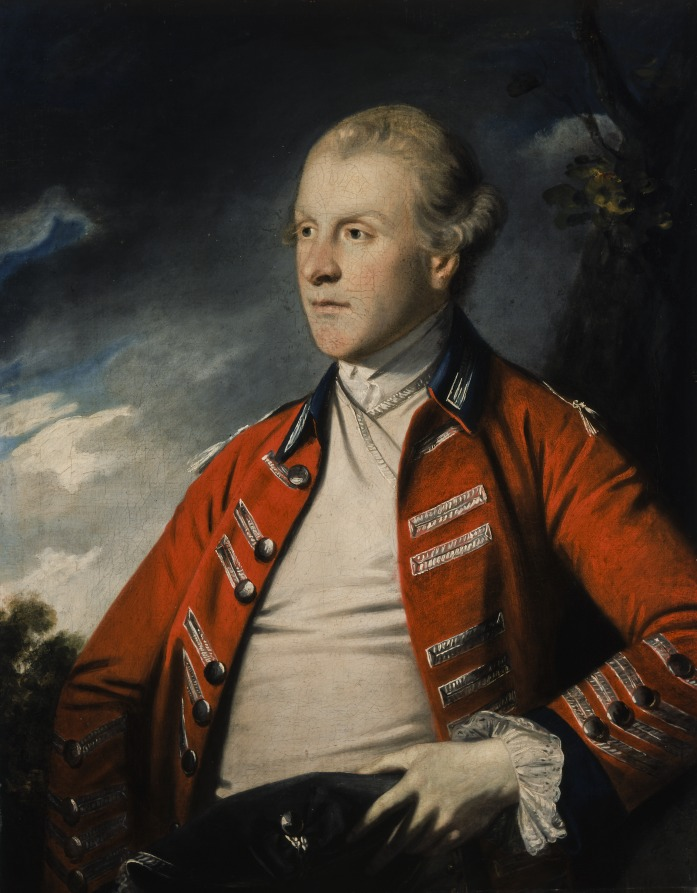
William Pulteney, Viscount Pulteney, 1761 portrait by Sir Joshua Reynolds

Arms of Pulteney: Argent, a fess dancettée gules in chief three leopard's faces sable

William Pulteney, Viscount Pulteney (9 January 1731 – 12 February 1763) was a British Whig politician and soldier. William was the only son of William Pulteney, 1st Earl of Bath. William served as a lieutenant-colonel in his father's 85th Regiment of Foot. He served in the Seven Years' War, but he died of a fever in Madrid, unmarried and childless. His father died only a year later, and his titles became extinct.

== Early life ==
He was the only son of William Pulteney, 1st Earl of Bath and his wife Anna Maria Gumley, daughter of John Gumley. Pulteney was educated at Westminster School from 1740 to 1747 and began his Grand Tour in the following year. He traveled with John Douglas first to Leipzig, met his parents in Paris in 1749 and went then to Turin.

== Career ==
In 1754, he entered the British House of Commons, sitting for Old Sarum until 1761. Subsequently, he represented Westminster as member of parliament (MP) until his death in 1763. Pulteney was appointed Lord of the Bedchamber in 1760 and served as Aide-de-Camp to King George III the United Kingdom between January and February 1763.

In 1759, his father raised the 85th Regiment of Foot and Pulteney became its lieutenant-colonel. He took part with his regiment in the Capture of Belle Île in February 1761 and moved in November to Portugal. On his return to England in 1763, he died of fever in Madrid, unmarried and childless and was buried in Westminster Abbey two months later. His father died only a year later and the titles became extinct.

Parliament of Great Britain
Preceded by Earl of Middlesex; Simon Fanshawe	Member of Parliament for Old Sarum; 1754 – 1761; With: Thomas Pitt of Boconnoc 1754–1756; Sir William Calvert 1756–1761	Succeeded by Thomas Pitt of Boconnoc; Howell Gwynne
Preceded by John Crosse; Edward Cornwallis	Member of Parliament for Westminster; 1761 – 1763; With: Edward Cornwallis 1761–1762; Edwin Sandys 1762–1763	Succeeded by Edwin Sandys; Lord Warkworth
Political offices
New office	Lord of the Bedchamber; 1760–1763	Succeeded by The Lord Willoughby de Broke
