= Delaval baronets =

Extinct baronetcy in the Baronetage of England

There have been two baronetcies created for people with the surname Delaval.

The Delaval Baronetcy of Seaton in the County of Northumberland was created in the Baronetage of England on 29 June 1660 for Ralph Delaval, of Seaton. The latter was member of parliament for Northumberland and was succeeded by his oldest son. The second Baronet died without male issue and the baronetcy devolved to his younger brother. The third Baronet, Member of Parliament for Morpeth and Northumberland experienced financial problems which led to him selling the family estate at Seaton to his cousin Admiral George Delaval (1660–1723). The baronetcy was extinct or dormant on his death.

The Delaval Baronetcy of Ford in the County of Northumberland, created in the Baronetage of Great Britain on 1 July 1761, for John Hussey Delaval, great nephew of Admiral George Delaval, merged with the baronies created for him in 1783 and 1786. With his death the baronetcy became extinct.

== Delaval baronets, of Seaton (1660) ==
- Sir Ralph Delaval, 1st Baronet (1622–1691)
- Sir Ralph Delaval, 2nd Baronet (1649–1696)
- Sir John Delaval, 3rd Baronet (1654–1729)

== Delaval baronets, of Ford (1761) ==
See Baron Delaval
