= Francis Blake Delaval (Royal Navy officer) =

Royal Navy Officer and politician (1692–1752)

Captain Francis Blake Delaval
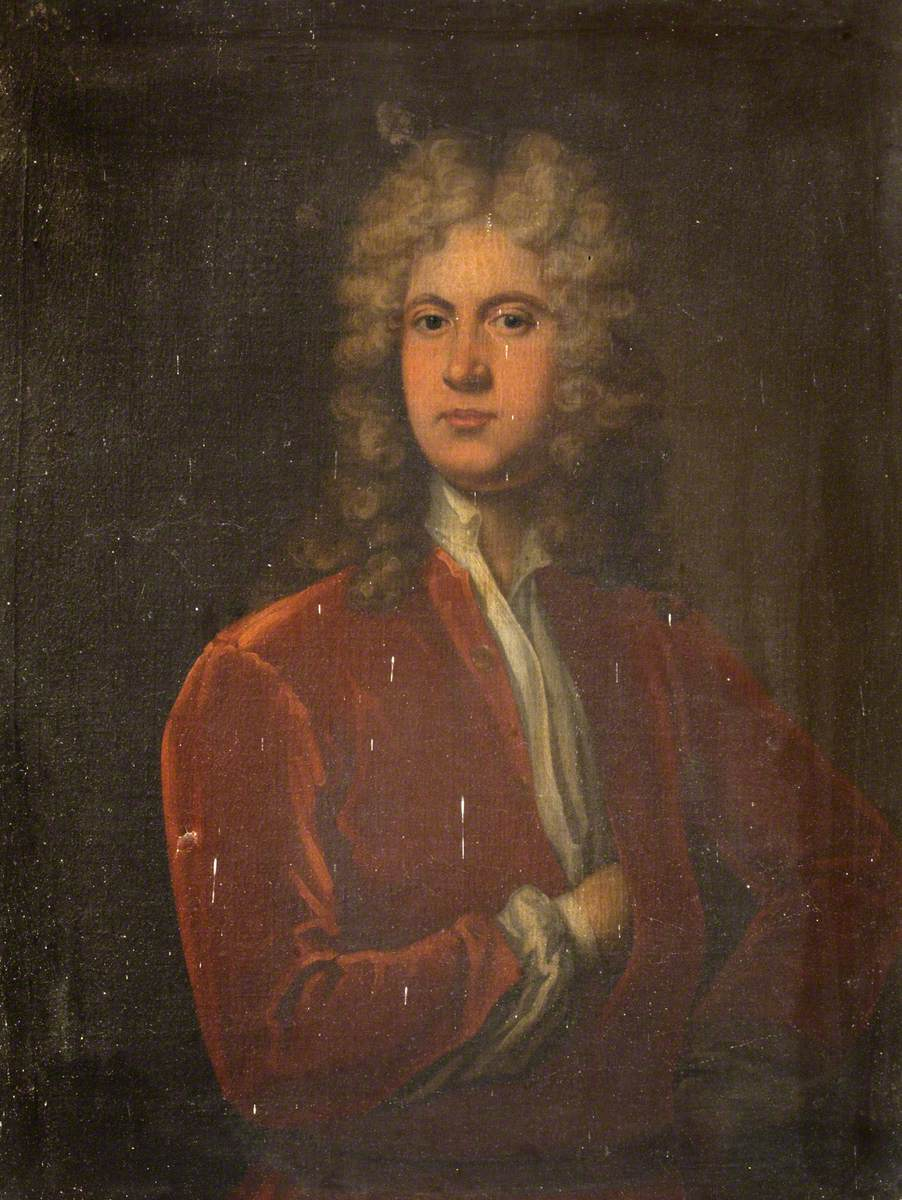
- Born: 27 December 1692 (bap.)
- Died: 9 December 1752 (aged 59); Seaton Delaval
- Spouse: Rhoda Apreece (m. 1724–1752)
- Children: 12 including: Rhoda Delaval; Sir Francis Delaval; John Delaval, 1st Baron Delaval; Edward Delaval
- Relatives: George Delaval (uncle)
- Military career
- Allegiance: Great Britain
- Branch: Royal Navy
- Service years: c.1712–1721
- Rank: Captain
- Commands: HMS Gosport; HMS Worcester
- Conflicts: Jacobite rising of 1719; Great Northern War

Member of Parliament for Northumberland
- In office 1716–1722

Captain Francis Blake Delaval (bapt. 27 December 1692 – 9 December 1752) was a Royal Navy officer and Whig Member of Parliament.

== Early life ==
He was the son of Edward Delaval (related to the Delaval baronets) and his wife Mary, daughter of Sir Francis Blake of Cogges (related to the Blake baronets). He inherited Seaton Delaval Hall from his uncle Admiral George Delaval, and Ford Castle from his mother's family.

== Career ==
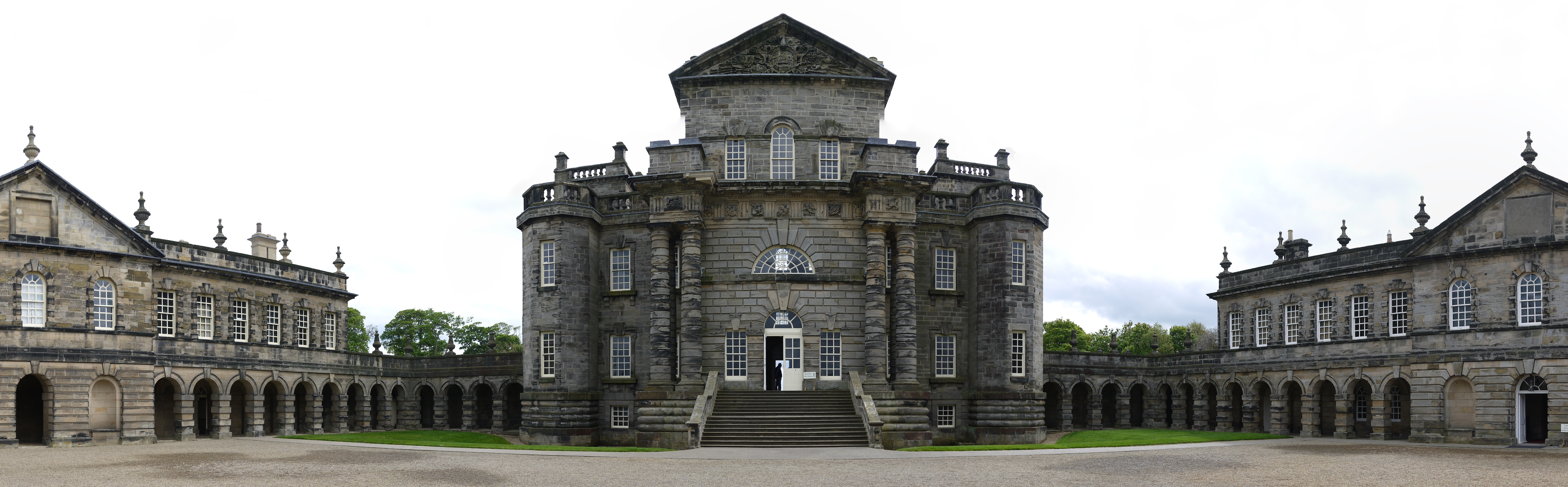
Seaton Delaval Hall near Newcastle upon Tyne.

Delaval began his career in the Royal Navy in c. 1712. He retired, on half pay, as a Lieutenant in 1715; but was made Captain in 1719. In April 1716 he was sent to intercept the Jacobite expedition during the Jacobite Rising of 1715, and the following June he was ordered to the Baltic.

He represented Northumberland in Parliament from 1716 to 1722. He was first elected with the support of Charles Howard, 3rd Earl of Carlisle. He sat as a Whig and voted with the government in all recorded divisions. From 1729 to 1730, he was High Sheriff of Northumberland.

== Personal life ==
In August 1724 he married Rhoda Apreece, heiress of Doddington Hall, Lincolnshire who was the daughter of Robert Apreece and Sarah (née Hussey) Apreece. Together, they had eleven children, including:

- Rhoda Delaval (1725–1757), who married Sir Edward Astley, 4th Baronet of Melton Constable.
- Sir Francis Blake Delaval (1727–1771), who married Lady Nassau Powlett (née Lady Isabella Tufton), a daughter of Thomas Tufton, 6th Earl of Thanet and widow of Lord Nassau Powlett, but died without legitimate issue.
- John Hussey Delaval, 1st Baron Delaval (1728–1808), who married twice but his only son predeceased him.
- Edward Hussey Delaval (1729–1814), who married Sarah Scott, daughter of George Scott of Methley.
- Anne Hussey Delaval (1737–1812), who married, as his third wife, William Stanhope, MP for Buckinghamshire, in 1759.
- Sarah Delaval (1742–1821), who married John Savile, 1st Earl of Mexborough in 1760.
- Charlotte Sophia Blake Delaval (d. 1823), who married Sir Robert Smyth, 5th Baronet in 1776.

In 1729, he completed the construction of Seaton Delaval Hall, which was finished according to John Vanbrugh's original plan and cost an estimated £10,000. On 9 December 1752, Captain Delaval fell down the steps of the South Portico of Seaton Delaval Hall, and died of his injuries. His uncle, George Delaval, from whom he inherited the Hall, also died from a fall on the estate; he fell from his horse.

=== Descendants ===
Through his son Edward, he was a grandfather of Sarah Hussey (née Delaval) Gunman, who inherited Doddington Hall.

Through his daughter Rhoda, he was a grandfather of Jacob Astley, through whom Seaton Delaval passed to the Astley family (later Baron Hastings).

Through his daughter Sarah, he was a grandfather of John Savile, 2nd Earl of Mexborough.
