= Sir Edward Astley, 4th Baronet =

British politician (1729–1802)

Edward Astley
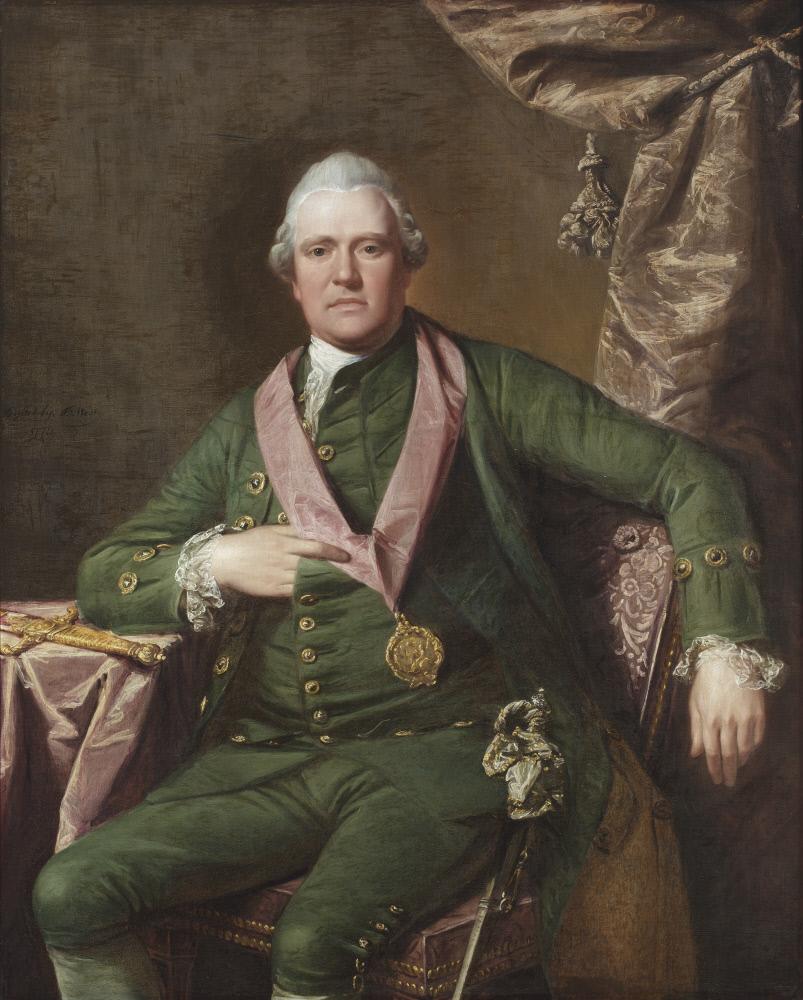

4th Baronet
- In office 1760–1802
- Succeeded by: Sir Jacob Astley, 5th Baronet

Member of the British Parliament for Norfolk
- In office 1768–1790

Personal details
- Born: 1729
- Died: 27 March 1802
- Spouses: Rhoda Delaval; Anne Milles; Elizabeth Bullen
- Parents: Sir Jacob Astley, 3rd Baronet (father); Lucy le Strange (mother)

Sir Edward Astley, 4th Baronet (baptised 26 December 1729 – 27 March 1802) was a British politician who sat in the House of Commons from 1768 to 1790.

== Early life and career ==
He was the oldest son of Sir Jacob Astley, 3rd Baronet and his second wife Lucy le Strange, youngest daughter of Sir Nicholas le Strange, 4th Baronet. He was admitted to Pembroke College, Cambridge in 1747. In 1760, Astley succeeded his father as baronet.

He was appointed High Sheriff of Norfolk for 1763–64 and in 1768 stood successfully as Member of Parliament (MP) for Norfolk, the same constituency his great-grandfather Sir Jacob Astley, 1st Baronet had represented, too. Astley held this seat unopposed until the 1790 general election when he retired. He was a supporter of parliamentary reform.

Astley had a younger brother, John Astley (born 1735), who was Rector of several Norfolk parishes.

== Marriage and children ==
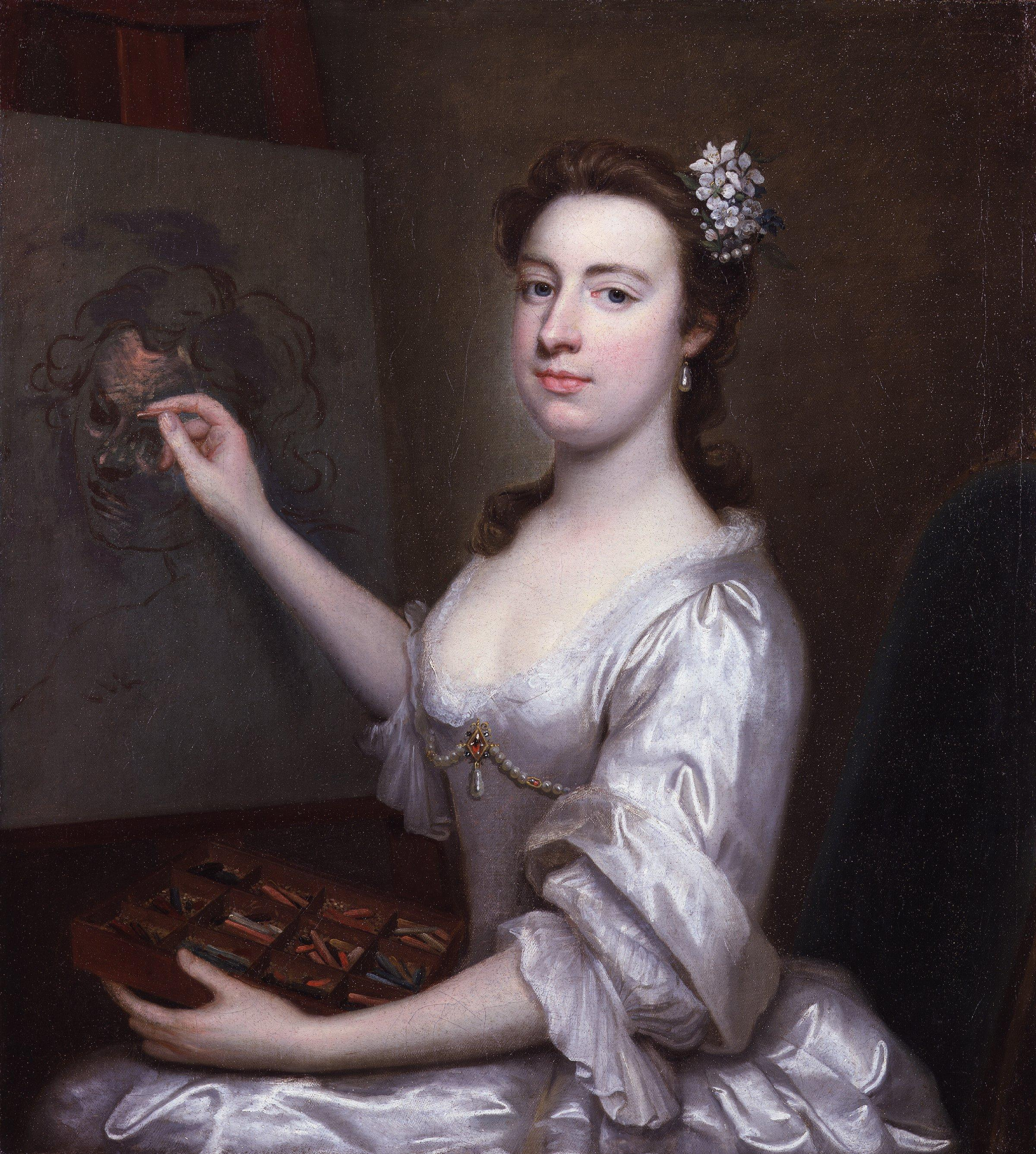
Rhoda Delaval, first wife of Edward Astley, by Arthur Pond.

Astley married firstly Rhoda Delaval, oldest daughter of Francis Blake Delaval in 1751. Rhoda died in childbirth in 1757 and Astley married secondly Anne Milles, youngest daughter of Christopher Milles, at St Margaret's Church, Westminster two years later. She died in 1792, and he married lastly Elizabeth Bullen in the following year. Astley had three sons and a daughter by his first wife and five sons and two daughters by his second wife. On his death in 1802 Astley was succeeded in the baronetcy by his third but oldest surviving son Sir Jacob Astley, 5th Baronet, who at this time sat also for Norfolk in the House of Commons.

Parliament of Great Britain
Preceded by Sir Armine Wodehouse, Bt; Thomas de Grey	Member of Parliament for Norfolk; 1768 – 1790; With: Thomas de Grey 1768–74; Wenman Coke 1774–76; Thomas Coke 1776–84; Sir John Wodehouse, Bt 1784–90	Succeeded by Thomas Coke; Sir John Wodehouse, Bt
Baronetage of England
Preceded by Jacob Astley	Baronet (of Hill Morton); 1760–1802	Succeeded by Jacob Astley
