= Francis Blake Delaval (politician) =

British actor, soldier, and politician

The Right Honourable Sir Francis Blake Delaval KB
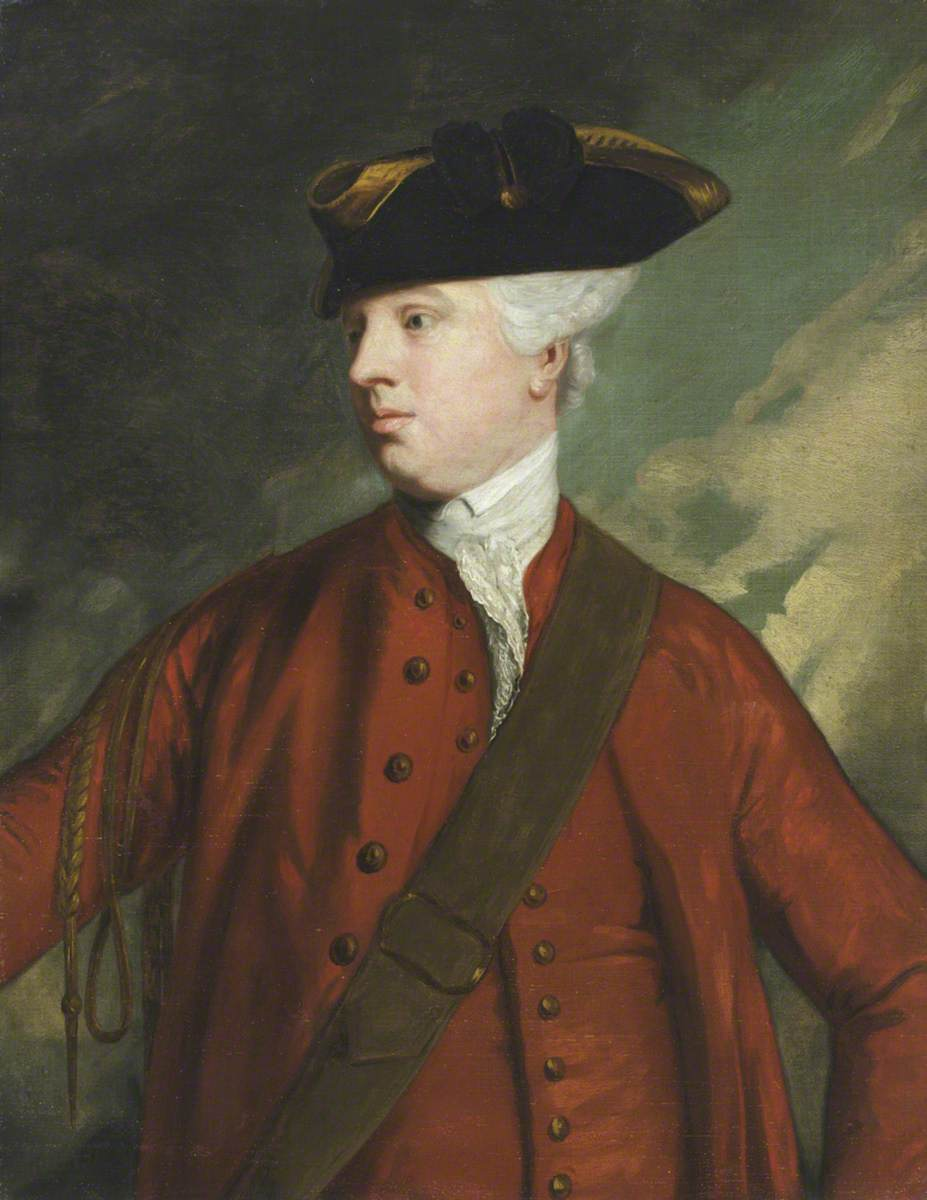
- Portrait of Delaval by Joshua Reynolds c.1759

Member of Parliament for Andover
- In office 1754–1768 Serving with Sir John Griffin
- Preceded by: John Pollen; Sir John Griffin
- Succeeded by: Sir John Griffin; Benjamin Lethieullier

Member of Parliament for Hindon
- In office 1751–1754 Serving with Bisse Richards
- Preceded by: Valens Comyn; Bisse Richards
- Succeeded by: Bisse Richards; James Dawkins

Personal details
- Born: 16 March 1727
- Died: 7 August 1771 (aged 44)
- Parent(s): Francis Blake Delaval; Rhoda Apreece
- Education: Westminster School; Eton College
- Alma mater: Christ Church, Oxford

Sir Francis Blake Delaval KB (16 March 1727 – 7 August 1771) was a British actor, soldier and Member of Parliament. He had a privileged and aristocratic education at Westminster School, Eton College and then Christ Church at Oxford University.

== Early life ==
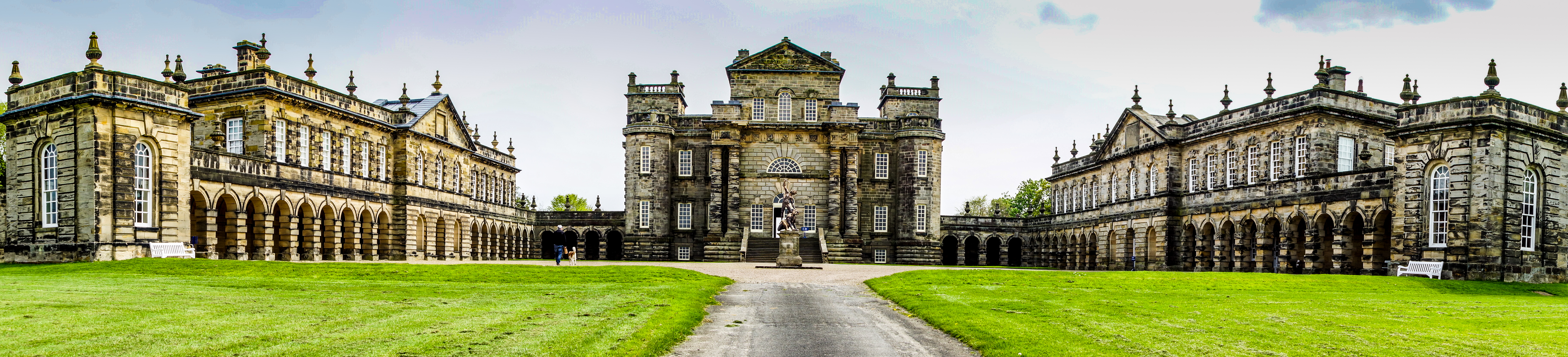
Seaton Delaval Hall

Delaval was the eldest son of Francis Blake Delaval (1692–1752), of Seaton Delaval Hall, and Rhoda Apreece, heiress of Doddington Hall, Lincolnshire. His father served as a captain in the Royal Navy and represented Northumberland in Parliament.

== Career ==
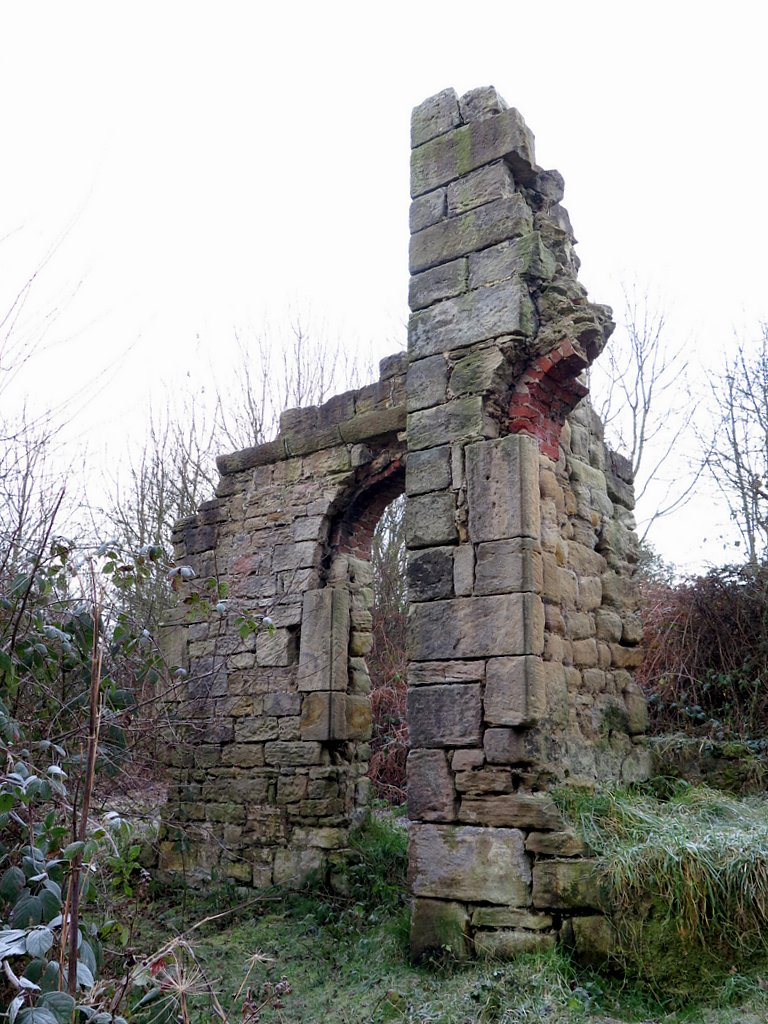
Remains of Starlight Castle in 2017

He succeeded to his father's estate in 1752. He added to it by building the folly known as Starlight Castle, overlooking Holywell Dene which leads to Seaton Sluice. It was allegedly built in a single day to win a wager. Little survives of it now apart from a single stone arch.

Francis was an actor in a group led by Samuel Foote. He was a gambler but could not afford that lifestyle.

=== Military career ===
His military career was of short duration. He took part in the Raid on St Malo, and received a knighthood for his bravery when storming the Brittany beach, although there were no French troops present to offer resistance.

=== Political career ===
He represented Hindon in Wiltshire in Parliament from 1751 to 1754, and Andover in Hampshire from 1754 to 1768.

== Personal life ==
Delaval fell in love with a singer and actor named Ann Catley in about 1760. She had been apprenticed to William Bates, who was a composer and singing teacher. Bates sold Ann's apprenticeship to Delaval. Bates was given money by Delaval to make up for any financial loss to him, but Catley's father could see that Ann had been sold. Aided by his employer, her father sued Delaval and Bates but to no benefit. Eventually the relationship with Delaval ended and Catley continued her career.

=== Marriage ===
He married the wealthy (and much older) Lady Nassau Powlett (née Lady Isabella Tufton), daughter of Thomas Tufton, 6th Earl of Thanet and widow of Lord Nassau Powlett, but it was not a happy marriage. His wife filed a lawsuit against him because of adultery with an actress, Miss La Roche, for which Isabella unknowingly forked out £1500.

His London townhouse was 11 Downing Street, now the official home of the Chancellor of the Exchequer.

He suffered a stroke, and was memorialized by his obituarist as "'the very soul of frolic and amusement (who) overbalanced a few foibles by a thousand amiable qualities". He left four illegitimate children but no legitimate ones and was succeeded by his younger brother John Hussey Delaval, later Baron Delaval.

== In popular culture ==
A fictionalised version of Delaval appears in Zoe Gilbert's Mischief Acts. In a portion of the story set during the early 1700s, Delaval attempts to seduce Ann Catley by dressing as Comus, unaware that Catley is secretly the daughter of the Erl-King (in this story, the same figure as Herne the Hunter).

Parliament of Great Britain
Preceded by Valens Comyn; Bisse Richards	Member of Parliament for Hindon; 1751–1754; With: Bisse Richards	Succeeded by Bisse Richards; James Dawkins
Preceded by John Pollen; Sir John Griffin	Member of Parliament for Andover; 1754–1768; With: Sir John Griffin	Succeeded by Sir John Griffin; Benjamin Lethieullier
