= George Delaval =

Royal Navy officer, diplomat and politician (1667-1723)

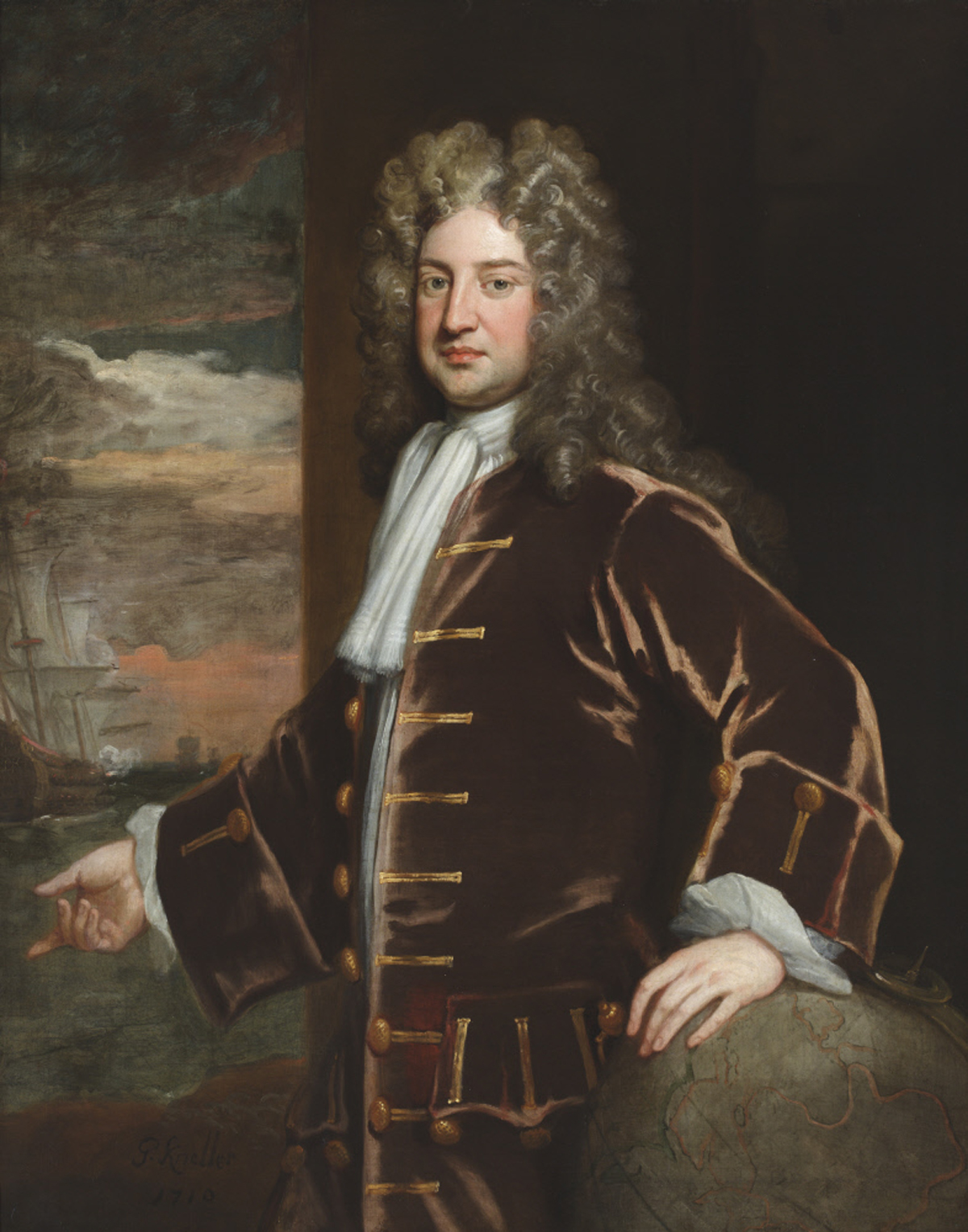
1710 portrait of Delaval by Sir Godfrey Kneller

Vice-Admiral George Delaval (c. 1667 – 22 June 1723) was a Royal Navy officer, diplomat and Whig politician who served as the British ambassador to Portugal from 1710 to 1714. He also represented West Looe in the House of Commons of Great Britain from 1715 to 1723.

== Family ==
Delaval was of a junior branch of the Delaval family, the son of George Delaval of North Dissington, Northumberland. His father left him a legacy of only £100, but he went on to make a large fortune from his naval and diplomatic career.

== Naval career ==
Delaval joined the Royal Navy and by 1693 had achieved the rank of 3rd lieutenant aboard HMS Lenox. In 1698 he travelled to North Africa to negotiate the release of British prisoners and concluded a treaty with Morocco in 1700. On his return as Captain Delaval in May 1700, he took command of the newly commissioned 4th rate man of war HMS Tilbury.

He commanded HMS Tilbury in the vanguard at the Battle of Málaga in the War of the Spanish Succession on 24 August 1704. He was promoted to rear admiral in 1718 and to vice admiral in 1722.

== Diplomatic and political career ==
Delaval's diplomatic career took him to Spain in 1705, with Lord Peterborough. In 1707 he was envoy to Lisbon and, in 1708, concluded an agreement with Ismail Ibn Sharif, the Sultan of Morocco, not to molest each other's ships. He went to Portugal for three years in 1710 as Envoy Extraordinary to the King of Portugal.

Delaval was returned unopposed as Whig Member of Parliament for the rotten borough of West Looe, Cornwall at the 1715 general election. In 1716, he was appointed Deputy Lieutenant of Northumberland. He was returned unopposed for West Looe again at the 1722 general election. In Parliament, he voted with the Government in all recorded divisions.

== Estates ==
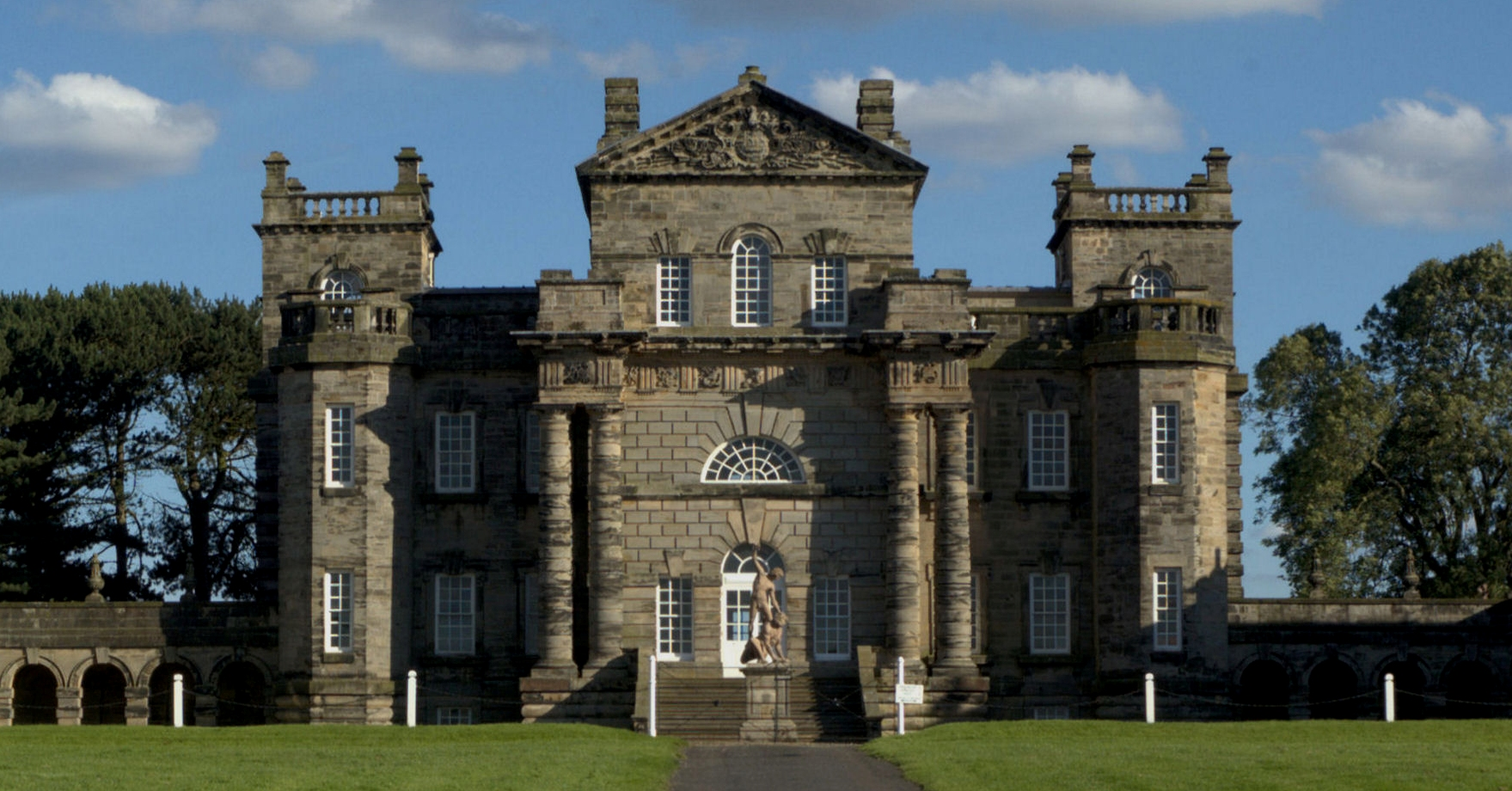
Seaton Delaval Hall near Newcastle upon Tyne

In 1716 Delaval purchased for £5000 the forfeited estate of the Shafto family at Bavington Hall, Northumberland, and in 1718 he bought the ancient seat of the Delaval family at Seaton Delaval from his impoverished cousin, Sir John Delaval, 3rd Baronet. He retained the services of the architect Sir John Vanbrugh and began an ambitious rebuilding of Seaton Delaval Hall.

He did not live to see the new house completed; in 1723, at the age of 55, he died as a result of falling off his horse. The site of the accident was marked by the erection of an obelisk, the base of which survives to the west of the hall, next to the turning to New Hartley.

Delaval left no issue. He restored Bavington Hall to the Shaftos by bequeathing it to George Shafto, who had married his sister. He left Seaton Delaval Hall to his nephew Francis Blake Delaval.

Diplomatic posts
Preceded by Henri de Massue, Earl of Galway	Envoy to Portugal; 1710–1714	Succeeded by Henry Worsley
Parliament of Great Britain
Preceded by Rear Admiral Sir Charles Wager; John Trelawny	Member of Parliament for West Looe; 1715–1723; With: Thomas Maynard 1715-1722; Sir John Trelawny1722-1723	Succeeded by Edward Trelawny; Sir John Trelawny
