= Doddington Hall, Lincolnshire =

English country house built 1593 to 1600

Doddington Hall
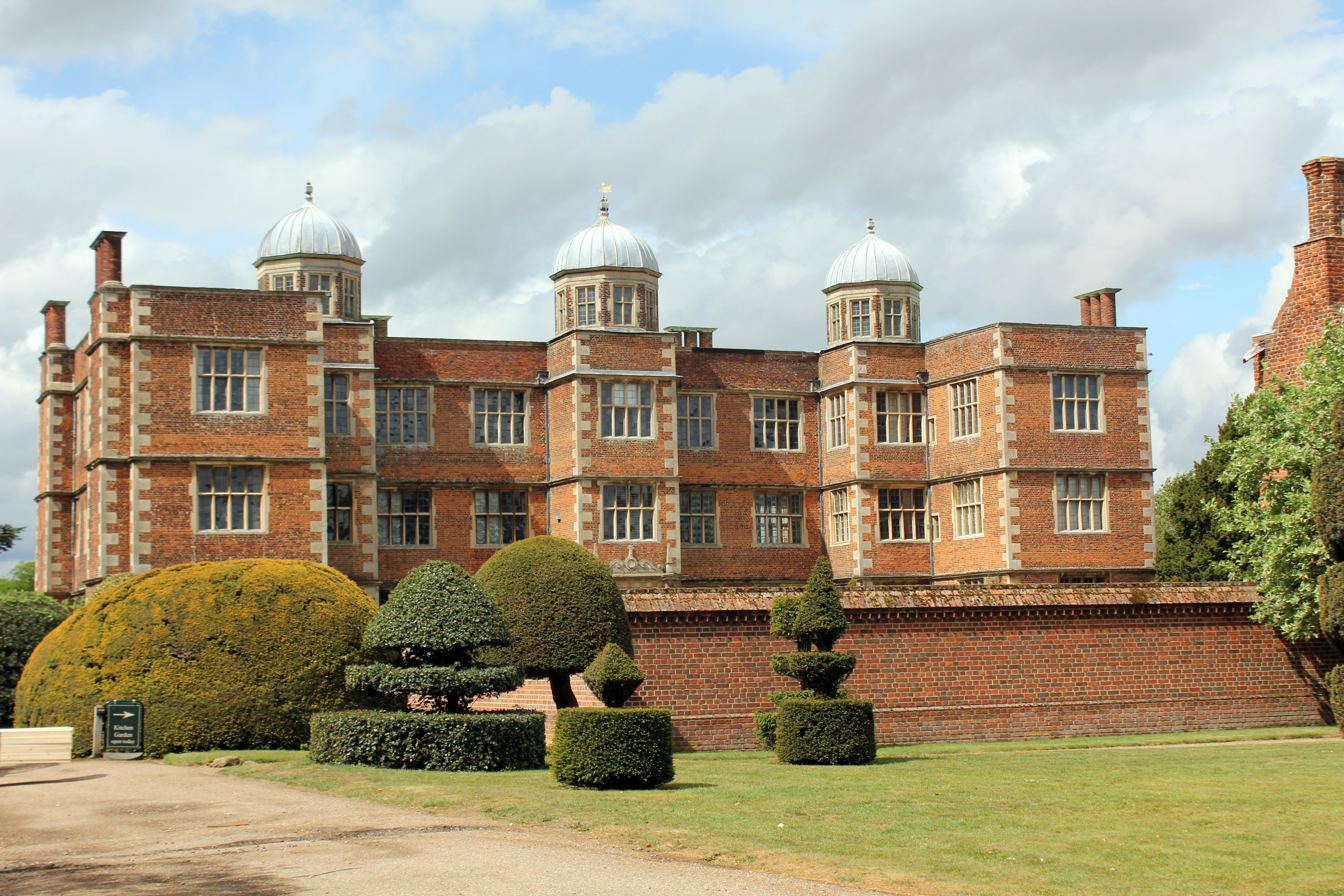
- Doddington Hall

- Location within Lincolnshire
- 53°13′08″N 0°39′14″W
- Type: Prodigy house
- Location: Doddington, Lincolnshire

History
- Built: 1595–1600
- Built for: Thomas Tailor

Site notes
- Architect: Robert Smythson
- Architectural style: Elizabethan
- Owner: Claire & James Birch
- Website: doddingtonhall.com

Listed Building – Grade I
- Official name: Doddington Hall
- Designated: 22 December 1983
- Reference no.: 1164612

Listed Building – Grade II*
- Official name: Gatehouse to Doddington Hall
- Designated: 22 December 1983
- Reference no.: 1360505

Listed Building – Grade II*
- Official name: Walls and Gates to Doddington Hall
- Designated: 22 December 1983
- Reference no.: 1061959

National Register of Historic Parks and Gardens
- Official name: Doddington Hall
- Designated: 24 June 1985
- Reference no.: 1000975

Doddington Hall is, from the outside, an Elizabethan prodigy house or mansion complete with walled courtyards and a gabled gatehouse. Inside it was largely updated in the 1760s. It is located in the village of Doddington, to the west of the city of Lincoln in Lincolnshire, England.

== History ==
Doddington Hall was built between 1595 and 1600 by Robert Smythson for Thomas Tailor, who was a lawyer, the Recorder to the Bishop of Lincoln. It is a grade I listed building. The facade is wide, but the house is only a single room deep at the centre.

In the 12th century the manor of Doddington was owned by the Pigot family who sold it to Sir Thomas Burgh in 1450, and eventually to John Savile of Howley Hall in Leeds. In 1593, he sold the manor house to Thomas Tailor who commissioned the present house. It was inherited by his son, and then his granddaughter Elizabeth Anton who married Sir Edward Hussey of Honington in Lincolnshire. Their son Sir Thomas Hussey inherited in 1658. Sir Thomas's three daughters were his co-heiresses when he died in 1706. Mrs Sarah Apreece was the surviving heiress and on her death in 1749, her daughter Rhoda, wife of Captain Francis Blake Delaval (the elder) of Seaton Delaval Hall in Northumberland, inherited. It then passed to her second son, Sir John Hussey-Delaval, and he had improvements made to the Hall in 1761 by Thomas and William Lumby of Lincoln. John's younger brother Edward Delaval inherited in 1808, and his daughter, Mrs Sarah Gunman, who inherited on her father's death in 1814, left the Hall to Lieutenant Colonel George Jarvis in 1829. On his death it passed to his cousin the Rev Robert Eden Cole, and it remains in private ownership today. In the mid 20th century the hall was restored by Laurence Bond and Francis Johnson.

The hall's contents, including textiles, ceramics, porcelain, furniture and pictures, reflect 400 years of unbroken family occupation. In 1762, Sir John Hussey Delaval covered every inch of the Holly Room – even the back of the doors – with tapestries showing country scenes. The tapestries were made in Flanders in the early 17th century.

The hall and 6 acres (24,000 m^{2}) of walled and wild gardens, with flowering from early spring until autumn, are open to the public. A temple designed by Antony Jarvis in 1973 stands in the gardens. Outdoor theatre and sculpture exhibitions are held in the gardens. Other businesses have been developed on the estate such as a farm shop, home store, country clothing shop, bicycle shop, two cafés, a tea room, restaurant, holiday cottages, weddings and the sale of Christmas trees.

Daniel Codd in Haunted Lincolnshire claims that Doddington Hall is haunted.

The parkland and gardens of Doddington Hall are listed Grade II* on the Register of Historic Parks and Gardens.

== Gallery ==
=== Exterior ===
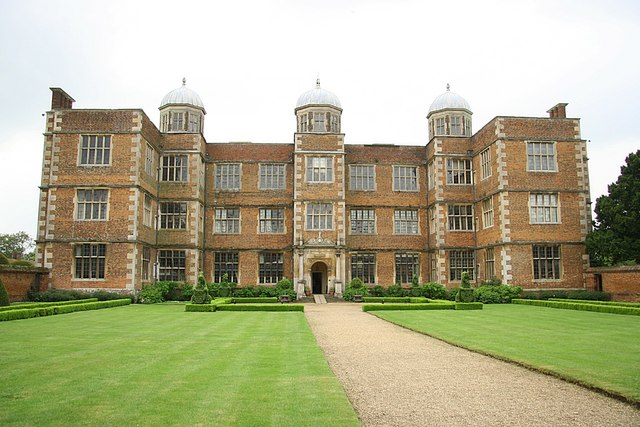
East (Entrance) Front

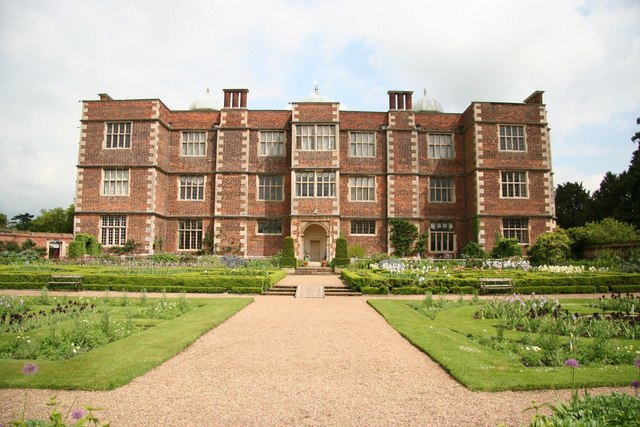
West (Garden) Front

=== Interior ===
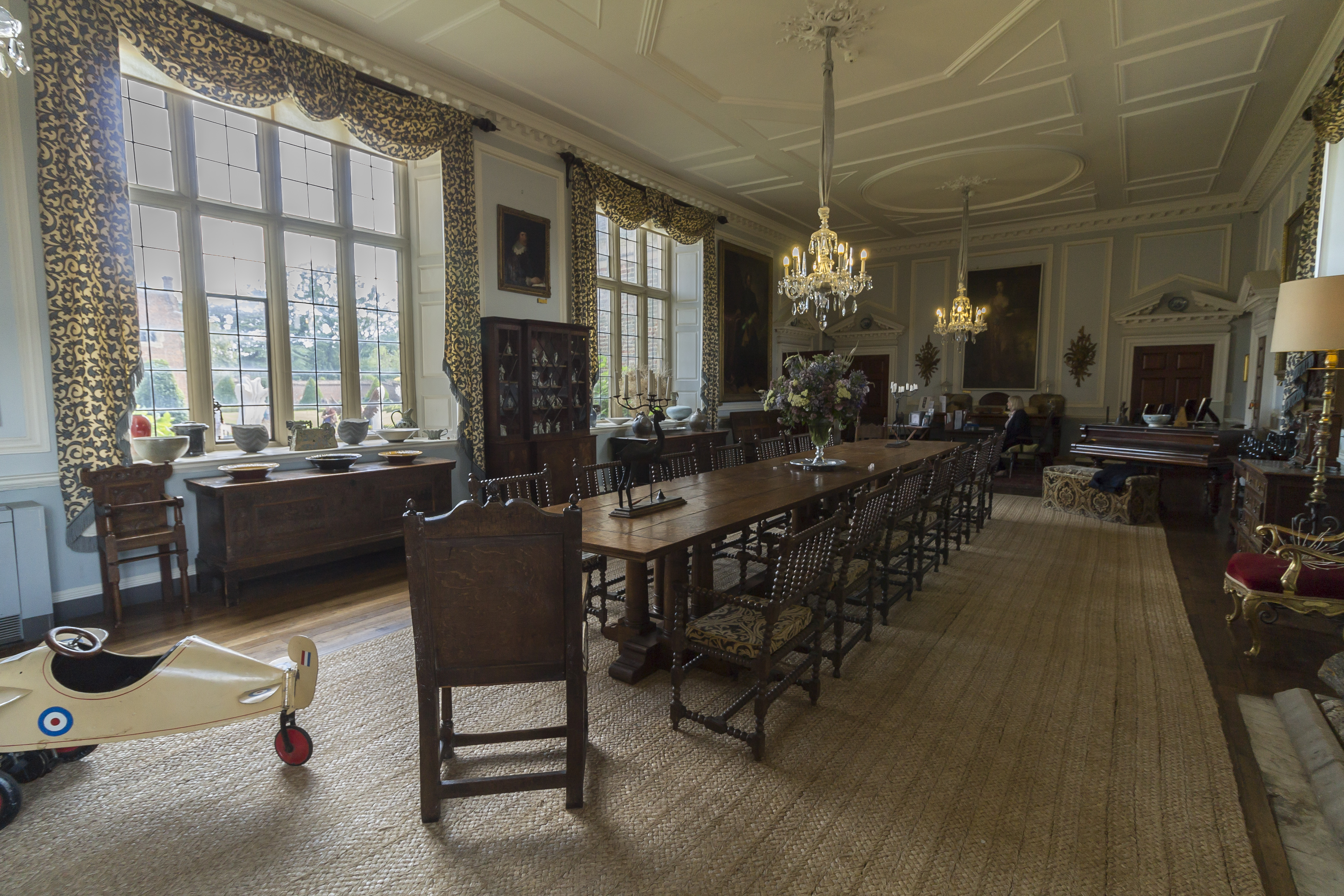
Entrance Hall

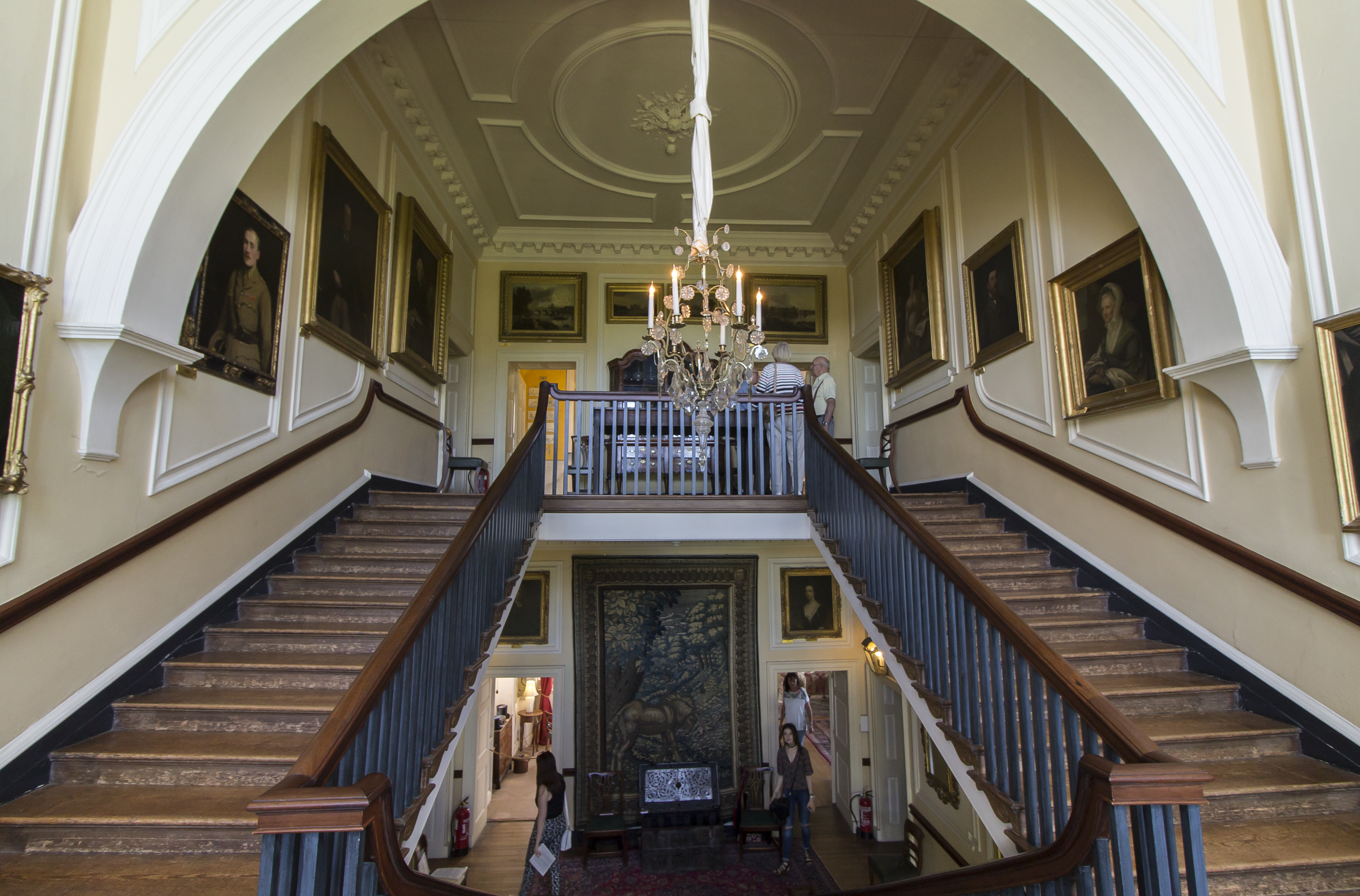
Main Stair (looking to the second floor)

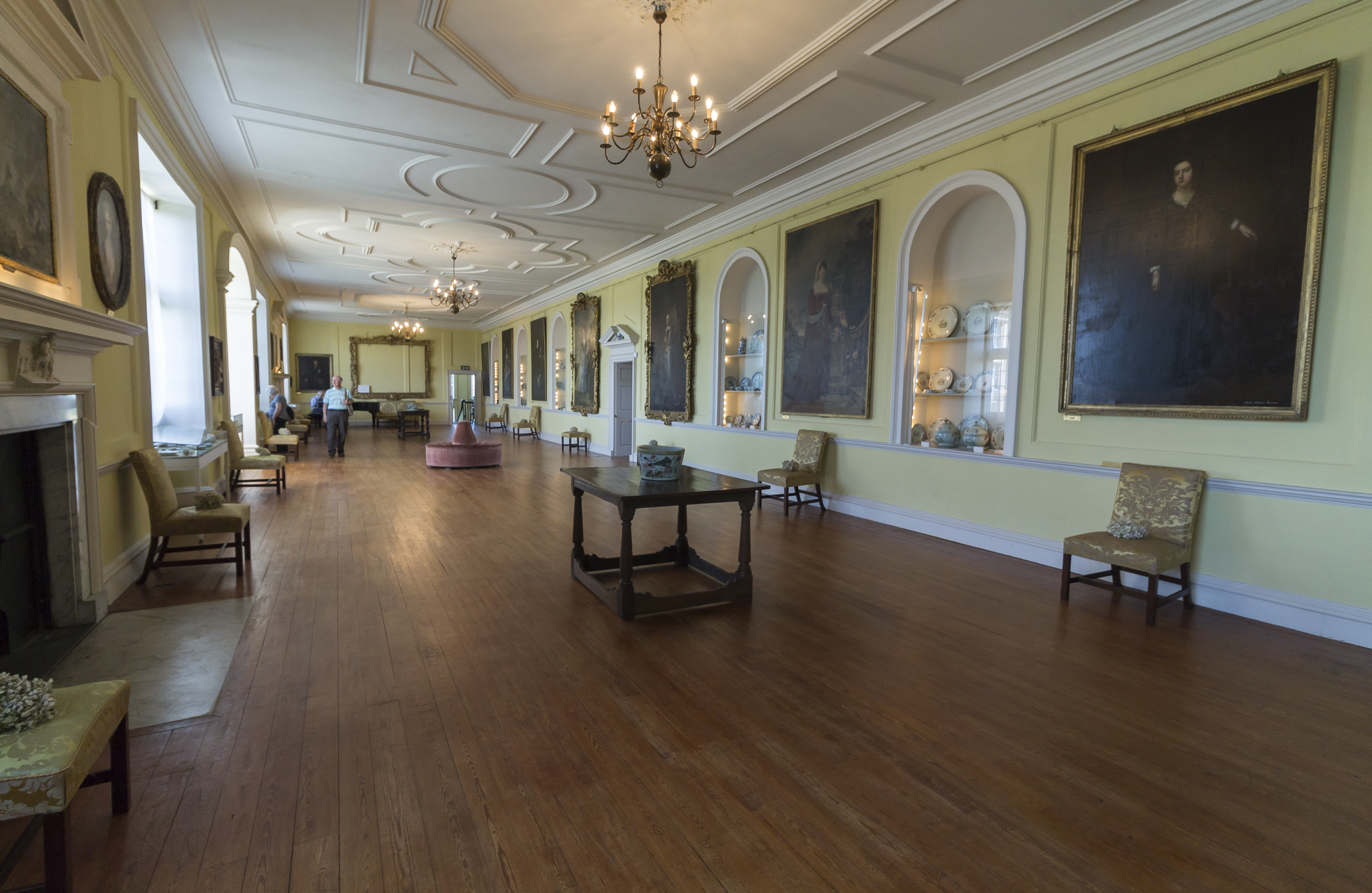
Long Gallery

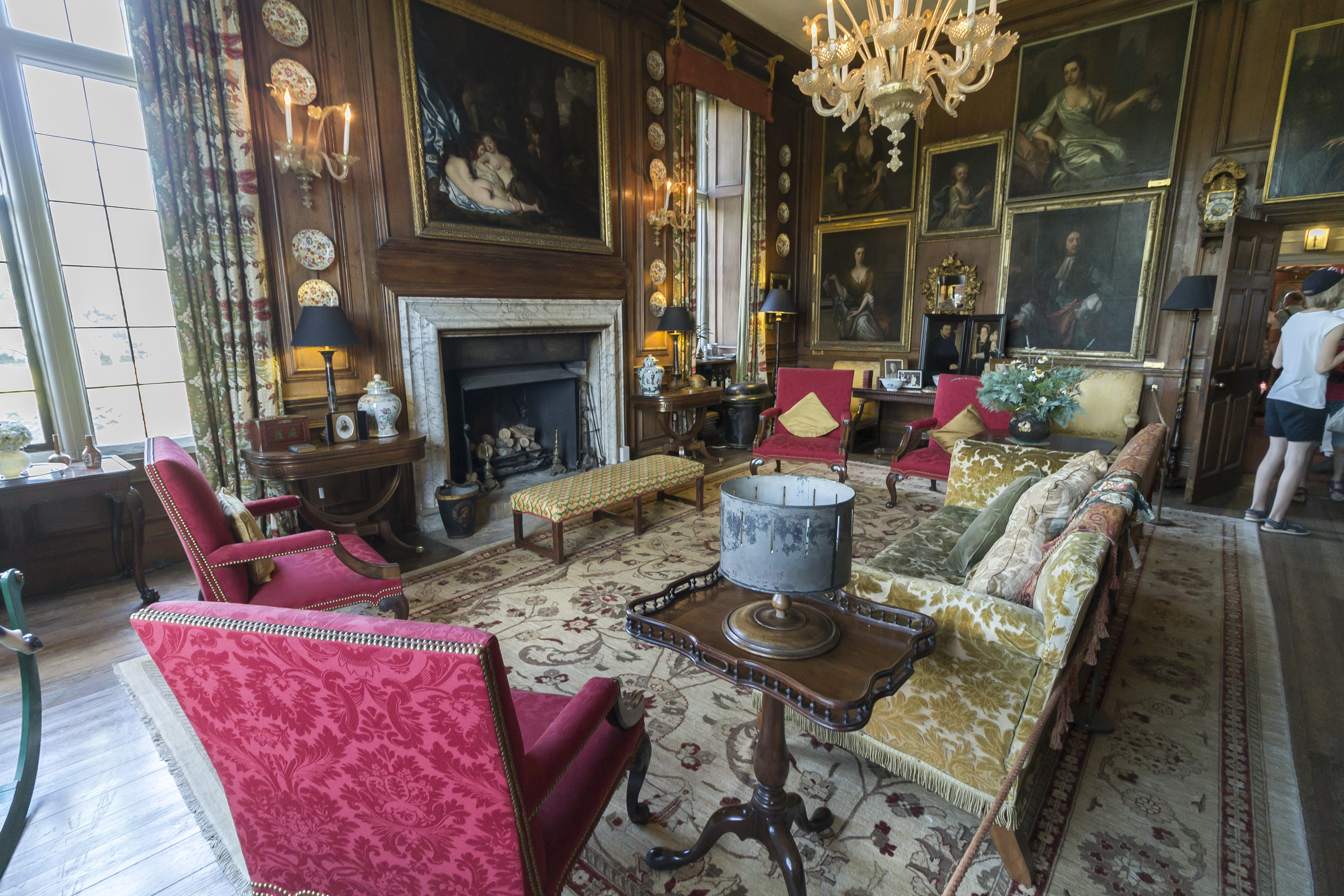
Brown Parlour

=== Gardens ===
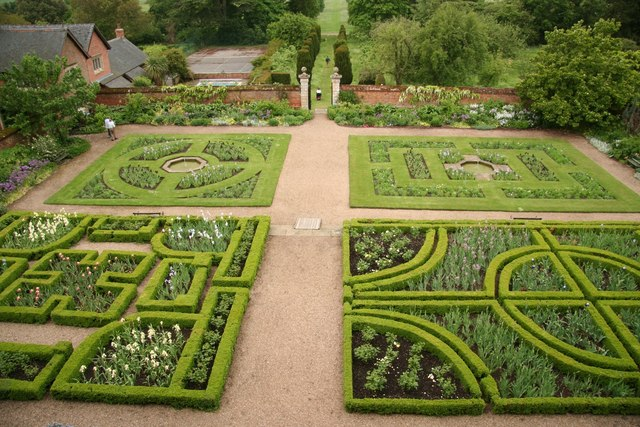
West Garden

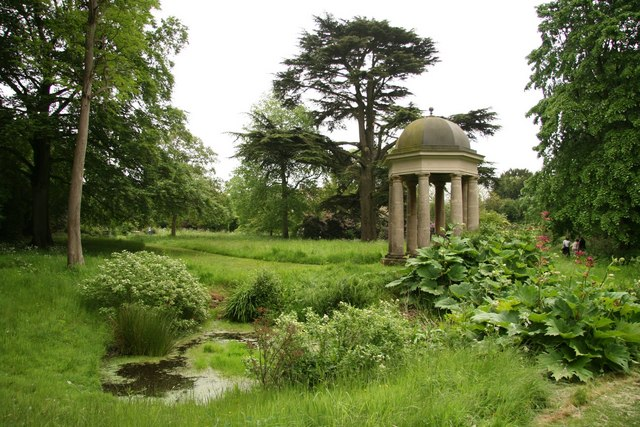
Temple of the Winds

== Sources ==
- Jenkins, Simon (2003). England's Thousand Best Houses. Allen Lane. ISBN 0713995963.
