= List of schools in Northumberland =

This is a list of schools in Northumberland, England.

== State-funded schools ==
=== Primary and first schools ===
- Abbeyfields First School, Morpeth
- Acomb First School, Acomb
- Adderlane Academy, Prudhoe
- Allendale Primary School, Allendale
- Amble First School, Amble
- Amble Links First School, Amble
- Beaconhill Community Primary School, Cramlington
- Beaufront First School, Sandhoe
- Bede Academy, Blyth
- Bedlington Station Primary School, Bedlington
- Bedlington West End Primary School, Bedlington
- Bedlington Whitley Memorial CE Primary School, Bedlington
- Belford Primary School, Belford
- Bellingham Primary School, Bellingham
- Belsay Primary School, Belsay
- Berwick St Mary's CE First School, Berwick-upon-Tweed
- Bothal Primary School, Ashington
- Branton Community Primary School, Branton
- Broomhaugh CE First School, Riding Mill
- Broomhill First School, Morpeth
- Broomley First School, Stocksfield
- Burnside Primary School, Cramlington
- Cambo First School, Cambo
- Cambois Primary School, Cambois
- Central Primary School, Ashington
- Chollerton CE First School, Barrasford
- Choppington Primary School, Choppington
- Corbridge CE First School, Corbridge
- Cragside CE Primary School, Cramlington
- Cramlington Northburn Primary School, Cramlington
- Cramlington Shanklea Primary School, Cramlington
- Cramlington Village Primary School, Cramlington
- Croftway Primary Academy, Blyth
- Darras Hall Primary School, Ponteland
- Eastlea Primary School, Cramlington
- Ellingham CE Primary School, Ellingham
- Ellington Primary School, Ellington
- Embleton Vincent Edwards CE Primary School, Embleton
- Felton CE Primary School, Felton
- Grange View CE First School, Widdrington Village
- Greenhaugh Primary School, Greenhaugh
- Greenhead CE Primary School, Greenhead
- Haltwhistle Primary Academy, Haltwhistle
- Harbottle CE First School, Harbottle
- Hareside Primary School, Cramlington
- Heddon-on-the-Wall St Andrew's CE Primary School, Heddon-on-the-Wall
- Henshaw CE Primary School, Henshaw
- Hexham First School, Hexham
- Hipsburn Primary School, Lesbury
- Holy Island CE First School, Lindisfarne
- Holy Trinity CE First School, Berwick-upon-Tweed
- Holywell Village First School, Holywell
- Horton Grange Primary School, Blyth
- Hugh Joicey CE Aided First School, Ford
- Humshaugh CE First School, Humshaugh
- Kielder Primary School and Nursery, Kielder
- Linton Primary School, Linton
- Longhorsley St Helen's CE First School, Longhorsley
- Longhoughton CE Primary School, Longhoughton
- Lowick CE First School, Lowick
- Malvin's Close Academy, Blyth
- Meadowdale Academy, Bedlington
- Mickley First School, Mickley
- Morpeth All Saints CE First School, Morpeth
- Morpeth First School, Morpeth
- Morpeth Road Academy, Blyth
- Morpeth Stobhillgate First School, Morpeth
- Mowbray Primary School, Guide Post
- NCEA Bishop's Primary School, Ashington
- NCEA Warkworth CE Primary School, Warkworth
- New Delaval Primary School, New Delaval
- New Hartley First School, New Hartley
- Newbrough CE Primary School, Fourstones
- Newsham Primary School, Blyth
- Norham St Ceolwulf's CE First School, Norham
- Otterburn Primary School, Otterburn
- Ovingham CE First School, Ovingham
- Pegswood Primary School, Morpeth
- Ponteland Community Primary School, Ponteland
- Ponteland Primary School, Ponteland
- Prudhoe Castle First School, Prudhoe
- Prudhoe West Academy, Prudhoe
- Red Row First School, Morpeth
- Richard Coates CE Primary School, Ponteland
- Ringway Primary School, Guide Post
- Rothbury First School, Rothbury
- St Aidan's RC Primary School, Ashington
- St Bede's RC Primary School, Bedlington
- St Cuthbert's RC First School, Berwick-upon-Tweed
- St Mary's RC First School, Hexham
- St Matthew's RC Primary School, Prudhoe
- St Michael's CE First School, Alnwick
- St Paul's RC Primary School, Alnwick
- St Robert's RC First School, Morpeth
- St Wilfrid's RC Primary School, Blyth
- Ss Peter and Paul's RC Primary Academy, Cramlington
- Scremerston First School, Scremerston
- Seahouses Primary School, Seahouses
- Seaton Delaval First School, Seaton Delaval
- Seaton Sluice First School, Seaton Sluice
- Seghill First School, Seghill
- The Sele First School, Hexham
- Shaftoe Trust Academy, Haydon Bridge
- Shilbottle Primary School, Shilbottle
- Slaley First School, Slaley
- Spittal Community School, Spittal
- Stakeford Primary School, Stakeford
- Stamfordham Primary School, Stamfordham
- Stannington First School, Stannington
- Stead Lane Primary School, Bedlington
- Swansfield Park Primary School, Alnwick
- Swarland Primary School, Swarland
- Thropton Village First School, Thropton
- Tritlington CE First School, Tritlington
- Tweedmouth Prior Park First School, Tweedmouth
- Tweedmouth West First School, Tweedmouth
- Wark CE Primary School, Wark on Tyne
- Whalton CE Primary School, Whalton
- Whitfield CE Primary School, Whitfield
- Whitley Chapel CE First School, Whitley Chapel
- Whittingham CE Primary School, Whittingham
- Whittonstall First School, Whittonstall
- Wooler First School, Wooler
- Wylam First School, Wylam

=== Middle schools ===
- Bellingham Middle School & Sports College, Bellingham
- Berwick Middle School, Berwick-upon-Tweed
- Corbridge Middle School, Corbridge
- Dr Thomlinson CE Middle School, Rothbury
- Glendale Middle School, Wooler
- Hexham Middle School, Hexham
- Highfield Middle School, Prudhoe
- James Calvert Spence College, Amble
- Morpeth Chantry Middle School, Morpeth
- Morpeth Newminster Middle School, Morpeth
- Ovingham Middle School, Ovingham
- St Joseph's RC Middle School, Hexham
- Seaton Sluice Middle School, Seaton Sluice
- Tweedmouth Community Middle School, Spittal
- Whytrig Middle School, Seaton Delaval

=== Secondary and high schools ===
- Ashington Academy, Ashington
- Astley Community High School, Seaton Delaval
- Bede Academy, Blyth
- Bedlington Academy, Bedlington
- Berwick Academy, Spittal
- The Blyth Academy, Blyth
- Cramlington Learning Village, Cramlington
- The Duchess's Community High School, Alnwick
- Haydon Bridge High School, Haydon Bridge
- James Calvert Spence College, Amble
- The King Edward VI School, Morpeth
- NCEA Duke's Secondary School, Ashington
- Ponteland High School, Ponteland
- Prudhoe Community High School, Prudhoe
- Queen Elizabeth High School, Hexham
- St Benet Biscop Catholic Academy, Bedlington

=== Special and alternative schools ===
- Atkinson House School, Seghill
- Barndale House School, Alnwick
- Cleaswell Hill School, Guide Post
- Collingwood School & Media Arts College, Morpeth
- Cramlington Hillcrest School, Cramlington
- The Dales School, Blyth
- Gilbert Ward Academy, Blyth
- The Grove Special School, Tweedmouth
- Hexham Priory School, Hexham
- NCEA Castle School, Ashington
- Northumberland Pupil Referral Unit, Stannington

=== Further education ===
- Northumberland College

== Independent schools ==
=== Primary and preparatory schools ===
- Mowden Hall School, Newton

=== Senior and all-through schools ===
- Longridge Towers School, Berwick-upon-Tweed

=== Special and alternative schools ===
- Buzz Learning Independent Specialist School, Ashington
- Gust Independent School, Ashington
- Howard House School, Bedlington
- Nunnykirk Centre for Dyslexia, Nunnykirk
- Rosewood Independent School, Ashington

=== Further education ===
- Cambian Dilston College
