= Tyneside Passenger Transport Executive =

Tyneside PTE
- Tyneside Passenger Transport Executive

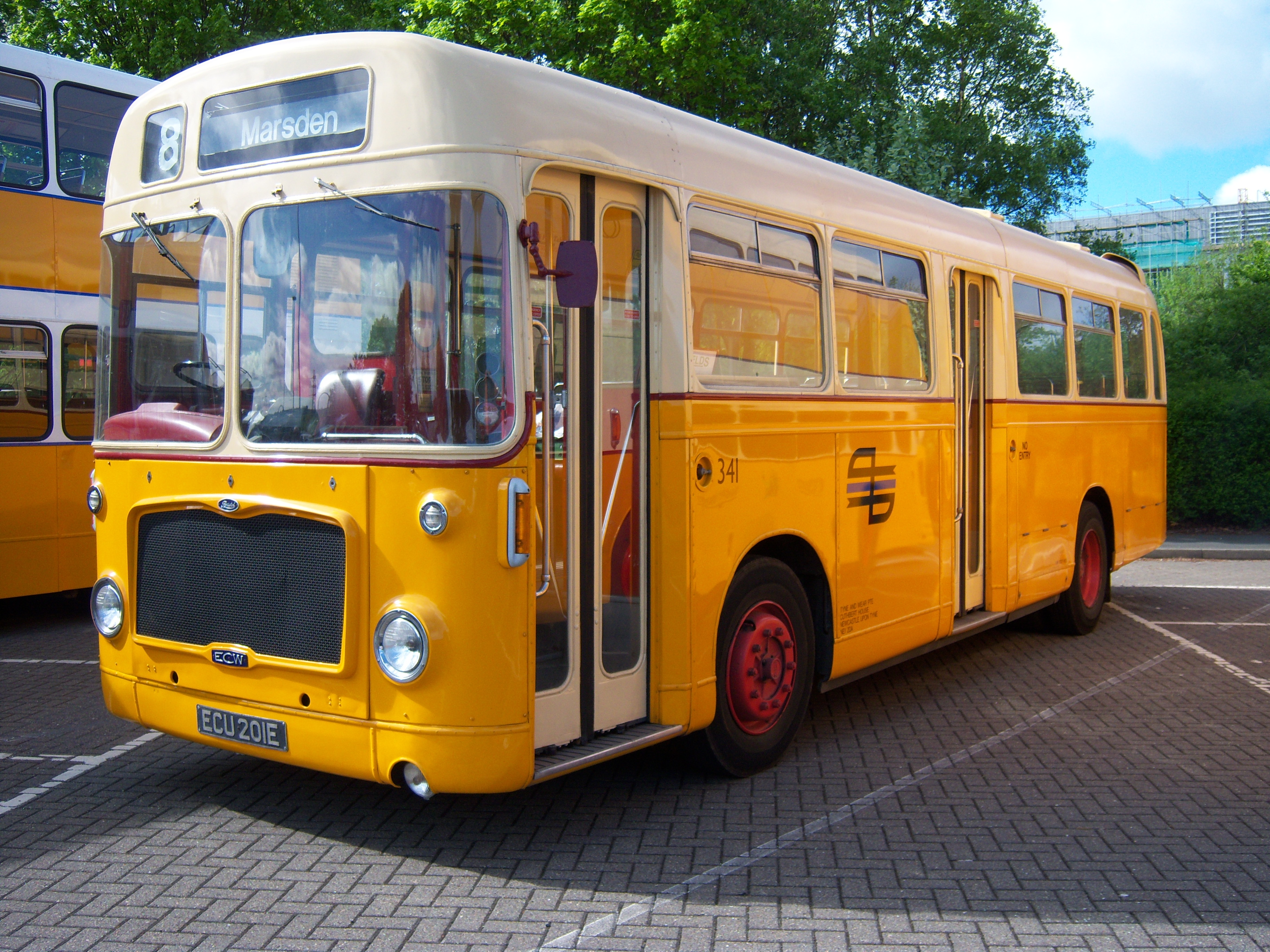
- Preserved bus wearing Tyneside PTE livery

Agency overview
- Formed: 1 January 1970
- Preceding agencies: Newcastle Transport; South Shields Transport; Sunderland Transport
- Dissolved: 31 March 1974
- Superseding agency: Tyne and Wear PTE
- Type: Passenger Transport Executive
- Jurisdiction: Parts of: Northumberland; County Durham
- Parent agency: Tyneside Passenger Transport Authority

The Tyneside Passenger Transport Executive was the operations arm of the Tyneside Passenger Transport Authority, created by the Transport Act 1968. and came into operation on 1 January 1970.

== Operations ==
Tyneside PTE took over the municipal bus operations of Newcastle Corporation and South Shields Corporation from 1 January 1970 and added those of Sunderland Corporation from 1 March 1973. It adopted a livery very similar to that used by Newcastle Transport.

In 1972, it took control of Market Place Ferry (now known as the Shields Ferry) crossing the River Tyne between North Shields and South Shields.

== Area covered ==
The original Tyneside PTE area in 1970, with the modern Tyne and Wear boundary overlaid on top.

The initial operating area of the PTE covered a number of local authority areas in south east Northumberland and north east County Durham.

From Northumberland:

- County Borough of Newcastle upon Tyne
- County Borough of Tynemouth
- Municipal Borough of Wallsend
- Municipal Borough of Whitley Bay
- Lonbenton Urban District
- Newburn Urban District
- Seaton Valley Urban District
- from Castle Ward Rural District, the civil parishes of
  - Brunswick
  - Dinnington
  - Hazlerigg
  - Heddon-on-the-Wall
  - North Gosforth
  - Ponteland
  - Woolsington
- from Hexham Rural District
  - Wylam civil parish

From County Durham:

- County Borough of Gateshead
- County Borough of South Shields
- Municipal Borough of Jarrow
- Blaydon Urban District
- Felling Urban District
- Hebburn Urban District
- Ryton Urban District
- Whickham Urban District

=== Later expansion ===
The expanded Tyneside PTE area from 1973, with the modern Tyne and Wear boundary overlaid on top.

On 1 March 1973, the PTE area expanded to include two new local authority areas.

From County Durham:

- County Borough of Sunderland
- Boldon Urban District

== Replacement ==
The Local Government Act 1972 created the metropolitan county of Tyne and Wear on 1 April 1974. As a result, the Tyneside Passenger Transport Authority was abolished, with the new Tyne and Wear County Council taking over responsibility for that role. The PTE's operating area was altered to coincide with that of the new county, changing to become the Tyne and Wear PTE.

=== Areas removed ===
Some places in the Tyneside PTE area were not included in the new county and thus were no longer part of a PTE area:

- from Castle Ward Rural District, the civil parishes of
  - Heddon-on-the-Wall
  - Ponteland

(which became part of Castle Morpeth district)

- from Hexham Rural District
  - Wylam civil parish

(which became part of Tynedale district)

- Seaton Valley Urban District was split, with three wards remaining in the new Tyne and Wear PTE area (as part of North Tyneside district). The remaining wards were not included in Tyne and Wear and became part of Blyth Valley district.

Wards removed from PTE area	Wards remaining in PTE area
Cramlington	Backworth
East Cramlington	Earsdon
Hartford	Shiremoor
Holywell	
New Hartley	
Newtown	
Seaton Delaval	
Seghill	

- the Municipal Borough of Whitley Bay was also split. Most of the borough formed part of North Tyneside district in Tyne and Wear. The northern section of the borough, the area around Seaton Sluice, was not included in Tyne and Wear and became part of Blyth Valley district.

=== Areas added ===
New areas were incorporated into Tyne and Wear and thus became part of the new Tyne and Wear PTE from 1 April 1974:

From County Durham:

- Hetton Urban District
- Houghton-le-Spring Urban District
- Washington Urban District
- from Chester-le-Street Rural District, the civil parishes of
  - Birtley
  - Harraton
  - Lamesley
  - South Biddick
