= Hartley, Northumberland =

Village in Northumberland, England

Coordinates: 55.073°N 1.477°W

Hartley
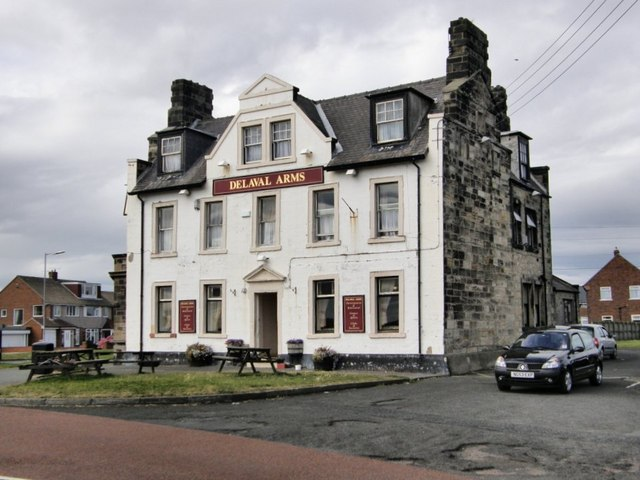
- Delaval Arms

- Location within Northumberland
- Population: 4,923
- OS grid reference: NZ335755
- Civil parish: Seaton Valley
- Unitary authority: Northumberland
- Shire county: Northumberland
- Region: North East
- Country: England
- Sovereign state: United Kingdom
- Post town: WHITLEY BAY
- Postcode district: NE26
- Police: Northumbria
- Fire: Northumberland
- Ambulance: North East

Hartley is a village and former civil parish, now in the parish of Seaton Valley in Northumberland, England. The village lies on the A193 road 4 miles (6 km) south of Blyth and 4 miles (6 km) north of Tynemouth. It was a farming and later colliery village but today is part of Seaton Sluice. However it has given its name to the ward of Hartley which covers Seaton Sluice and New Hartley. The population of this ward at the 2011 Census was 4,923. Hartley is sometimes called Old Hartley to distinguish it from New Hartley.

== History ==
The place-name 'Hartley' is first attested in the Pipe Rolls for 1167, where it appears as Hertelawa. The name means 'stag hill'. Hartley was formerly a township in the parish of Earsdon, from 1866 Hartley was a civil parish in its own right, on 1 April 1912 the parish was abolished and merged with Seaton Delaval and Monkseaton. In 1911 the parish had a population of 1688.

The Hartley Colliery disaster (also known as the Hartley Pit disaster or Hester Pit disaster) was a coal mining accident that occurred on 16 January 1862 and resulted in the deaths of 204 men and boys.

== Sources ==
- Christie, Rev James (1904). Northumberland: Its History, Its Features, and Its People (2nd ed.). Carlisle: Chas. Thurnam & Sons.
