= Seaton Valley Urban District =

Urban district in Northumberland, England

- Seaton Valley highlighted in Northumberland in 1971
- Area
  - 1961: 12,480 acres (50.5 km^{2})
  - Coordinates: 55.08°N 1.55°W
- Population
  - 1961: 26,095
- History
  - Preceded by: Cramlington Urban District; Earsdon Urban District; Seaton Delaval Urban District; Seghill Urban District
  - Origin: Local Government Act 1929
  - Succeeded by: Blyth Valley; North Tyneside
- Status: Urban district
- History
  - Established: 1 April 1935
  - Disestablished: 31 March 1974
- Contained within
  - County: Northumberland
  - Police force: Northumberland Constabulary
  - Passenger Transport Area: Tyneside PTE

Seaton Valley was an urban district in Northumberland, England, from 1935 to 1974, at which point it was split between the districts of North Tyneside and Blyth Valley.

It was created by a County Review Order in 1935 from various urban districts near the North Sea coast, particularly Cramlington, most of Earsdon, Seaton Delaval, and Seghill. Under the Local Government Act 1972 it was abolished on 1 April 1974, with the wards of Backworth, Earsdon and Shiremoor going to the borough of North Tyneside in Tyne and Wear, and the rest going to Blyth Valley in Northumberland.

After the abolition of Blyth Valley district in April 2009, a Seaton Valley parish was created in February 2009. The boundaries of this parish are not identical to the old urban district - excluding Cramlington but including the part of the former borough of Whitley Bay to be included in Blyth Valley in 1974 (Hartley and Seaton Sluice).
