= 1995 Blyth Valley Borough Council election =

1995 UK local government election

An election for the Blyth Valley Borough Council was held on 4 May 1995. The Labour Party won a majority of seats and therefore control of the council. The whole council was up for election, and turnout was 35.0%.

== Election result ==
Blyth Valley local election result 1995
Party	Seats	Gains	Losses	Net gain/loss	Seats %	Votes %	Votes	+/−
Labour	40					63.9		+18.6
Liberal Democrats	7					29.1		-11.8
Conservative	0				0.0	4.0		-5.0
Independent	0				0.0	2.2		+2.2
Other Parties	0				0.0	0.0		-2.4

== See also ==
- Blyth Valley Borough Council elections
