= Hartley Colliery disaster =

1862 mining disaster in England

- Drawing of the fractured cast iron beam, from the Illustrated London News, 1 February 1862
- Date: 16 January 1862
- Time: 10:30
- Location: New Hartley, Northumberland, England; 55°05′02″N 01°30′51″W
- Also known as: Hester Pit
- Type: Coal mine disaster
- Cause: Fracture of pumping engine beam
- Deaths: 204
- Property damage: Pit closed
- Burial: St Alban's Church, Earsdon
- Inquest: 21 January 1862, 4–6 February 1862
- Coroner: S Reed
- OS grid reference: NZ 31107 76720
- Led to a legal requirement for all mines to have at least two shafts

The Hartley Colliery disaster (also known as the Hartley Pit disaster or Hester Pit disaster) was a coal mining accident in Northumberland, England, that occurred on 16 January 1862 and resulted in the deaths of 204 men and boys. The beam of the pit's pumping engine broke and fell down the shaft, trapping the men below. The disaster prompted a change in British law that required all collieries to have at least two independent means of escape.

== Collieries ==
=== Hartley old pit ===
Hartley old pit was established in the coastal village of Hartley, Northumberland, (today part of Seaton Sluice) during the 13th century; the earliest existing records date from 1291. The colliery suffered increasingly from flooding as the seams were worked out under the sea and in 1760 the first atmospheric engine was installed, followed later by more powerful engines. Despite these efforts, the flooding became so severe that the old pit was abandoned in 1767.

=== Hester pit ===
Diagram of the Hester Pit, Hartley, Northumberland, in 1862 at the time of the disaster; the drawing is a simplified and corrected version of one that appeared in the Illustrated London News of 1862. C is the pump staple in which pump rods worked by a subsidiary beam operated. D is the worked out and abandoned high main seam. G is the location of the blockage above the yard seam and covering the end of the furnace drift. The vertical passage near H is the staple containing a wire ladder connecting the yard and low main seams.

The coal was sufficiently valuable that the following year a new shaft (A on the diagram) was sunk about 1 mile (1,600 m) inland. The low main seam (F) was reached on 29 May 1846. The colliery was called the New Hartley Colliery and the shaft the Hester Pit. (Note: A pit is a single shaft. A colliery (or mine) may be accessed by several pits, though not in this case.) Around the pit a new village grew up that was called New Hartley. Women and very young children (they had to be aged 10 or above) were not employed in the pit and, according to E. Raper (Social and Working Conditions in the village of New Hartley 1845–1900), this gave a higher standard of life for the miners: "the miner in New Hartley would return home after a hard day's work to a warm, clean, comfortable home and usually a substantial hot meal".

In common with many collieries of the period and locality, only one shaft was dug, which was of 12-foot (3.7 m) diameter, at a total cost of about £3,600. Coal, men, and materials travelled up and down the shaft, which also accommodated the pumps. In addition, the shaft provided the vitally important fresh air ventilation and extraction of firedamp.

In collieries with two or more pits (for instance see the description of Felling), one pit was the "downcast pit" down which fresh air travelled, the other the "upcast pit" up which spent air escaped. Within the colliery the air was forced to traverse the whole of the workings by the use of walls of coal left in place, stoppings (Note: A stopping is a partition made of wood, stone, or brick to block up a hole in a wall. Stoppings force the air to follow the desired route and not to take short cuts) and traps. (Note: A trap is a movable door in a stopping. The trap is opened for the passage of men and coal, but normally kept closed to force the air to follow the desired path) In this period, the normal means of creating the updraft needed was by using a furnace in the upcast pit.

With a single shaft colliery this simple arrangement could not be followed, and so a timber brattice (Note: A brattice is a partition (usually of timber) which seals off air flow) (B) was built from the top of the shaft to the bottom. Men and materials passed up and down on the downcast side, (Note: As with the term downcast pit, this implies that air is moving down this side) the pumps worked in the upcast. At Hartley a furnace was kept burning in the yard seam (E) with the rising hot gases passing up the furnace drift (Note: A drift is a tunnel leading to coal workings which is more horizontal than a shaft) (I) to join and draw foul air up the upcast side of the shaft.

The vulnerability of such an arrangement had already been identified and publicised before the colliery was sunk. An explosion at the St Hilda pit in South Shields in 1839 had led (as the result of a public meeting) to the formation of a committee to consider the prevention of accidents in mines. The Shields Committee issued their report in 1843; it had found that mines in the North-East were unnecessarily at risk of explosions because they were generally inadequately ventilated with too few shafts for the size of the underground workings (a view supported by evidence from George Stephenson, amongst others). The committee's report had specifically argued against the practice for all new works (which it thought Parliament should legislate against), of sinking a single shaft and sub-dividing it by bratticing to separate in- and out-flowing ventilation air (since any explosion destroying the bratticing would destroy the ventilation of the mine and ensure the death by asphyxiation of those underground). It was later estimated that sinking two 8.5-foot (2.6 m) shafts instead of one 12-foot (3.7 m) shaft would have cost an extra £900.

In 1852, the pit was flooded to a depth of 8 fathoms (48 ft; 15 m) by water from the old pit. A powerful steam engine, 'the largest in the county employed in mining purpose', was therefore installed in 1855 to operate pumps to recover the pit. Pumping began in September 1855 (in June 1856 the pumping engine was shown off to a visiting French prince) but two years later the pit was not yet in full production and advertised for sale as 'just reopened'.

The pumps were in three stages. The lowest stage lifted water from a sump connected to an adit (Note: A tunnel cut below a working tunnel for the purpose of collecting water, a drain) below the low main seam up to the yard seam. There, a second stage lifted the water up to a sump in the high main. The pumps were driven by a nominal 300 horsepower (220 kW) beam engine working the pumps directly: (Note: the largest pumping engine in the North of England. According to Gardiner & Smith 2001 it could raise 1,500 imperial gallons (6,800 L; 1,800 US gal) per minute; this is a good match to the pump dimensions (24 inches (610 mm) diameter bore,9.25 feet (2.82 m) stroke) and maximum stroke rate (8 to 8.5 per minute) stated at the inquest; The Illustrated London News 1862, p. 107 claimed a 400 horsepower (300 kW) engine lifting 180 tons of water per stroke and making five to six strokes per minute (equivalent to over 40,000 hp; presumably 180 imperial gallons (820 L; 220 US gal) per stroke was intended)) the first two stages were driven by the main beam, and the third stage by a subsidiary beam above the pump staple (C). (Note: A staple is a very small shaft) The pit was known as a wet pit and the engine (capable of nine to ten strokes a minute) normally ran at about seven strokes a minute to cope with the water ingress; on loss of pumping the low main would flood within little more than a day from seawater percolating through the roof of the seam from the North Sea above it. Three miners from Hartley were amongst the death toll of an explosion at Burradon in 1860 because (explained the Durham Chronicle) "little work has been doing at Hartley colliery lately owing to an accumulation of water".

At the time of the disaster, the high main had been worked out and was closed off; the yard seam was being worked, but only by a few men (and a pit pony); the workings in the low main seam at Hester Pit were being extended to meet those at the Mill Pit at Seaton Sluice; within the year it would have been possible to escape from Hester Pit via the Mill Pit. In the meantime, a staple was provided within which was a ladder; this allowed escape to the yard seam from the low main should there be a major inrush of water ("the only thing that was feared"). (Note: The fears were heightened because there were flooded workings in the low main in the direction of the Mill Pit. The staple was installed at the request/suggestion of the mines inspector : the connection to the Mill Pit was being pursued on the advice/urging not of the mines inspectorate, but of Thomas Emerson Forster, the viewer of the neighbouring (eight-shaft) Seaton Delaval Colliery, a leading mining engineer, vice president of the North of England Institute of Mining Engineers, and an advocate of multi-shaft working.)

== Disaster ==
On Thursday 16 January 1862 the fore shift went on duty at 02:30. At 10:30 the same morning the back shift were taking over from the fore shift, so most men of both shifts were at the coal face. As the first eight men were ascending, the beam of the pumping engine snapped and fell down the shaft. Although much of the brattice was destroyed, the first part seems to have deflected the beam away from the cage. Other debris fell on the cage, snapping two of the four support chains. Four of the eight men fell; the others managed to cling on. The beam came to rest jammed in the shaft and other falling debris created a blockage 30 yards (27 m) deep between the yard seam and the high main.

=== Rescue attempts ===
One of the deputies, Matthew Chapman, had been on his way home when he heard the crash. Retracing his steps he had himself lowered on a rope and started to clear away some of the debris with an axe. Realising that the man was exhausted, having just come off shift, the under-viewer Joseph Humble (Note: Responsible for the management of underground operations, but not for the engine, the pumps, or the maintenance of the shaft. One of the Carr brothers (owners of the pit) was their own viewer (overall manager). Humble (the great-great-great grandfather of television presenter Kate Humble) had done his time as a hewer; he had been the under-viewer for about four years. A nephew of his was trapped in the pit.) sent him home to rest whilst the main rescue effort was organised. (Note: As well as being the first man down, Chapman was one of the two longest lived survivors. On the fiftieth anniversary of the disaster, he was interviewed by Mr T Mason and his recollections formed the basis of Mason & Atkinson (1911).)

The initial rescue attempt was carried out under the direction of Humble, Carr (owner and viewer), G B Hunter (Cowpen & North Seaton), Hugh Taylor (Backworth) and Matthias Dunn (HM Inspector of Mines). By midnight rescuers had reached the damaged cage and George Sharp Snr was brought up in a rope sling. However, he jammed against some overhanging timbers, came out of the sling and fell to his death. The rescuers (including the by then rested Chapman) then descended the pump staple and lowered a rope sling from the high main. William Shape and Ralph Robinson were brought up from the cage in this manner. Thomas Watson, a Primitive Methodist local preacher, had earlier descended from the cage to the men who had fallen. (Note: One of them was his brother-in-law, according to Watson's own account; given to a Newcastle prayer meeting and reported in Evening Standard (1862b)) He remained with them to pray and comfort them until they died. Watson likewise ascended in a sling and was therefore the last man out alive.

With the pumps stopped, all knew that the low main would quickly flood. Those on the surface, therefore, assumed correctly that the men below would make their way via the staple up to the yard seam. Throughout the night men continued to work from ropes.

By 9 am. Friday the rescuers had removed the debris in the shaft (mostly timber from the brattice) to within about 5 fathoms (30 ft; 9.1 m) from the furnace drift, and thought they could hear noises from the men in the yard seam. They were then relieved by sinkers (Note: A sinker was responsible for the initial sinking of colliery shafts, including shoring up and lining the shaft.) from nearby pits. (Note: When medals were presented to 'the Hartley sinkers' later, there were 8 from North Seaton, 10 from Cowpen, 2 from Seaton Delaval, and 5 from Cramlington, in addition to Coulson and his men (11 including his son) who were on their way to sink a pit at Sleekburn, near Bedlington) William Coulson, the master sinker who had supervised the sinking of the shaft in 1845–46, was on a train passing through Hartley station on his way to another job. When passing through Newcastle that morning he had learnt of the accident; he sent a subordinate to see if assistance was needed. On offering his services, he was put in charge late on Friday afternoon, the previous committee yielding to his greater experience. (Note: Like Humble, he had a nephew trapped in the pit. When Coulson died in June 1865 he was 'in his 74th year' according to his obituary, which said of his efforts at Hartley "On his arrival there, without a moment's hesitation, when everyone seemed paralysed, he with his noble band of workmen, set to work with a zeal and determination rarely witnessed…" and (more generally, but clearly applicable to Hartley) that he was "much respected and beloved by his men; and such was their confidence in his judgement, they would unhesitatingly enter the most dangerous places in connection with their sinking operations" He told the inquest he had 'won' eighty-four collieries; roughly twenty of them had been single-shaft.)

There were occasional falls of rock from the sides of the shaft below the high main workings. By Saturday night, the rescuers were about 4 fathoms (24 ft; 7.3 m) above the furnace drift. At this depth the shaft crossed a 'trouble'; (Note: "A dislocation in a stratum; a fault (usu. small)" (amongst many other meanings): Shorter Oxford English Dictionary (3rd edition: 1983 Book Club Associates reprint)) when rubbish was removed below this there were massive rock falls, with the shaft expanding to up to 27 feet (8.2 m) across in some directions. It became necessary to timber up the sides to secure them before attempting to go lower in the shaft; this took about twelve hours. From Sunday morning onwards, a small hole was excavated through the fallen stone towards the furnace drift. As the men worked through the blockage they were inconvenienced by fumes of carbon monoxide from the upcast furnace and from measures it had ignited. When a small penetration was finally made (3 a.m. Tuesday) there was a release of noxious gas ('carbonic oxide' i.e. carbon monoxide) (Note: Carbon monoxide poisoning disrupts the supply of oxygen to the brain, causing symptoms ranging from flu-like effects (headaches, nausea, dizziness, and fatigue) to death.) rendering some of the rescuers speechless; the entire working party had to be rescued and within half an hour the gas had risen to 4 fathoms (24 ft; 7.3 m) above the high main.

To restart some ventilation a cloth brattice was rigged from the yard seam down to the work area. (Note: above the yard seam, the shaft acted as the downcast; the staple (connected to the furnace of a boiler on the surface) acted as the upcast) This was made from lengths of bratticing cloth held by various local collieries (Note: Further supplies (together with air tubing) were offered unprompted by the manufacturer, and forwarded by passenger train from Manchester, but it is unclear when they arrived) and was not complete until Thursday. On Wednesday morning, with the bratticing incomplete, George Emmerson (one of Coulson's sinkers sent to investigate if what remained of the pumps would collapse further if debris around them was removed) got three yards into the furnace drift before being forced back by the gas. He had seen an axe, saw and sawn timber, indicating that trapped miners had attempted to escape along that route; but the tools were rusty.

Carr felt able to reply to a telegram sent from Osborne House ("The Queen is most anxious to hear that there are hopes of saving the poor people in the colliery, for whom her heart bleeds") that there were still faint hopes of getting at least some of the men out alive, but these hopes were soon dashed. At the pit-head standers-by had expressed unease at the slow progress of the rescue operations. Two pitmen in their number (William Adams of Cowpen and Robert Wilson of Backworth) were invited to go down the pit and report back to their colleagues on how things stood; (Note: similar delegations had gone down previously; for example on Monday night) exceeding their instructions, they managed to enter the yard seam and found dead men.

Humble and a fellow-viewer (a Mr Hall from Trimdon) penetrated further and found all the miners dead, but on their return to the bank were severely affected by the gas. Others went down later but many became seriously affected by the gas: they reported (according to the 'Newcastle Journal') dead men in every direction, most near the shaft; most seemed to have died placidly: "The exploring parties have seen little boys in the arms of their fathers, and brothers sleeping dead in the arms of brothers". The dead pony was untouched; its corn bins had been emptied and some of the dead had corn in their pockets. Although the rescuers had thought they had heard signalling from the trapped men as late as Saturday night, the last entry in the notebook of the back overman described a prayer meeting held at 1.45 on Friday afternoon.

=== Recovery ===
The task was now recovery of bodies, and, the check-viewer told the waiters at the pit-head, it was no good throwing away the lives of living men to obtain the bodies of dead men: further entries into the yard seam were suspended until the canvas bratticing was completed, and the shaft properly timbered and cleared further to allow the yard seam to be accessed directly, rather than via the furnace drift. The following day, the Journal reported ugly scenes at the pithead, with demands that the bodies be retrieved immediately; conversely, the workers in the shaft were becoming more reluctant to run the risk of the continuing rockfalls. On Friday, the rubbish in the shaft fell away to below the entrance to the yard seam, but rockfalls and releases of gas continued.

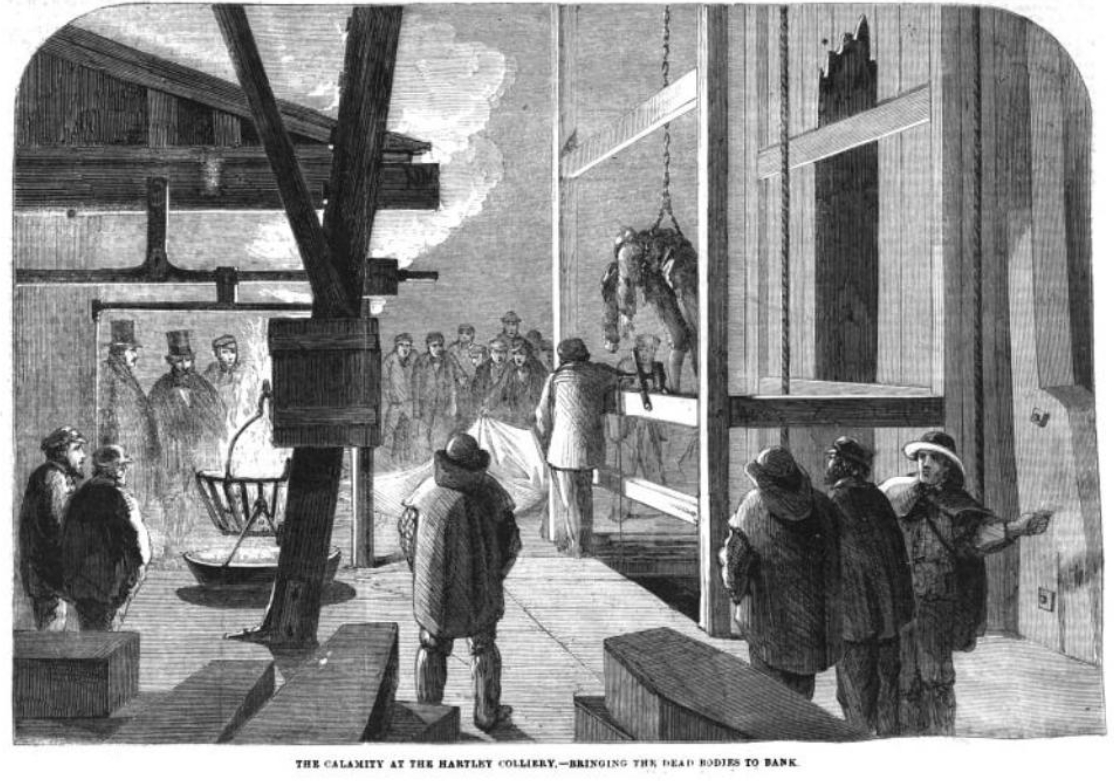
The calamity at the Hartley Colliery, bringing the dead bodies to bank, Illustrated Times

By Saturday the works were complete and the sinkers and shaftmen withdrawn. The victims had been dead a week and so the bodies were "considerably swollen and disfigured" and the smell from them offensive. It had been intended to put them into coffins while they were still down the mine, and the medical profession thought it unwise to allow the coffins to lie in the victims' homes until burial. In the event, the corpses were raised to the pit head to be identified as far as possible by the tally-boy, sprinkled with chloride of lime, shrouded, and coffined. In the end, however, as each body was coffined it was either sent home or, if unidentified, chalked "unknown" and sent to the Primitive Methodist chapel for later identification. The Journal reporter described the consequent appearance of the village:

All the blinds were drawn; but, looking in at the open doors, we saw coffins in every house. In most instances, they lay upon the large bed, so characteristic of the pitman's dwelling … Sometimes the bed would not contain all the coffins; and then they were disposed on chairs beside it. And so we passed up the row, and saw two, and three, and four coffins all in one little room, till, at last, coming to the end house, we were appalled to see a perfect pile of them…; and looking round, we were informed that seven dead bodies lay in the cottage. In every house women were sitting by the fire nursing their grief; and strong men, pale and dejected, were visibly suffering from the reaction of the excitement of the past week.

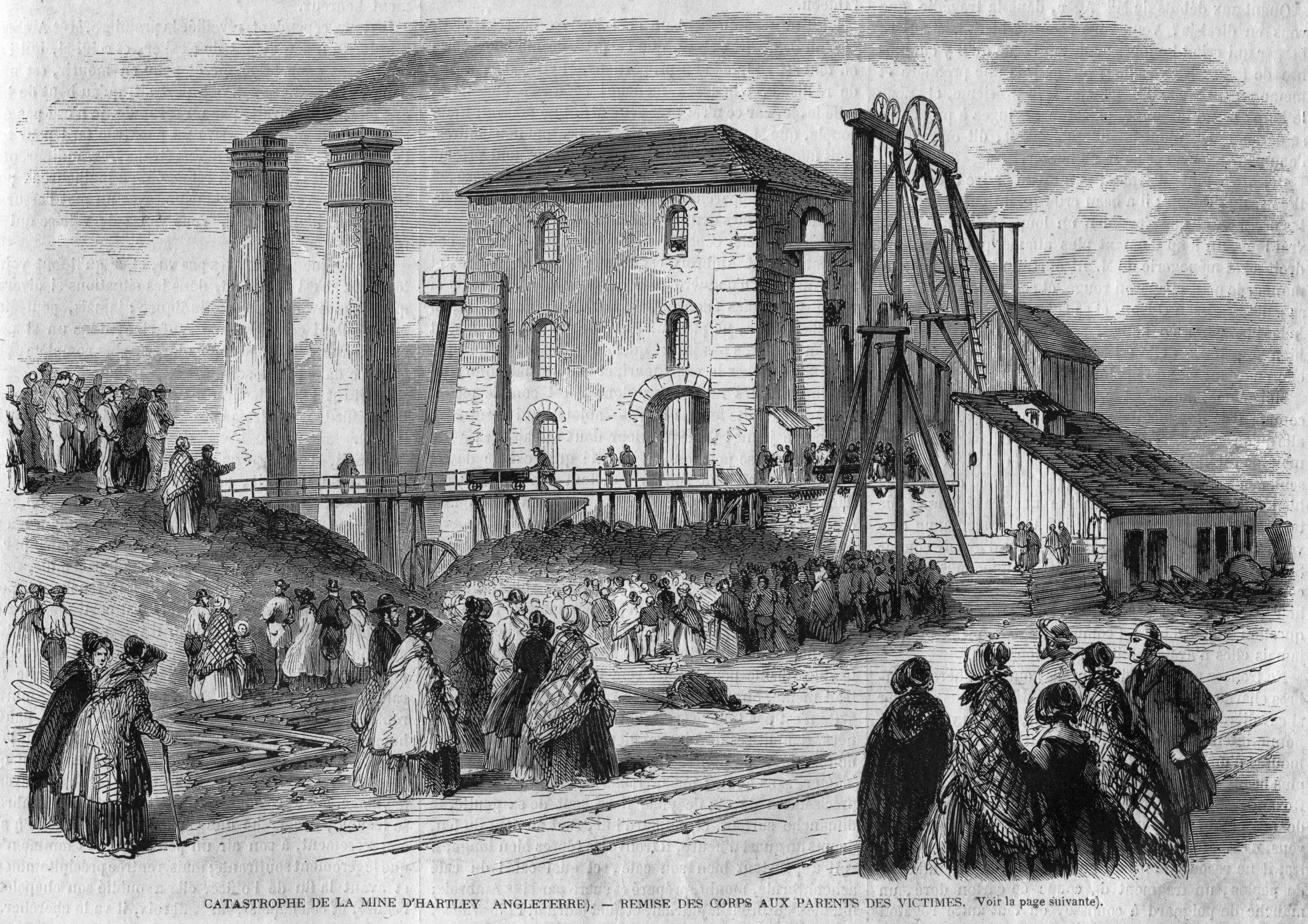
Hartley Colliery disaster: the dead are brought up to their families (L'llustration, 1862, p. 101)

The retrieval of bodies continued until four in the morning of Sunday; the yard seam was then checked thoroughly to ensure all bodies had been removed, and New Hartley and surrounding settlements canvassed to confirm that no body was missing. At one o'clock on the Sunday carts arrived at the cottages and most of the coffins were carried in procession to Earsdon Church. (Note: A number of the victims (eighteen according to the Morpeth Herald) were buried at "the Catholic chapel at Cowpen" the same day; nine or ten were buried at Cramlington, where they had family connections.) The graveyard was not large enough and more land was given by the Duke of Northumberland; a large number of graves suddenly needed were dug by men from Seaton Delaval colliery. Fifty men were employed in digging the graves, and they did not complete their task until well after interments started (at about one thirty); dusk was falling as the last coffin was buried.

A list was published of 'the workmen left alive that were employed at Hartley Colliery': there were only fifty-five. The loss of life was extreme, even by Victorian era coal mining standards, and remains one of the worst mining accidents in England.

=== Causes ===
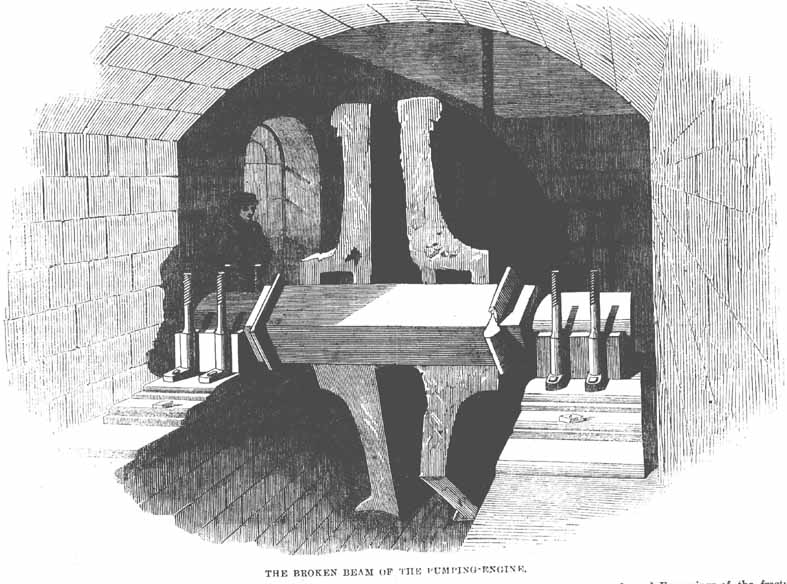
An engraving of a close view of the fractured beam

An inquest was held on Tuesday 21 January 1862 on the five men killed directly by the beam fall, but this heard little evidence, the coroner expecting a "more particular inquiry, should some of the rest not be got out alive". The enginemen reported what they had seen and heard when the beam failed; one also told of an incident during maintenance about a month previously. The beam had been lifted by hydraulic jacks from its centre bearing to allow the bearing brasses to be replaced. During this operation, the hydraulics had failed, and the beam had fallen. However it had fallen only 3 inches (76 mm), back into its bearings; the witness did not think so small a drop would have damaged the beam; he had not seen any damage to the beam, and the engine had run well until the beam failure. It was also noted that there were casting defects visible at the fracture surface.

As the coroner had foreseen, a second inquest was needed and was held 4–6 February 1862. Sir George Grey, the Home Secretary (to whom the Mining Inspectorate reported) sent an expert ((John) Kenyon Blackwell) to assist the coroner. Blackwell was to make a separate report on technical issues and was to use the inquest as an opportunity to collect information for his own report.

At the second inquest, a variety of experts and experienced men gave their opinions on the cause of the beam fracture. They differed over some details but were in general agreement that the 'spears' linking the engine beam to the pumps it was operating had failed in tension (some held that this had been triggered by a pump piston jamming; others held that the failure occurred simply because the spear was in poor condition). With the load on the beam removed, there had been an abnormally fast and large stroke and the beam had hit equipment on the 'in-house' (steam engine) side of the beam with great force; the shock loading causing brittle failure of the cast iron.

John Short, the engine-wright, gave the basic information about the engine, the beam, and the pump spears. (Note: He had been in post only ten weeks; in that time he had thought it desirable to change the beam bearings and had wanted to clean the pump sumps, which had not been cleaned for at least four years, according to Humble. Short's predecessor was neither examined nor named by the inquest.) The beam had been made nearby by Messrs Losh, Wilson and Bell of Walker. It had been assembled from three components. A central 'gudgeon' whose middle portion was hexagonal was threaded through a hexagonal hole in the central boss of two massive castings joined back-to-back with bolts, studs and spacers. Each casting had a thickness of 15 inches (380 mm) at the central boss, and 9 inches (230 mm) at the upper and lower edges with a web thickness of 4.75 inches (121 mm). The beam had an effective span of 34.5 feet (10.5 m); its greatest height was 8 feet (2.4 m) at the central boss; it weighed over 40 tons.

The spears ran as a single main dry spear of 14 inches (360 mm) square Memel pine to just above the high main. A 'Y' then connected the main spear both to the wet spear of the second stage pump and to the 10 inches (250 mm) square dry spear of the bottom pump. Coulson reported that the main spear had broken 12–14 feet below the bank; the bottom dry spear was broken at a 'spear plate' (junction piece) opposite the high main. From his examination, they had failed under tension (and therefore, he deduced, before the beam broke).

John Hosking (Note: The chief engineer of Hawks, Crawshay and Sons, who had executed the castings for Robert Stephenson's High Level Bridge; at that time he had been working for Stephenson on the project. Following the failure of Stephenson's bridge over the Dee, he had "carried out for Mr. Stephenson an elaborate series of experiments upon the strength of cast iron, which were published in the Commissioners' Report upon Railway Structures": he had also – he told the inquest – studied the failure of wood under tension.) gave expert evidence on the pump beam. He pointed to weakness in the beam design and its installation. There was too much metal in the central boss and in ribs, whose net effect was to weaken the beam. The orientation of the hexagonal holes (apexes at dead top and dead bottom) had both weakened the beam and given points from which a fracture could start. The beam had been secured on the gudgeon by driving wedges between them; from the hammer marks on the wedges, this seemed to have been done with excessive force, which would have introduced undesirably high local stress. It would have been better ('modern practice') to machine the central boss holes and the middle portion of the 'gudgeon' circular, with better engineered keying between beam and 'gudgeon'.

An ironfounder (Note: Thomas Clark; he had his own foundry and was also connected with the Elswick Ordnance works) considered the iron of good quality; its strength was demonstrated by the irregularity of the fracture surface, and its quality by the colour of the fracture surface when fresh. There was no undue contraction.

Hosking did not think a pump piston had wedged, the bottom spear had broken under normal load: "The wood does not appear to me to have been of very good quality. It might have been at one time, but is not now."

He dismissed as irrelevant two points which had attracted comment: (Note: The Morning Chronicle had accepted that the beam had broken because the engine had lost its load on spear breakage, but asserted that this had only happened because the previous drop had initiated a crack from a casting defect, that the crack would have been detected by inspection after the drop, and that therefore the viewers were culpable for returning the beam to duty)

- considerable voids (6 inches (150 mm) x 4 inches (100 mm)) could be seen at the fracture surface close to the central boss; they were shrinkage voids, to be expected with so massive a casting unless special precautions were taken, and would not significantly affect the strength of the beam. (Note: No reason was given for this reassurance, but the voids shown in the ILN illustrations are close to the beam's neutral axis. The word 'significantly' should be noted: his earlier criticism of 'too much metal' was expanded upon by other witnesses; shrinkage of unnecessary metal would lead to unnecessarily large shrinkage voids.)
- he did not think that the earlier drop had any connection with the subsequent failure: the beam had fallen only 3 inches (76 mm) which he thought insufficient to initiate any fracture; the drop had occurred 33 days before the beam failed – he did not think a significantly damaged beam would have survived so long; the fracture surface after the beam failure had been uniformly bright, which ruled out any slow progressive failure or partial previous failure.

Blackwell's report to Grey (written a week after the inquest) concurred with Hosking and drew attention to factors which Blackwell felt had made the accident more likely than for most pumping engines;

- at Hartley both 'inhouse up' and 'inhouse down' strokes were driven by the engine, whilst in the usual Cornish engine cycle for beam pumping engines, only the 'inhouse down' stroke was a power stroke, the return stroke being driven by the weight of the pump gear. On loss of load, therefore a Cornish engine would stall, whereas there was nothing to stop the Hartley engine over-speeding to its own destruction.
- all three stages of pumping were carried out by bucket pumps; to ensure the bottom stage could be mended if it failed and the mine flooded, it had to be a bucket pump, but the other stages should have been plunger pumps to lessen the normal load on the beam (Note: because lift pumps do the pumping work on the upstroke; force pumps on the downstroke)
- On bucket pumps heavy spears would add to the load on the pumping stroke; on plunger pumps heavy spears gave a quicker return stroke, and therefore there was always a tendency for bucket pumps to have less substantial spears.
- Even with equally substantial spears bucket pumps were more liable to break their spears (and hence 'lose the load') than plunger pumps; either by deformation of the piston, or by obstruction of water flow into the pump, and it had been proved that the sump at the bottom of the shaft at Hartley had not been cleaned for a considerable time.

== Aftermath ==
Told that all hope was lost, Queen Victoria (who was herself in mourning, having lost her husband, Prince Albert, only a month previously) sent a telegram of condolence, following it up by a letter: "Her Majesty commands me to say that her tenderest sympathy is with the widows and mothers and that her own misery only makes her feel the more for them". In her personal journal she recorded: "The accounts of the colliery accident are terrible, — such awful misery". The letter was read by clergy to the widows which was "a great comfort and a consolation to them".

=== Public response ===
The newspapers were struck not only by the misery of the widows, but by the Christian resignation of the victims, and the heroic determination of those attempting to rescue them: "Everyone must be struck by the good sense, the Christian principle, the intelligence, and bravery of many of the miners who have been brought into public notice by this disastrous event" said the Glasgow Morning Journal . Others were less restrained: "Peril, imminent and unexpected, is the position in which the grandeur of British character stands forth in its full proportions. Give a terrible and stupendous disaster – such a disaster as in some department of industrial enterprise almost every year brings us, and let British workmen be present in the scene, either as victims or spectators – and the consequence will invariably be an exhibition of noble daring, or magnificent fortitude, or unselfish devotion, such as it is impossible to obtain under other circumstances." thought the Athenaeum.

=== Medals and memorial ===
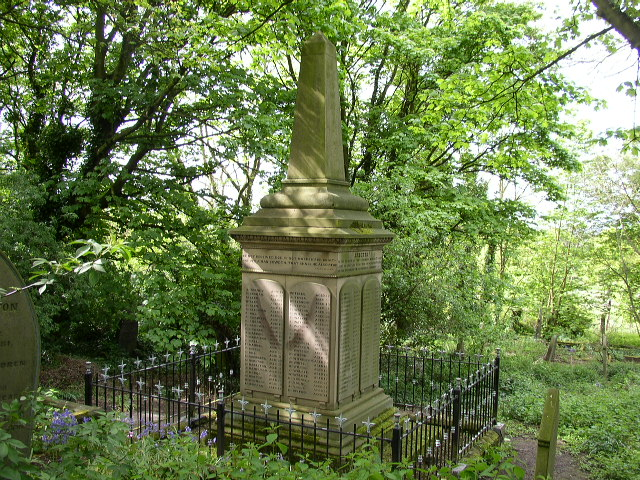
The obelisk in Earsdon churchyard in 2005

The heroism of the volunteers who attempted to rescue the victims was marked by a special medal, the Hartley Disaster Medal; it was struck in gold for Coulson and in silver for the sinkers, who were also given money in proportion to the hours they had spent in the shaft. An obelisk, commemorating those who died, was erected in the churchyard at St Alban's church in Earsdon.

=== Relief fund ===
The Queen's telegram of condolence, after expressing sympathy for the widows and orphans, had asked 'what is doing for them?'. An appeal was set up to raise enough money to save them from destitution; it was thought that the victims had left 407 dependents and that up to £20,000 would have to be raised to provide for them. (Note: There was no question of compensation from the mine-owners; the legal position was that those taking up employment did so knowing the risks, and they were reflected in the wages agreed with the employer.) The British public responded generously; despite attempts to persuade them to give instead to other worthwhile causes, £20,000 was raised in London alone; the total receipts of the Hartley Relief Fund came to £83,000. A fuller reckoning of dependents including 26 posthumous children brought their number up to 467, but even on the most pessimistic assumptions, only £55,000 was needed to provide for them, so in 1863 £20,000 was distributed between the districts covered by each mining inspector, to be administered by local committees and applied for the relief of suffering caused by colliery accidents. The money provided financial backing for the first miners' relief societies, providing insurance against death or injury, whether in a disaster or incidental to routine operations (in 1862 it was estimated that for every million tons of coal produced, fifteen miners had died). The Hartley Relief Fund was wound up in 1909; after buying annuities for the ten surviving dependents £13,000 was left and went to the Northumberland and Durham Aged Miners' Homes Associations; the accommodation built with the money was to bear a suitable inscription.

=== Pit ===
Hester pit was never reopened. In 1874 a new colliery consisting of the Hastings and Melton pits was sunk nearby. In 1901 the low main workings of the old Hester pit were reentered, having been drained by a powerful pump. From 1929 onwards a series of takeovers and modernisations occurred until eventually in 1947 the new National Coal Board took over. The gradual decline followed with the whole colliery being abandoned in 1959, leaving a further 70 years' (at peak production) worth of coal below ground.

=== Legislation ===
The inquest verdict was returned on 6 February 1862 and was 'accidental death' with riders including:

The jury cannot close this painful inquiry without expressing their strong opinion of the imperative necessity that all working collieries should have at least a second shaft or outlet, to afford the workmen the means of escape should any obstruction take place, as occurred at the New Hartley Pit; and that in future the beams of colliery engines should be made of malleable metal.

However, giving evidence, a prominent mining engineer, Thomas Emerson Forster, had given as his opinion that "Parliament should pass an act this session" requiring two shafts, but that the materials used in colliery engines "might be left to the people who put up the engines. I myself think there will be no more cast-iron beams" and this view prevailed.

On 7 August 1862, just six months after the inquest and less than seven months from the disaster, an Act of Parliament (the Act to Amend the Law Relating to Coal Mines of 1862) was passed. This required all new mines to have two shafts and all existing mines to ensure access to a second shaft before the end of 1864; the maximum penalty was £10, but the prohibition was enforceable by injunction. There was no similar legislation to outlaw the use of cast-iron beams in colliery pumping engines, but malleable iron beams became the rule in new installations. An 1863 paper describing a new pumping engine at Clay Cross noted that initially a cast-iron beam had been intended; after the New Hartley accident a wrought-iron beam was specified instead, adding £480 to the cost of the engine (£3130 excluding boiler, engine house and pumps).
