= Brattice =

Partition used to ventilate a mineshaft

A brattice is a partition used in mining. It is built between columns of a sub-surface mine to direct air for ventilation. Where the mine is sunk at the base of a single shaft, the shaft is divided into two parts by a wooden or metal brattice. Air is delivered down one side of the shaft and exhausted upwards through the other.

Depending on the type of mine and how the operation is run, brattices can be permanent (concrete or wood) or temporary (cloth). Temporary installations are also called curtains.

Early collieries sometimes only had one pit which was divided by a brattice. A furnace was kept burning within the pit and the hot air rose up the one side of the brattice (the upcast side) drawing cold air down the other (the downcast side). One such pit was Hartley pit. In 1862 the beam of the pumping engine failed and brought down part of the lining resulting in the pit being blocked. All the men trapped underground died from carbon monoxide poisoning as a consequence of the lack of ventilation. As a result, an Act of Parliament was passed later in the year requiring all collieries to have at least two shafts. Rather than bratticing one shaft, it was more convenient to use one shaft as the upcast pit and the other as the downcast pit. Underground however, brattices remained vitally important for directing the current of air throughout the whole of the colliery.

In an 1868 article titled "Coal" in the All the Year Round periodical, the author describes the workings of a ventilation shaft in a mine and a brattice:

Changes from gusty windiness to tropical heat are sudden. Lifting a coarse canvas curtain, and passing under it, takes us at once from Siberia to the torrid zone. In the first we are among vast currents of air coming fresh and cold into the pit; in the second we stand amid hot and exhausted air which is being forced outwards by the furnace. Canvas or "brattice-work" divides the two, and the vast labyrinthian passages along which coal has been or is being worked are cold or hot according to the turn the ventilation has been made to take.

— Anonymous, All the Year Round, Volume XIX, Page 328

== Etymology ==
Brattice, from the French bretèche, originally referred to part of a castle. This was a small wooden structure, sometimes temporary, that projected out beyond the main part of a castle wall, so as to give flanking fire along that wall while still offering some degree of protection. See hoarding.

== See also ==
- Glossary of coal mining terminology
