= Billy Wilson (footballer, born 1946) =

English footballer (1946–2018)

Personal information
- Full name: William Wilson
- Date of birth: 10 July 1946
- Place of birth: Seaton Delaval, England
- Date of death: 22 February 2018 (aged 71)
- Position: Full back

Youth career
- 1961–1963: Blackburn Rovers

Senior career*
Years	Team	Apps	(Gls)
1964–1972	Blackburn Rovers	247	(0)
1972–1979	Portsmouth	193	(5)
- * Club domestic league appearances and goals

William Wilson (10 July 1946 – 22 February 2018) was an English footballer (soccer player) who played professionally in England for 15 years before retiring to run The Pompey public house just outside Fratton Park. Born in Seaton Delaval on 10 July 1946 Wilson was a tough tackling left back who made nearly 250 league appearances for the Ewood Park club. An ever-present during their 1967-68 and 69-70 campaigns he was part of a close knit defence.

In January 1972 he moved to Portsmouth F.C for £25,000 and promptly scored his first league goal. He was to be a regular for four seasons (albeit a somewhat unconventional one) until he lost his place to Keith Viney during the 1976/77 campaign, after which he was very much more of a squad player.

He died on 22 February 2018 at the age of 71.
