= William Coulson (mining engineer) =

Mining engineer

William Coulson (1791–1865) was a mining engineer and master shaft sinker who was responsible for sinking more than 80 mine shafts in North East England along with others in Prussia and Austria. He was also notable for leading the rescue and recovery team after the Hartley Colliery disaster of 1862.

== Early life ==
William Coulson was born in 1791 in Gateshead to William and Barbara Coulson. His father was a pitman at Eighton Banks Colliery. William began work at about 8 years old as a trapper boy spending twelve hours underground opening and closing a door to enable the ventilation system to function properly. He progressed to work as a putter, hewer, borer and blacksmith at various collieries on Tyneside. Apparently after an eight-hour shift as a hewer in a Newcastle colliery, Coulson then travelled to a pit south of the river to work as a collier trimmer in order to augment his income.

== The sinker ==
In about 1812 he began as an independent mining contractor with a contract for winning coals at Thornley Colliery in County Durham - he was said to work sixteen hours of the 24 in a day. A few years later he started sinking shafts, with one of the first being at Whitley Colliery in Northumberland. In 1820 he made his name as part of a team at Hetton Colliery trying to drive a shaft through the magnesian limestone plateau to determine if there was coal underneath. Earlier attempts by others had failed. Below the plateau the team encountered water flowing at up to 150 litres/second. Coulson overcame this problem by improving the traditional iron tubbing that lined the shaft with four wedging cribs to hold back water, as well as developing piping systems to drain off water and vents to ease gas pressure. The team reached the High Main and Hutton seams, so marking the beginning of the development of the East Durham coalfield and the movement to large collieries employing perhaps hundreds of men.

For the next 40 years Coulson led shaft sinking operations mainly in the Great Northern Coalfield. His team of master sinkers included his brother Frank and his three of his sons: William, Robert and James. In the early 1850s he worked in Wales (with the Cardiff and Newport Colliery and Ironstone Co) and Lancashire and following these activities his team was recruited by the Irish surveyor and entrepreneur William Thomas Mulvany to open up the Ruhr coalfield. Work began on the Hibernia mine in Gelsenkirchen on St. Patrick's Day in 1855 followed by the Shamrock mine later that year, then the Erin colliery in Herne. In total, he sank five shafts in Prussia. There were also explorations for coal in Portugal.

His son Robert worked in mines in Singapore, Borneo and Siam in the 1850s and 1860s and his father supplied some of the workforce for these mines. His son William, took over the Crossgate Foundry in Durham that manufactured iron tubbing. In 1866 the company was absorbed into the Grange Iron Company developing the manufacture of mining and other equipment.

== Hartley Colliery disaster ==
Coulson is most remembered for his attempt to rescue the 199 men entombed in New Hartley Colliery. On 16 January 1862, the 42 ton beam of the pumping engine snapped in half and crashed down the shaft sealing the only entrance into the mine – the shaft sunk by Coulson in 1845.

Coulson was on his way by train to another colliery for a job when he heard of the disaster, so went to the colliery where he took charge of the rescue attempt. With his son William and his team of sinkers, Coulson - then 70 years old - led the rescue team as they worked tirelessly for days moving debris and coping with noxious gases so as to reach the trapped miners. Unfortunately by the time they did the men had all suffocated. Coulson and his men then made the mine safe before the bodies could be removed. In recognition of their efforts following a public subscription Coulson received a gold medal, his men silver medals and all were given a purse of gold.

== Family ==
He married Anne Dobson at St. Mary's Church in Gateshead on 11 July 1812. They had 7 children: Anne (1813), William (1816), Robert (1818), Dorothy (1822), James (1824), Dobson (1826) and Barbara (1828). He later remarried.

== Death ==
Coulson died on Monday 12 June 1865 after suffering a stroke when visiting his friend the eminent mining engineer Nicholas Wood for a business meeting.

An obituary noted: "Mr Coulson was much respected and beloved by his men; and such was their confidence in his judgment, that they would unhesitatingly enter the most dangerous places in connection with his sinking operations" and a recent article concluded that Coulson was "a man who by his careful observation, deduction, ingenuity and perseverance had transformed shaft sinking into the engineering discipline it has remained to this day"

== Main sources ==
- Celebrities of the city and county by a local historian: William Coulson, master sinker Durham County Advertiser 27 June 1873, 6
- Lancaster, Bill The making of the modern world: the history of the North of England Institute of Mining and Mechanical Engineers. Volume 1: 1852–1914. The Common Room of the Great North, 2021, 82–95
- Turnbull, Les. Hidden treasures [Bicentenary of the winning of Hetton Lyons Colliery]. North of England Institute of Mining and Mechanical Engineers, 2021.
