= Blyth Valley =

Coordinates: 55.127°N 1.523°W

- Former district and borough
- Shown within Northumberland
- Sovereign state: United Kingdom
- Constituent country: England
- Region: North East England
- Administrative county: Northumberland
- Founded: 1 April 1974
- Abolished: 1 April 2009
- Admin. HQ: Blyth

Government
  - Type: Blyth Valley Borough Council
  - Leadership: Leader & Cabinet
- Time zone: UTC+0 (Greenwich Mean Time)
  - Summer (DST): UTC+1 (British Summer Time)
- ONS code: 35UD
- Website: blythvalley.gov.uk

Blyth Valley was a local government district with borough status in south-east Northumberland, England, bordering the North Sea and Tyne and Wear. The two principal towns were Blyth and Cramlington. Other population centres include Seaton Delaval, and Seaton Sluice.

The borough was formed on 1 April 1974 by the merger of the borough of Blyth, part of Seaton Valley urban district and part of the borough of Whitley Bay. The district had a resident population of 81,265 according to the 2001 census

The district council was abolished as part of the 2009 structural changes to local government in England effective from 1 April 2009 with responsibilities being transferred to Northumberland County Council, a unitary authority.

== Settlements and parishes ==
The borough contained the parishes of:

- Blyth
- Cramlington
- Seaton Valley

== See also ==
- Blyth Valley Borough Council elections
