= Blyth Valley Borough Council elections =

Local government elections in Northumberland, England

Blyth Valley Borough Council elections were generally held every four years between the council's creation in 1974 and its abolition in 2009. Blyth Valley was a non-metropolitan district in Northumberland, England. The council was abolished and its functions transferred to Northumberland County Council with effect from 1 April 2009.

== Political control ==
The first election to the council was held in 1973, initially operating as a shadow authority before coming into its powers on 1 April 1974. From 1974 until its abolition in 2009 political control of the council was as follows:

Party in control	Years
Labour	1974–1976
No overall control	1976–1979
Labour	1979–1987
SDP–Liberal Alliance	1987–1988
Social and Liberal Democrats	1988–1989
Liberal Democrats	1989–1991
Labour	1991–2009

== Council elections ==
- 1973 Blyth Valley Borough Council election
- 1976 Blyth Valley Borough Council election
- 1979 Blyth Valley Borough Council election (New ward boundaries)
- 1983 Blyth Valley Borough Council election
- 1987 Blyth Valley Borough Council election
- 1991 Blyth Valley Borough Council election (New ward boundaries)
- 1995 Blyth Valley Borough Council election (Borough boundary changes took place but the number of seats remained the same)
- 1999 Blyth Valley Borough Council election (New ward boundaries)
- 2003 Blyth Valley Borough Council election
- 2007 Blyth Valley Borough Council election

== Results maps ==
2003 results map

2007 results map

== By-election results ==
=== 1995-1999 ===
Plessey By-Election 16 May 1996
Party	Candidate	Votes	%	±%
Independent		503	46.3	
Labour		450	41.3	
Liberal Democrats		98	9.0	
Conservative		36	3.3	
Majority		53	5.0	
Turnout		1,087		
Independent gain from Labour		Swing		

Newsham & New Delaval By-Election 19 June 1997
Party	Candidate	Votes	%	±%
Labour		396	52.5	−7.6
Liberal Democrats		333	44.2	+8.7
Conservative		25	3.3	−1.1
Majority		63	8.3	
Turnout		754	20.7	
Labour hold		Swing		

Cramlington East By-Election 23 April 1998
Party	Candidate	Votes	%	±%
Labour		438	70.2	−15.0
Liberal Democrats		96	15.4	+0.6
Independent		55	8.8	+8.8
Conservative		35	5.6	+5.6
Majority		342	54.8	
Turnout		624	18.8	
Labour hold		Swing		

Parkside By-Election 16 July 1998
Party	Candidate	Votes	%	±%
Liberal Democrats		350	35.2	−13.7
Conservative		339	34.2	+23.2
Labour		303	30.5	−10.4
Majority		11	1.0	
Turnout		992	16.6	
Liberal Democrats hold		Swing		

=== 1999-2003 ===
Cowpen By-Election 13 April 2000
Party	Candidate	Votes	%	±%
Labour		285	55.4	−18.3
Liberal Democrats		190	37.0	+10.7
Conservative		39	7.6	+7.6
Majority		95	18.4	
Turnout		514	14.7	
Labour hold		Swing		

Croft By-Election 27 September 2001
Party	Candidate	Votes	%	±%
Liberal Democrats		317	54.3	+32.5
Labour		242	41.4	−26.2
Conservative		25	4.3	−6.3
Majority		75	12.9	
Turnout		584	16.0	
Liberal Democrats gain from Labour		Swing		

Plessey By-Election 27 September 2001
Party	Candidate	Votes	%	±%
Labour		319	45.8	+8.5
Independent		301	43.2	−19.5
Liberal Democrats		60	8.6	+8.6
Conservative		16	2.3	+2.3
Majority		18	2.6	
Turnout		696	17.3	
Labour gain from Independent		Swing		

Cramlington East By-Election 25 October 2001
Party	Candidate	Votes	%	±%
Labour		431	75.0	+1.6
Independent		70	12.2	+12.2
Liberal Democrats		42	7.3	−19.3
Conservative		32	5.6	+5.6
Majority		361	62.8	
Turnout		575	13.5	
Labour hold		Swing		

=== 2003-2007 ===
Cowpen By-Election 23 September 2004
Party	Candidate	Votes	%	±%
Labour	Grant Davey	764	69.0	+1.1
Liberal Democrats	Peter Hampton	226	20.4	−11.7
Conservative	Patricia Holt	118	10.6	+10.6
Majority		538	48.6	
Turnout		1,108	32.5	
Labour hold		Swing		

Cramlington Village By-Election 23 September 2004
Party	Candidate	Votes	%	±%
Liberal Democrats	Barrie Crowther	702	44.2	+13.7
Labour	Ian Ayres	622	39.2	−3.2
Conservative	Brian Pickering	263	16.6	−10.6
Majority		80	5.0	
Turnout		1,587	41.8	
Liberal Democrats gain from Labour		Swing		

Cramlington North By-Election 4 May 2006
Party	Candidate	Votes	%	±%
Conservative	Brian Pickering	929	63.7	+30.3
Liberal Democrats	Geoffrey Wilkin	342	23.4	+10.6
Labour	Trevor Ambrose	188	12.9	−1.2
Majority		587	40.3	
Turnout		1,459	34.9	
Conservative hold		Swing		

Hartley By-Election 26 October 2006
Party	Candidate	Votes	%	±%
Labour		413	39.0	−9.1
Liberal Democrats	Anita Romer	361	34.1	+16.5
Conservative		285	26.9	−7.3
Majority		52	4.9	
Turnout		1,059	27.2	
Labour hold		Swing		

=== 2007-2009 ===
Croft By-Election 10 July 2008
Party	Candidate	Votes	%	±%
Labour		439	48.1	−8.9
Independent		266	29.1	+29.1
Liberal Democrats		176	19.3	−7.0
Conservative		32	3.5	−13.2
Majority		173	18.9	
Turnout		913		
Labour hold		Swing		
