= Seaton Valley High School =

Location
- Prospect Avenue; Seaton Delaval; Northumberland, NE25 0DN; England
- Coordinates: 55.0749°N 1.5248°W

Information
- Type: Community school
- Local authority: Northumberland
- Department for Education URN: 122374 Tables
- Ofsted: Reports
- Head of School: Richard Goodman
- Executive Headteacher: Jon Barnes
- Gender: Co-educational
- Age: 13 to 18
- Enrolment: 561 as of 2023
- Capacity: 821 as of 2023
- Colours: Blue
- Website: svf.org.uk/seaton-valley-high-school

Seaton Valley High School, formerly known as Astley Community High School until 2025, is a coeducational upper school (styled high school) and sixth form located in Seaton Delaval in the English county of Northumberland.

It is a community school administered by Northumberland County Council, and admits pupils from Seaton Valley, particularly those graduating from Whytrig and Seaton Sluice Middle Schools. In September 2025, a new relocated campus was built in the north of the town on Prospect Avenue as a shared campus with Whytrig Middle School. At the start of the 2025-26 academic year, the name of the school was renamed from Astley Community High School to Seaton Valley High School.

Seaton Valley High School offers GCSEs and BTECs as programmes of study for pupils, while students in the sixth form have the option to study from a range of A-levels and further BTECs. The school also offers the Duke of Edinburgh's Award programme.
