= Coquet Community School =

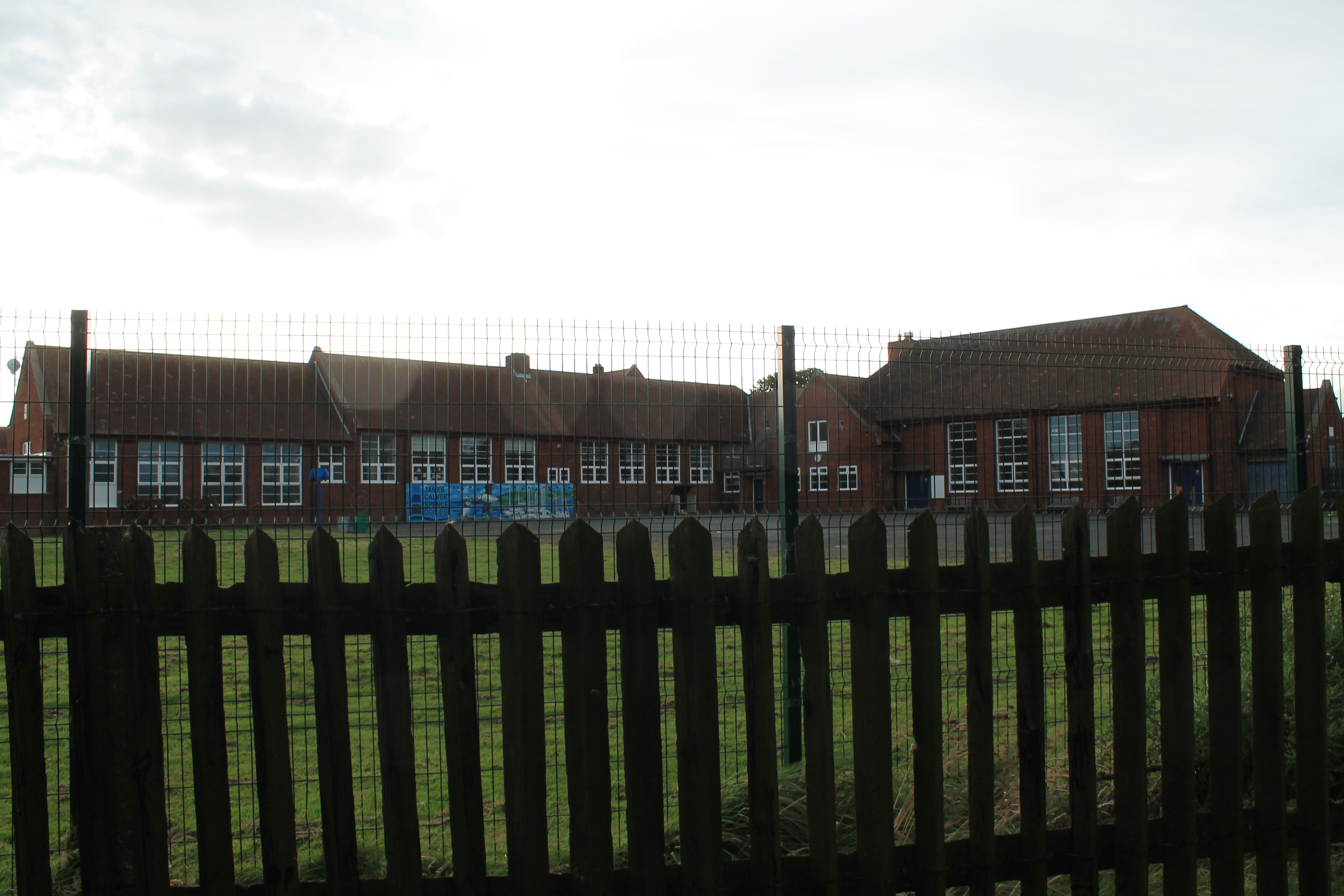
- Coquet Community School

Location
- Acklington Road; Amble; Northumberland; England; 55.328416°N 1.590473°W

Information
- Type: Community school
- Local authority: Northumberland
- Department for Education URN: 122363 Tables
- Ofsted: Reports
- Executive Headteacher: James Andriot
- Gender: Coeducational
- Age: 10 to 18
- Enrolment: 733 as of January 2025
- Website: http://www.ccsamble.co.uk/

Coquet Community School is a coeducational community school and sixth form located in Amble in the English county of Northumberland. Until September 2026, the school was known as James Calvert Spence College - being named after Sir James Calvert Spence, a decorated war hero and paediatrician.

The school was formed in 2011 following the merger of Amble Middle School, Druridge Bay Community Middle School and Coquet High School, originally serving 2 sites: South Avenue and Acklington Road, where South Avenue served as a middle school and Acklington Road a secondary school. The school is administered by Northumberland County Council and has an intake of pupils from Acklington, Amble, Broomhill, Hadston, Red Row, Warkworth and Widdrington.

On 23 September 2026, a new £47 million replacement 'super school' officially opened, replacing the existing James Calvert Spence College buildings.

Coquet Community School offers GCSEs and BTECs as programmes of study for pupils, while students in the sixth form have the option to study from a range of A-levels, further BTECs and T-Levels.
