= Seghill =

Village in Northumberland, England

Coordinates: 55.06°N 1.56°W

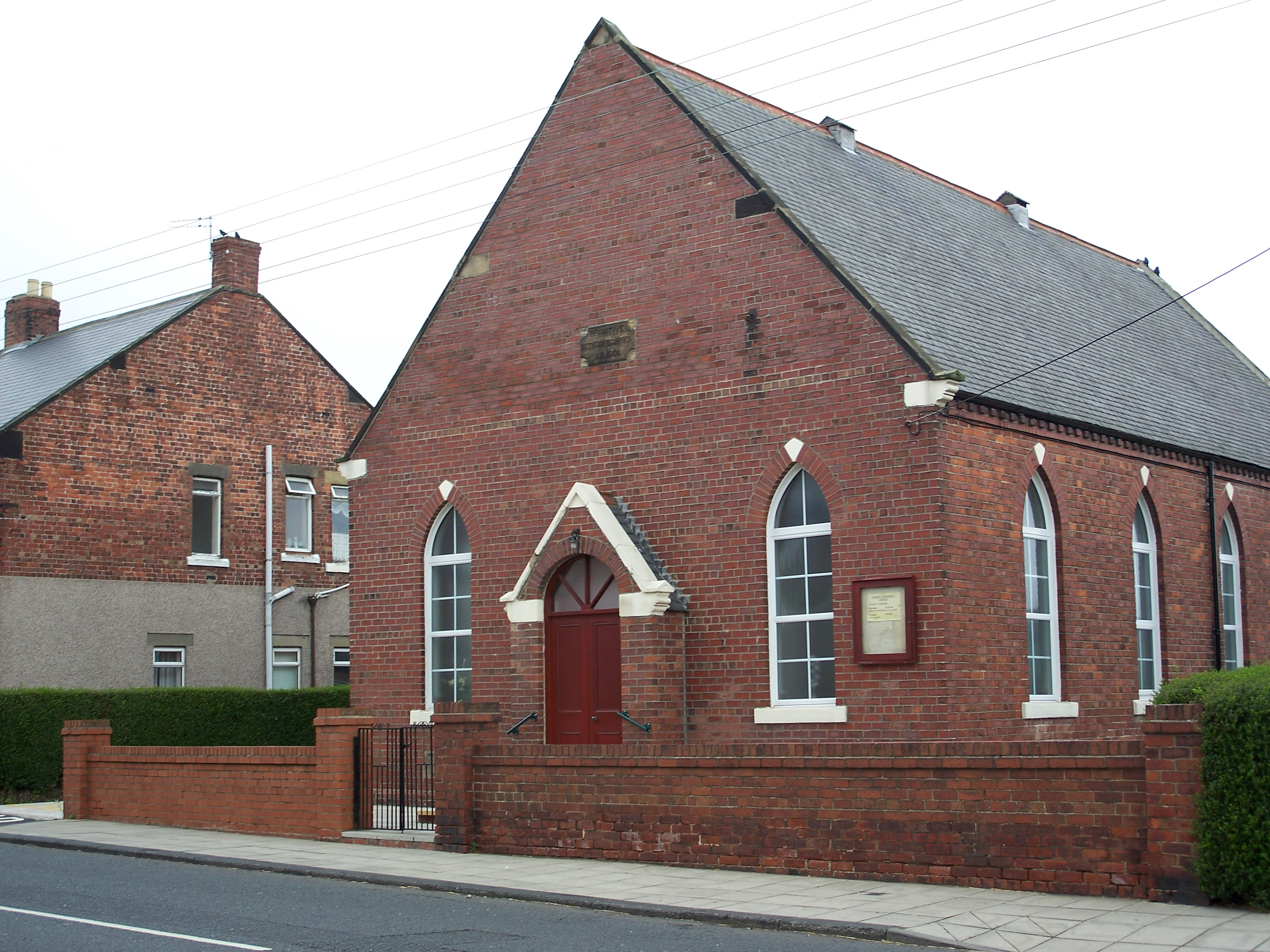
- Seghill Primitive Methodist Church

- Location within Northumberland
- Population: 2950
- OS grid reference: NZ285745
- Civil parish: Seaton Valley
- Unitary authority: Northumberland
- Ceremonial county: Northumberland
- Region: North East
- Country: England
- Sovereign state: United Kingdom
- Post town: CRAMLINGTON
- Postcode district: NE23
- Dialling code: 0191
- Police: Northumbria
- Fire: Northumberland
- Ambulance: North East
- UK Parliament: Cramlington & Killingworth

Seghill is a large village in the civil parish of Seaton Valley, located on the Northumberland, border which is the county boundary between Northumberland and Tyne and Wear, England. Seghill is situated between the villages of Seaton Delaval and Annitsford, about 8 miles (13 km) north of Newcastle upon Tyne.

== History ==
Seghill was formerly a township in the parish of Earsdon, from 1866 Seghill was a civil parish in its own right, on 1 April 1935 the parish was abolished to form Seaton Valley. In 1931 the parish had a population of 2582.

== Economy ==
Seghill used to be a busy pit village within the Northumberland Coalfield. Seghill Colliery was closed during the so-called Robens era, on 28 September 1962. The folk song "Blackleg Miner" originates from the area and contains the lyric:

Divint gan near the Seghill mine
Across the way, they stretch a line
To catch the throat and break the spine
Of the dirty blackleg miner.

The song was written during the 1844 lockout of coal miners. Many of the striking miners were evicted from their homes in Seghill during this dispute. Thomas Burt wrote of the situation:

the very magnitude of the evictions, extending over nearly the whole of the mining districts of Northumberland and Durham, made it impossible to find house accommodation for a twentieth part of the evicted. Scores of the Seghill families camped out by the roadside between that village and the Avenue Head.

== Transport ==
Seghill was served by a railway station, but it was closed in November 1964 along with the rest of the passenger services on the Blyth & Tyne route north of Backworth. It still has a level crossing which sees the occasional goods train. Since 2024 the line has been reopened (without Seghill station re-opening) as the Northumberland line running from Ashington to Newcastle central station.

== Education ==
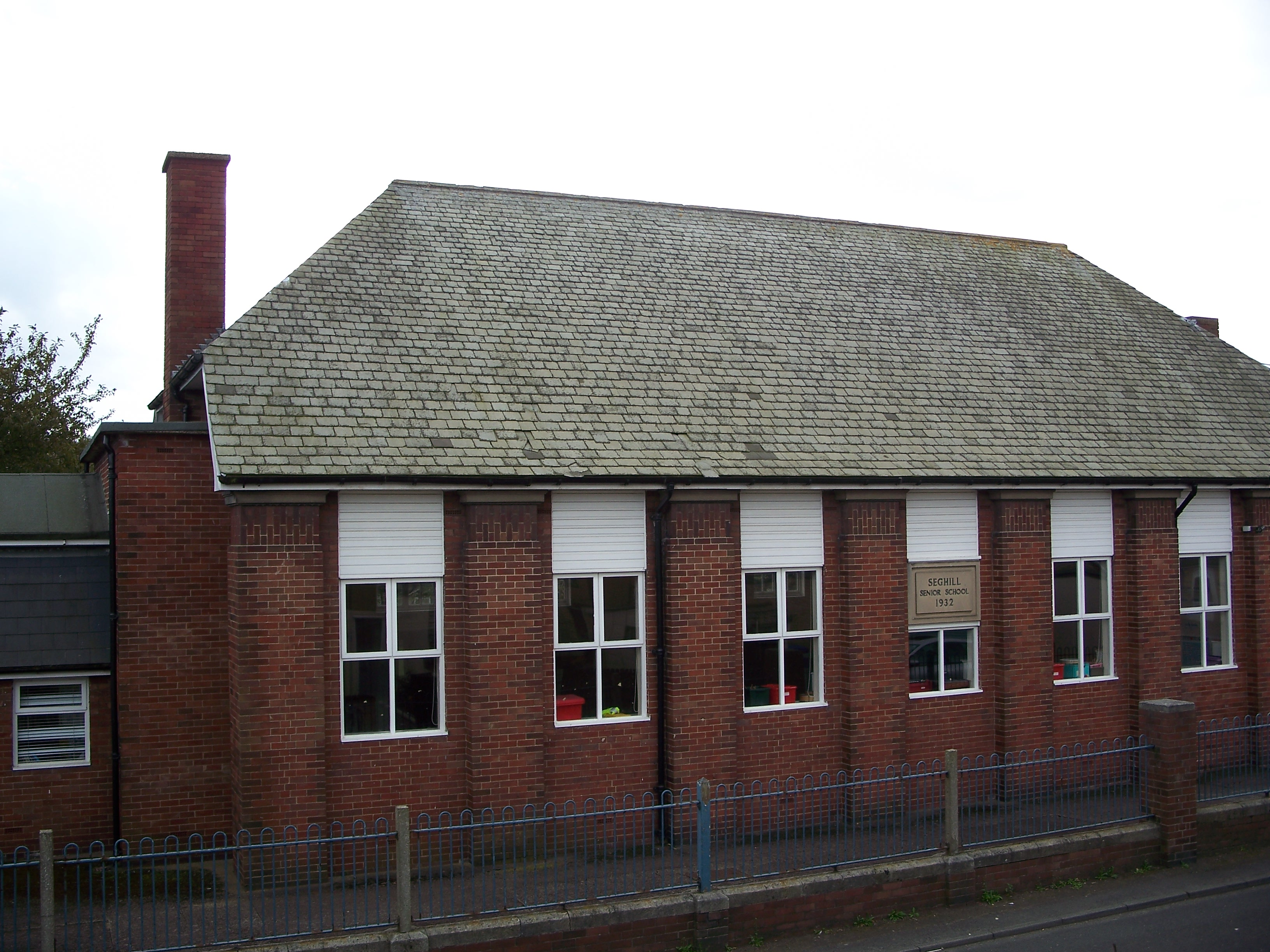
Seghill First School, opened in 1932 as a Senior School

There are two schools in Seghill: Seghill First School is a small first school which covers Reception to Year 4 and is run by Northumberland County Council. There is also Atkinson House EBD School.

== Activities ==
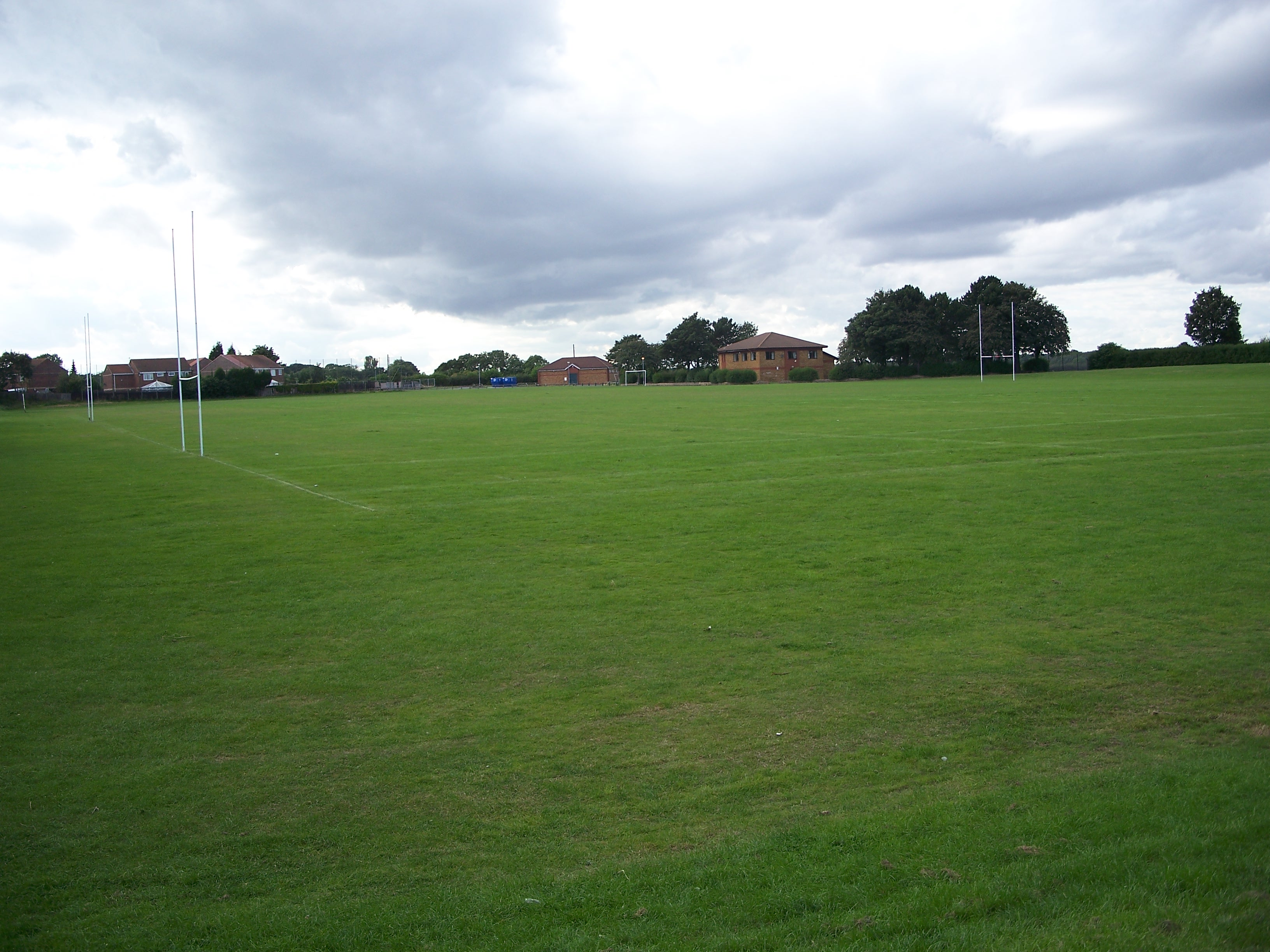
Seghill Welfare Field

The Annual Gala and Fair is held on the Welfare Field. It is a chance for the whole village to enjoy an otherwise normal day. It gives younger children of the village the chance to ride on floats, compete in races and fancy dress competitions and of course enjoy the amusements and attractions, provided by the Seghill Treats Committee.

On Seghill Welfare Field, Seghill Rugby and Football Club regularly practice on Saturday and Sunday mornings. In the summer months, when the nights are light, AFC Seghill can also be found training on the welfare field.

Next to the Welfare Field, there is a small scout hut where 1st Seghill Scouts meet on a Monday Night.
