= Seaton Sluice =

Village in Northumberland, England

Coordinates: 55.0826°N 1.4778°W

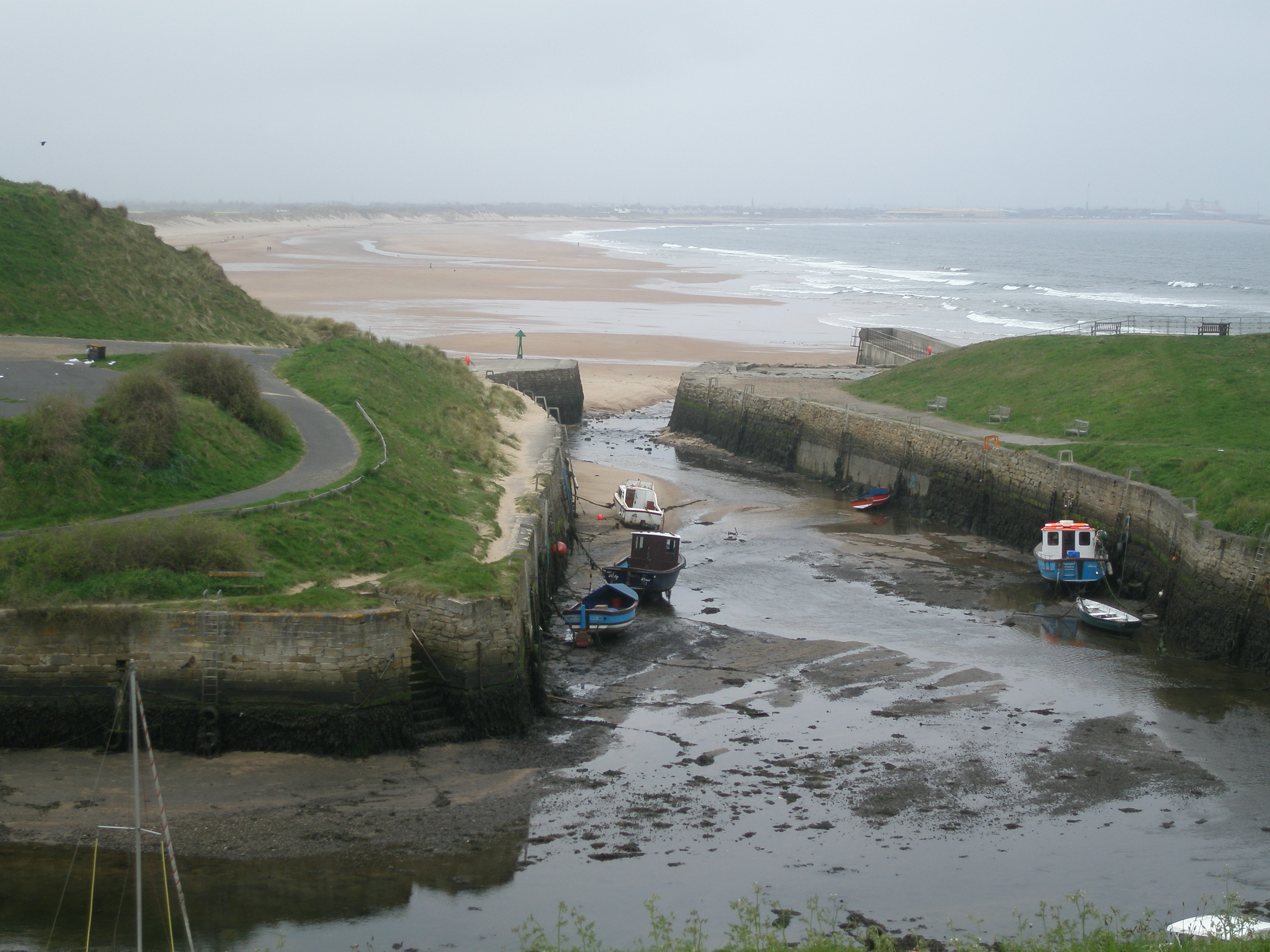
- Seaton Sluice Harbour

- Location within Northumberland
- Population: 2,957
- OS grid reference: NZ3477
- Civil parish: Seaton Valley
- Unitary authority: Northumberland
- Ceremonial county: Northumberland
- Region: North East
- Country: England
- Sovereign state: United Kingdom
- Post town: WHITLEY BAY
- Postcode district: NE26
- Dialling code: 0191
- Police: Northumbria
- Fire: Northumberland
- Ambulance: North East
- UK Parliament: Cramlington and Killingworth

Seaton Sluice is a village in Northumberland, England. It lies on the coast at the mouth of the Seaton Burn (a small river), midway between Whitley Bay and Blyth. The population of Seaton Sluice at the 2021 census was 2,957.

== Early history ==
Seaton Sluice lies 1/2 mile (800 metres) north of the village of Hartley, and was once part of it, being called Hartley Pans, because of the salt-pans used to harvest salt there since 1236. Hartley was once an area stretching from the Brier Dene Burn (in present-day Whitley Bay) to the Seaton Burn, which belonged to Tynemouth Priory. In 1100 the land became the property of the Hubert de Laval, nephew by marriage to William the Conqueror. The de Lavals (or Delavals) settled about 1/2 mile (800 metres) inland from Hartley Pans and their place of residence became Seaton Delaval, the name 'Seaton' being derived from Old English meaning a settlement (ton) by the sea.

== Harbour improvements ==
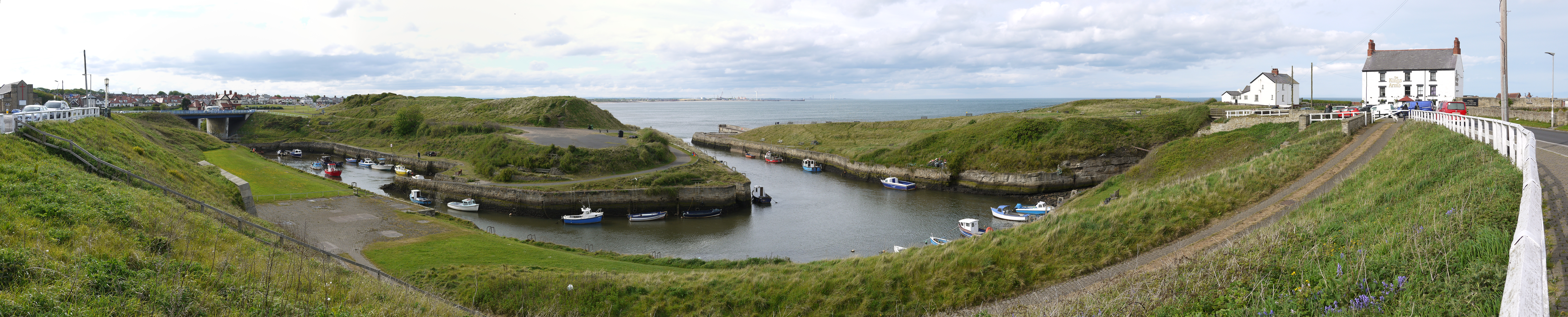
Seaton Sluice harbour

Before 1550 the salt produced at Hartley Pans had been transported to Blyth to be exported, but after that date it was shipped directly from the small, natural harbour. The village henceforth became known as Hartley Haven, and was used for the export of coal as well as salt. However the harbour was prone to silting, which limited access by ships. This problem was tackled by Sir Ralph Delaval (1622–1691), who had a pier constructed, and sluice gates that trapped the seawater at each high tide. At low tide the gates were opened, flushing the sand out of the harbour. Henceforth the village became known as Seaton Sluice.

The harbour remained like this until the 1760s, when Sir John Hussey Delaval had a new entrance made for the harbour by blasting a channel through solid rock, providing what was known as 'The Cut', 54 feet (16 m) deep, 30 feet (9.1 m) wide and 900 feet (270 m) long. The new channel was opened in 1763 and, as a result, the land between the old harbour entrance and the new channel became an island, known as 'Rocky Island'. A footbridge connected the island to the mainland. The new channel could be sealed off at both ends to allow loading to continue regardless of the tide level. On the other side of the old channel, opposite Rocky Island, was a ballast hill known as Sandy Island, built up from the ballast of ships entering the harbour. The ballast hill and The Cut can still be seen.

The new entrance proved to be a success and, in 1777, ships sailed out of the harbour carrying 80,000 tonnes of coal, 300 tons of salt and 1.75 million glass bottles. The coal was brought to the harbour from nearby collieries via wagonways, with coal wagons being drawn by horses. Salt continued to be exported from Seaton Sluice until 1798, when a new salt tax put an end to the trade.

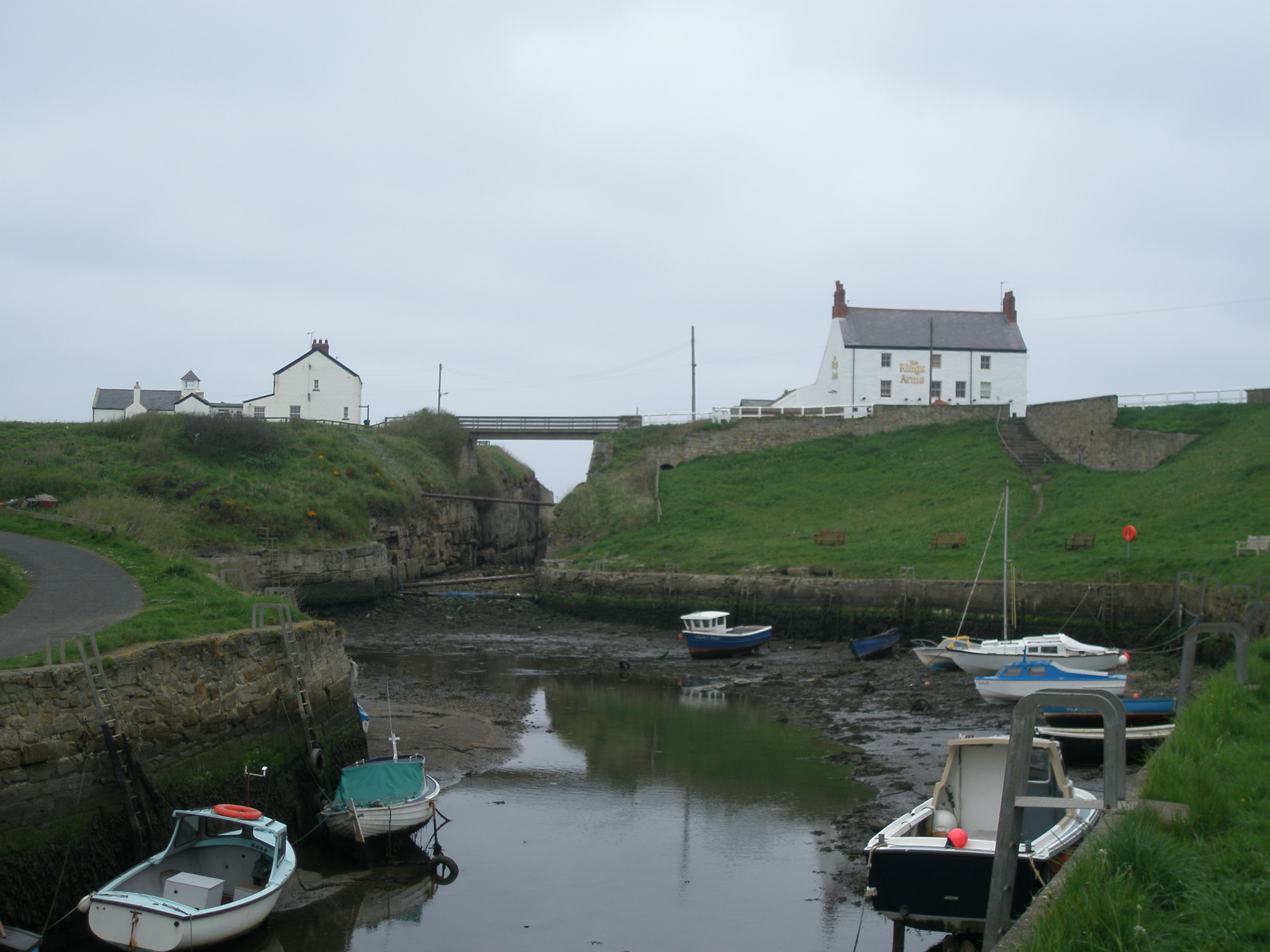
Seaton Sluice Harbour looking east towards 'The Cut' and its bridge, with the King’s Arms to the right and Rocky Island to the left

== The bottleworks ==
In 1763 Sir Francis Blake Delaval (1727–1771) obtained Parliamentary approval to develop 25 acres (10 ha) of land at Seaton Sluice as glassworks. The works was known as 'The Royal Hartley Bottleworks'. Sir Francis needed skilled glassmakers, and his brother Tom Delaval brought skilled men from Nienberge, in Germany, to train the local men in glassmaking. The works used local materials: sea sand, sea kelp, clay from the links and local coal. The glassworks expanded with time and eventually had six large cone-shaped furnaces which dominated the skyline; they were given the names: Gallagan, Bias, Charlotte, Hartley, Waterford and Success. The three larger cones were 130 feet (40 m) tall. In 1777 production reached 1,740,000 bottles per year. Bottles were sent down to the harbour via narrow gauge railways running through tunnels. The tunnels were used as air-raid shelters during the Second World War.

The bottles were carried to London on 'bottle sloops', slightly smaller than collier brigs, about 50 feet (15 m) long. A distinctive feature was that the main mast could be lowered, allowing them to pass under the arches of old London Bridge. A bottle sloop would make one round trip to London per month, as did the collier brigs. Bottles were also exported to Europe.

The bottleworks were so large that they contained a market place, a brewery, a granary, a brickyard, a chapel, shops, public houses and a quarry. The workers lived in stone-built houses in several streets around the bottleworks. In 1768 a shipyard was established which mostly built bottle sloops. It closed in 1810. Competition from other glass-making centres led to a decline in orders and the bottleworks closed in 1872. The last bottles to leave were on the 'Unity of Boston', bound for the Channel Islands. A few years later, in 1897, the cone-shaped furnaces were demolished and replaced by houses. Nowadays there is hardly any trace of the original bottleworks.

== Decline of the coal trade ==
Even with the harbour improvements made by the Delaval family, the harbour was still limited in the size of ships that it could handle. Meanwhile, competing ports such as Blyth, to the north, and the Tyne to the south spent money improving the dock facilities. The new Northumberland Dock on the Tyne, a 55 acre site, was completed in 1857. Seaton Sluice found it difficult to compete with these larger facilities.

A further blow to the coal trade from Seaton Sluice was the Hartley Colliery Disaster that occurred at the Hester Pit in the village of New Hartley, about 2 miles (3 kilometres) west of Seaton Sluice. The Hester Pit was the main source of local coal. However, in 1862, the beam of the pumping engine broke and fell down the only mineshaft, blocking it and trapping the miners underground. In all, 204 men and boys perished, in some cases several from the same family. The disaster led to the legal requirement in future mines, that there should always be two shafts. The loss of production from the Hester Pit spelled the end of the coal trade from Seaton Sluice and it became a quiet backwater. There is a memorial obelisk to the 204 men and boys who died in the graveyard of St Alban’s Church in the nearby village of Earsdon.

An attempt in the early part of the 20th century to develop Seaton Sluice as a tourist resort failed because a railway line, intended to lead north up the coast from Whitley Bay, was partly constructed but then abandoned as the First World War intervened. The remains of railway bridges and embankments can still be seen to the west of St Mary's Island.

== Seaton Delaval Hall ==
The Delavals settled at Seaton Delaval, inland from Seaton Sluice. There was already a Saxon church there and the Delavals built a fortified house near it. In 1100 Hubert de la Val rebuilt the Saxon church as the present Church of Our Lady on the same spot. The fortified house was gradually expanded during Tudor and Jacobean times to become an extensive manor house. In the early 18th century the manor house was replaced by the present Seaton Delaval Hall, designed by architect Sir John Vanbrugh. The hall was devastated by fire in 1822 and was partially restored; is now owned by the National Trust.

== Local interest ==
Seaton Sluice contains the following public houses:

- The King’s Arms – the oldest pub in the village, situated right next to the bridge leading to Rocky Island. It was constructed in the mid-eighteenth century as the overseer’s house, but later became a pub.
- The Waterford Arms – situated above the quay. It is named in honour of Susanna, Marchioness of Waterford, granddaughter to Lord Delaval, who inherited the estate in 1822. The pub occupies the site of the brewery that supplied beer to the ships, as well as to the glassworkers at the bottleworks.
- The Melton Constable – built in 1839, on the north side of the burn. It is named after Melton Constable, the Norfolk town associated with the Astley family who inherited the Delaval estates in 1814.
- The Delaval Arms – situated at the south end of Hartley.
- The Astley Arms – situated at the north end of Seaton Sluice. It is named in honour of the Astley family (see above).

There is also Seaton Sluice Working Men's Club near the Waterford Arms.

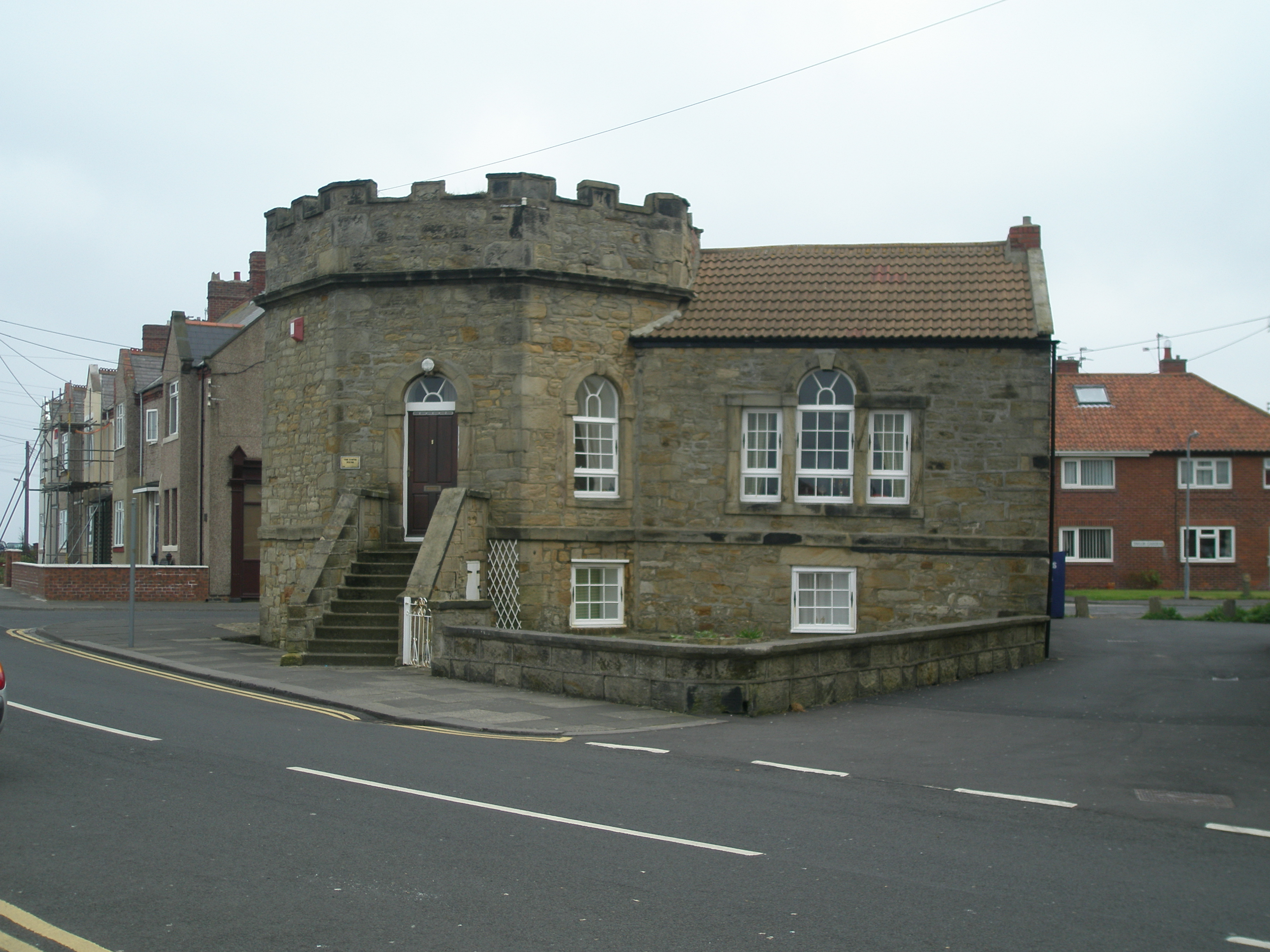
The Octagon building overlooking the harbour at Seaton Sluice

The Octagon, is a small castellated building to the east of the Waterford Arms which is grade II listed. It was built sometime before 1750 as the Harbour Office. It has been suggested that it was designed by Sir John Vanbrugh but there is no definitive evidence for this. It is now a private art gallery.

Seaton Delaval Hall, built by Sir John Vanbrugh between 1718 and 1729 for Admiral George Delaval, is on the outskirts of Seaton Sluice, on the road to Seaton Delaval. The hall, which is a Grade I listed building, is now owned by the National Trust and is open to visitors on designated days.

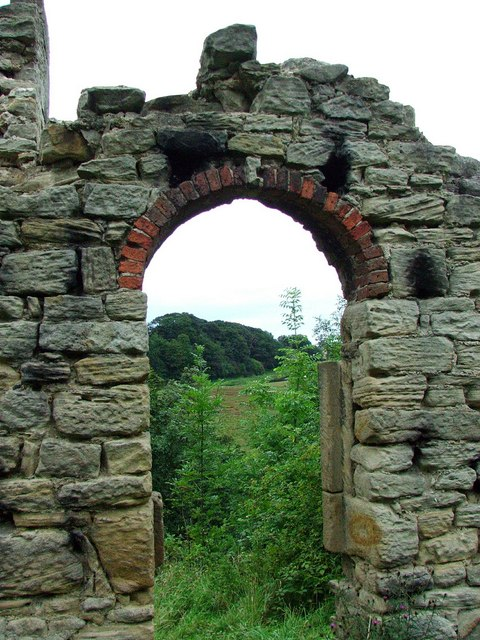
Starlight Castle

Near to Seaton Delaval Hall is the Church of Our Lady, built by the Delaval family in the 12th century and altered in the 14th and 19th centuries. It is a Grade I listed building.

Holywell Dene is a tree-lined valley through which the Seaton Burn flows to Seaton Sluice. The valley contains paths running alongside the burn and is maintained by the group 'Friends of Holywell Dene'. There is a ruined folly on the north bank of the dene known as 'Starlight Castle'. This was built by Sir Francis Delaval in 1750, according to legend after accepting a bet that he could build a home for a lady friend in a day. As it was a multi-arched stone building (left), presumably the bet was lost.

North of the harbour mouth, past Sandy Island, are Blyth Sands: a wide, sandy beach backed by sand dunes, stretching all the way to Blyth Harbour.
