= New Hartley =

Village in Northumberland, England

Coordinates: 55°05′04″N 1°31′12″W

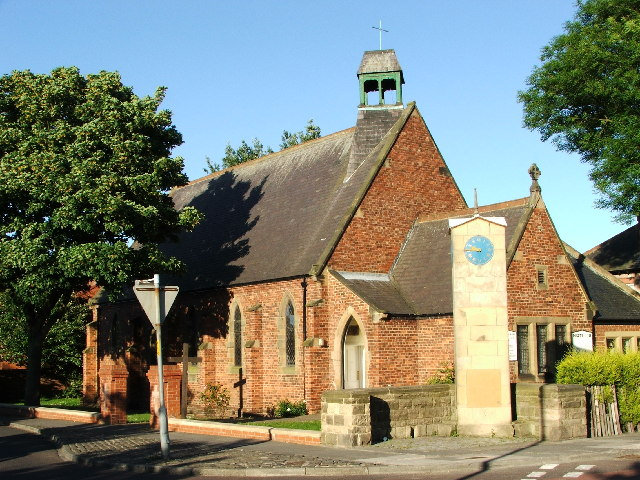
- Church of St. Michael and All Angels

- Location within Northumberland
- Population: 2,286
- Civil parish: Seaton Valley
- Unitary authority: Northumberland
- Ceremonial county: Northumberland
- Region: North East
- Country: England
- Sovereign state: United Kingdom
- Post town: WHITLEY BAY
- Postcode district: NE25
- Dialling code: 0191
- Police: Northumbria
- Fire: Northumberland
- Ambulance: North East
- UK Parliament: Cramlington and Killingworth

New Hartley is a small village in South East Northumberland, England, adjacent to Hartley, Seaton Delaval and Seaton Sluice. The village is just off the A190 road about 6 miles (10 kilometres) north of Tynemouth and 4 miles (6 kilometres) south of Blyth.

== History ==
The village is historically linked to nearby Hartley village, which was originally an Anglo-Saxon settlement. Records show that coal mining began in 1291 A number of pits were created and exhausted at Hartley, before a new pit called Hester was sunk in 1845. at a site in between Seaton Sluice and Seaton Delaval. Soon after, families settled around the new mine, and the village of New Hartley was created.

To the north and west of the pit, in a rough L shape, were built houses, a Methodist chapel, the "Hartley Hastings Arms" and New Hartley Workmen's Club.

=== Hartley Colliery Disaster ===
The New Hartley Pit Disaster occurred on 16 January 1862, it was during the change from the fore-shift to the back-shift when nearly all of the two shifts were still down the pit, that the beam of the pumping engine that kept the pit clear of water broke in two, and 20 tons of cast iron plunged down the shaft, stripping the brattices and rocks and blocking the one and only shaft. It took several days of heroic effort by rescue teams to reach the entombed men and boys – all to no avail as all were dead. All in all 204 men and boys perished in the disaster, either when the beam plummeted down the shaft or as a result of being entombed. A fitting Memorial to all of them is at the nearby St Alban's Church, Earsdon, where an obelisk in the churchyard lists the names and ages of all the casualties. Additionally the everlasting memorial is that Parliament quickly passed a law ensuring that all future pits opened had to have two shafts. There is a memorial garden in the village at the site of the disaster, which includes remnants of the shaft entrance.

Autumn Watch BBC Television presenter Kate Humble was reduced to tears during the making of the BBC programme Who Do You Think You Are? when she discovered her family history was linked to the disaster. Kate's great, great, great-grandfather, Joseph Humble, was the manager of the New Hartley Hester Colliery when the tragedy claimed the life of his 27-year-old nephew, also called Joseph Humble.

== Social facilities ==
A housing development, "The Brambles" was completed in 2008 adding 64 homes to the village. The local pub, the "Hartley Hastings", is known locally as The Haggans – former licensees Isaac and Jane Haggan ran the pub in 1950–1960. There is also a large Working Men's Club, a Post Office and convenience shop. Christmas street lights are displayed outside the Post Office and adjoining Convenience Store. There is also a Masonic Hall at Seaton Delaval.

=== Sports ===
New Hartley football club has produced Liverpool Champions League winner Ray Kennedy(Liverpool), Michael Bridges (Sunderland and Leeds United), Bobby Cummings (Newcastle), and Ron Guthrie (Newcastle and Sunderland). The club has a strong under 18-level and is a feeder club for Glasgow Rangers.

The village was home to ex-Liverpool and Arsenal footballer Ray Kennedy, who had begun his career with the New Hartley Juniors.

== Transport ==
The X7 operates a twice hourly service to and from Newcastle, with a 50-minute journey time. Local bus operator Phoenix also provides a 2 times a day service (weekdays only) to nearby Cramlington.

The old Blyth and Tyne Railway cuts through the eastern end of the village. Local campaigns to reopen this line, including the station at Seaton Delaval, finally succeeded with the opening of the Northumberland Line in 2024, although the station at Hartley itself did not re-open.
