= Seaton Valley =

Civil parish in Northumberland, England

Coordinates: 55.082°N 1.586°W

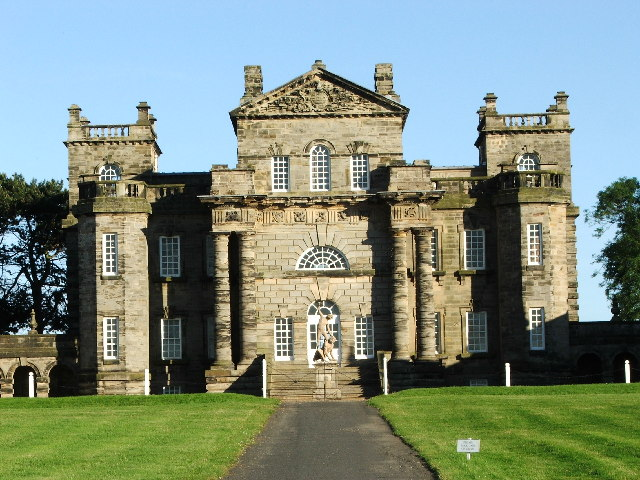
- Seaton Delaval Hall

- Location within Northumberland
- Population: 15,422 (2011)
- OS grid reference: NZ303755
- Civil parish: Seaton Valley
- Unitary authority: Northumberland
- Ceremonial county: Northumberland
- Region: North East
- Country: England
- Sovereign state: United Kingdom
- Post town: CRAMLINGTON
- Postcode district: NE23
- Post town: WHITLEY BAY
- Postcode district: NE25, NE26
- Dialling code: 0191
- Police: Northumbria
- Fire: Northumberland
- Ambulance: North East
- UK Parliament: Cramlington and Killingworth

Seaton Valley is a civil parish at the south eastern corner of Northumberland, and northern North Tyneside, consisting of five villages lying between Cramlington, Blyth and Whitley Bay. The largest village is Seaton Delaval, while Seaton Sluice is on the coast; the other three are Seghill, New Hartley, and Seaton Burn (which is in North Tyneside)

It takes its name from the stream Seaton Burn, a small river which flows through the area.

It was preceded by the Seaton Valley Urban District which existed until 1974, but has different boundaries; the urban district contained Cramlington, but did not contain Seaton Sluice which was then part of Borough of Whitley Bay.

== Parish Council ==
The community council consists of nine elected members:

- Sue Bowman (Chair)

Susan Dungworth (Vice Chair)

- David Ferguson
- Jill Henderson
- Les Bowman
- Eva Coulson
- Ann Stanners
- Sue Bowman
- Eve Chicken
- Rob Forsyth

== Social and Community Enterprises, Foundations and Trusts ==
The Seaton Valley co-operative was founded and operated in the district providing services to its member co-owners and passing trade. It was supplied and itself held a co-ownership stake in its wholesaler, which was based in Manchester, England and today has become the co-operative group. In 2015 resident members voted to transfer their engagements and memberships stakes of between £1 and £60,000 to the scotmid co-operative.

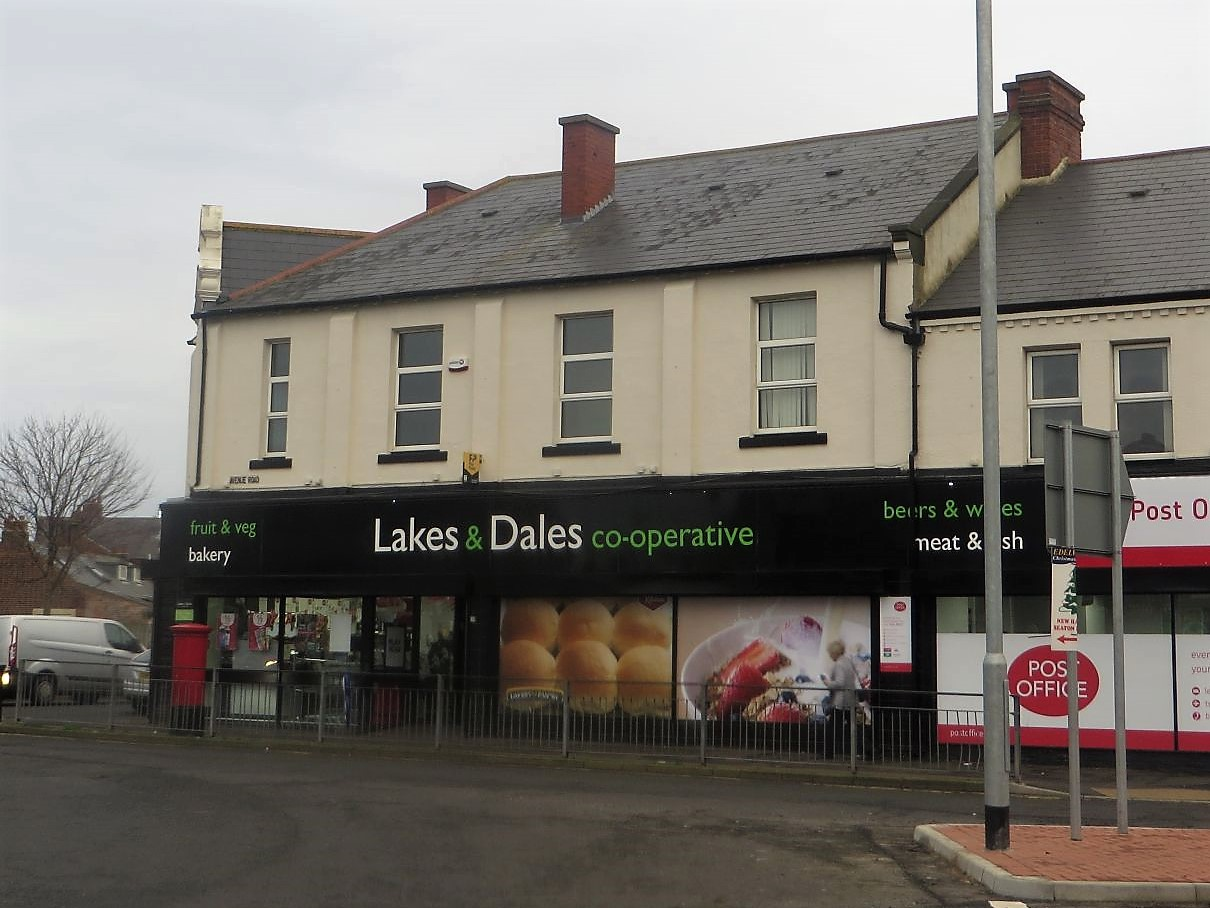
A Lakes & Dales store in Seaton Delaval, owned by the communities and households it serves.

Working Mens Clubs, Community Interest Companies, Leisure Trusts and Community Land trust also form part of the wider regions community and social economy.
