= Seaton Delaval =

Village in Northumberland, England

Coordinates: 55.072876°N 1.525206°W

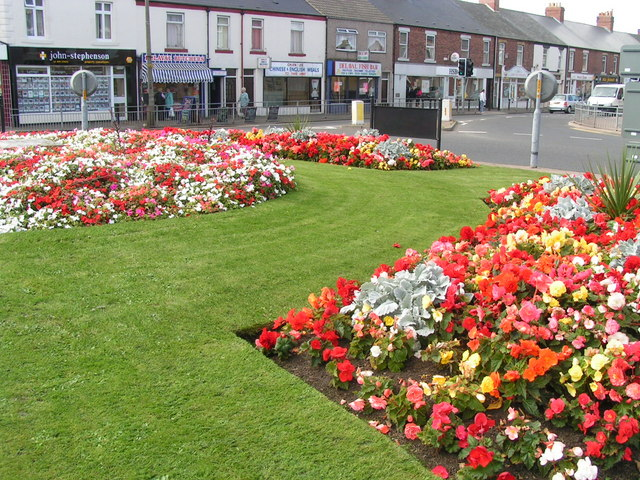
- Seaton Delaval

- Location within Northumberland
- Population: 4,371 (2001)
- OS grid reference: NZ305755
- Civil parish: Seaton Valley
- Unitary authority: Northumberland
- Ceremonial county: Northumberland
- Region: North East
- Country: England
- Sovereign state: United Kingdom
- Post town: WHITLEY BAY
- Postcode district: NE25
- Dialling code: 0191
- Police: Northumbria
- Fire: Northumberland
- Ambulance: North East
- UK Parliament: Cramlington and Killingworth

Seaton Delaval is a village and former civil parish, now in the parish of Seaton Valley, in Northumberland, England, with a population of 4,371. The largest of the five villages in Seaton Valley, it is the site of Seaton Delaval Hall, completed by Sir John Vanbrugh in 1727.

== History ==
The name 'Seaton Delaval' was first attested as 'Seton de la Val' in 1270. 'Seaton' simply means 'sea town', referring to the village's nearness to the North Sea. The land was held by the Delaval family, who took their name from Laval in Maine in France. Their descendants are still major landholders in the area today and the current Lord Hastings is Delaval Astley, 23rd Baron Hastings.

The folk song ‘Blackleg Miner’ mentions the village:

Oh, Delaval is a terrible place
They rub wet clay in the blackleg's face.
And around the heaps they run a foot race,
To catch the blackleg miner!

So divint gan near the Seghill mine.
Across the way they stretch a line,
To catch the throat and break the spine
Of the dirty blackleg miner!

In 2010 the armed robbery of Jimmy's Fish Bar featured in news coverage of Raoul Moat's crime rampage.

== Governance ==
From 1974 the village was part of the Blyth Valley borough, but as part of the 2009 structural changes to local government in England responsibility was transferred to Northumberland County Council. The village is in the NE25 post code area and the coastal town of Whitley Bay, Tyne and Wear. Unlike other parts of Northumberland, Seaton Delaval and the surrounding villages use the Tyne and Wear 0191 area code.

Seaton Delaval was formerly a township and chapelry in the parish of Earsdon, from 1866 Seaton Delaval was a civil parish in its own right, on 1 April 1935 the parish was abolished to form Seaton Valley, parts also went to Blyth and Whitley and Monkseaton. In 1931 the parish had a population of 7377.

== Geography ==
The village is centred on the intersection of two main roads: the A192 road running from North Shields to Morpeth and the A190 road running from the Dudley village bypass to Seaton Sluice. These main roads are lined by terraced housing from the turn of the 20th century but large post-war and 1970s house development is predominant. There are small pockets of more recent housing and a new estate of houses was completed in 2012.

Nearby villages include:

- Holywell
- Seghill
- Seaton Sluice
- New Hartley

== Economy ==
The village has its own independent cooperative, the Seaton Valley Co-Operative Society, which runs a small supermarket, post office and off-licence. There are also several convenience stores and public houses, a regionally renowned ice cream parlour, a pine furnishing store, a florist and a garage.

The Victoria and Albert Inn was formerly two separate inns, the Victoria dating back to 1839. They were merged to form The Victoria and Albert Inn. In 2012 local residents put up a fight and took on Tesco and prevented them from changing their pub to a Tesco Express store. In 2019/2020 the Victoria and Albert underwent a major refurbishment.

The Seaton Terrace is now the premier social club in the Village after the demise of the "Top Club". The club has over 850 members and has recently become solvent again, paying off over £250,000 worth of debt and was due to celebrate its "Independence Day" on 4 July after getting its deeds back.

Coty had a factory in the village following a merger between Procter and Gamble and Coty for the acquisition of their beauty business, once the independent Shultons factory. Shultons formerly manufactured Old Spice aftershave before Procter & Gamble's acquisition of the brand. The factory closed in 2018. Heather Mills bought the 55-acre site in 2019 and said that it would offer vegan businesses manufacturing, storage and office space. According to The Guardian, "Mills said it would make the region a 'world centre for the creation of planet-rescuing ideas' and the 'northern powerhouse for the brightest vegan minds'."

== Landmarks ==
Seaton Delaval Hall, taken into the care of the National Trust in 2009, is around 1/2 mile (800 metres) east of the village off the A190.

== Transport ==
A railway line runs to the north of the village. A railway station was opened in 1841 but was closed to passengers in 1964. A new station opened on 15 December 2024 as part of the Northumberland Line project, with direct trains to Ashington and Newcastle (Central). There are bus links to nearby Whitley Bay, Cramlington and Blyth as well as to Newcastle-upon-Tyne.

== Education ==
The village is served by five main schools:

- Seaton Delaval Parent/Toddler Group
- Seaton Delaval Pre-school (ages 2 – school)
- Seaton Terrace Nursery (closed/demolished)
- Seaton Delaval Community First School (previously "The Station School" before being moved to the same site as Whytrig Middle as part of Northumberland County Council's switch from three to two-tier education)
- Holywell Village First School
- Whytrig County Middle School (moved on to the site of Astley High School as of September 2014)
- Astley Community High School (including Sixth Form and Adult Education)

== Religious sites ==
There are a number of Christian churches in the village:

- The Church of Our Lady (Church of England)
- Elsdon Avenue United Reformed and Methodist Church
- Holy Trinity, Seghill (Church of England)

== Culture ==
The Seaton Delaval Arts Centre, a small auditorium hosting musical and drama entertainment, often locally produced, is housed in the former Salvation Army Hall in the centre of the village.

== Notable residents ==
- Ralph Delaval – Admiral
- George Delaval – Admiral and builder of Seaton Delaval Hall
- Noel Forster – Artist and teacher
- John Gardner – Thriller writer, continued James Bond books
- Ivor Gurney – Poet and composer
- Ray Kennedy – Arsenal and Liverpool footballer
- Laura Pidcock - Former Labour MP for North West Durham
- England football internationals Clem Stephenson and his brother George were both born in Seaton Delaval
- Billy Wilson professional footballer Blackburn Rovers and Portsmouth F.C.
- Gordon Parker - Novelist, Playwright and Literary Critic
