= Earsdon =

Village in Tyne and Wear, England

Coordinates: 55.0463°N 1.4952°W

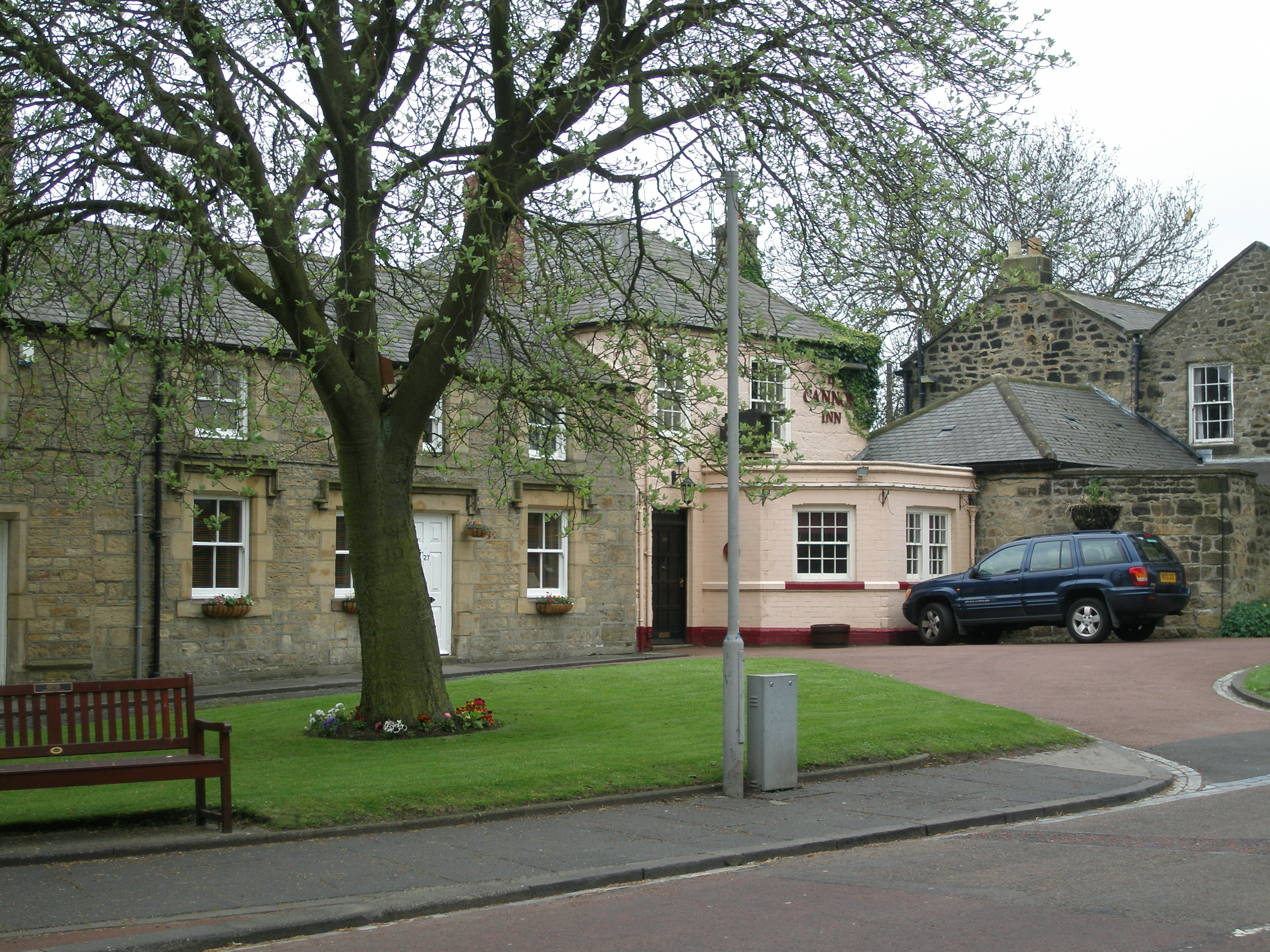
- Earsdon Front Street with The Cannon public house

- Location within Tyne and Wear
- OS grid reference: NZ322725
- Metropolitan borough: North Tyneside
- Metropolitan county: Tyne and Wear
- Region: North East
- Country: England
- Sovereign state: United Kingdom
- Post town: WHITLEY BAY
- Postcode district: NE25
- Dialling code: 0191
- Police: Northumbria
- Fire: Tyne and Wear
- Ambulance: North East
- UK Parliament: Tynemouth

Earsdon is a village in the borough of North Tyneside in the county of Tyne and Wear, England. It sits on the border of Northumberland, which it is historically part of, and is approximately two miles from Whitley Bay. The village had a population of 613 in 2011.

== History ==
Earsdon was an urban district from 1897 to 1935, consisting of the four parishes of Earsdon, Backworth, Holywell, and Murton. Earsdon Urban District and parish was abolished on 1 April 1935, with the majority of the area going to Seaton Valley, apart from small areas which went to Tynemouth and Whitley and Monkseaton. In 1931 the parish had a population of 5965.

== Features ==
The graveyard of St Alban's Anglican church is home to a memorial to the 204 men and boys killed in the Hartley Colliery disaster of 1862, at the nearby village of New Hartley. There is also a war memorial in the village.

A second church, Earsdon Methodist Chapel, is located within a former quarry.

There is a disused coal mine works a short distance from the village, including the Fenwick Heap. After closure, the heap spontaneously combusted underground and was burning internally until work started to reclaim the land. The reclamation work started in 2009 and was completed in September 2010.

== In fiction ==
- The children's television series Supergran was filmed in part in the village.
- The Beehive Inn near Earsdon was used for the filming of the 1976 film The Likely Lads.

== Gallery ==
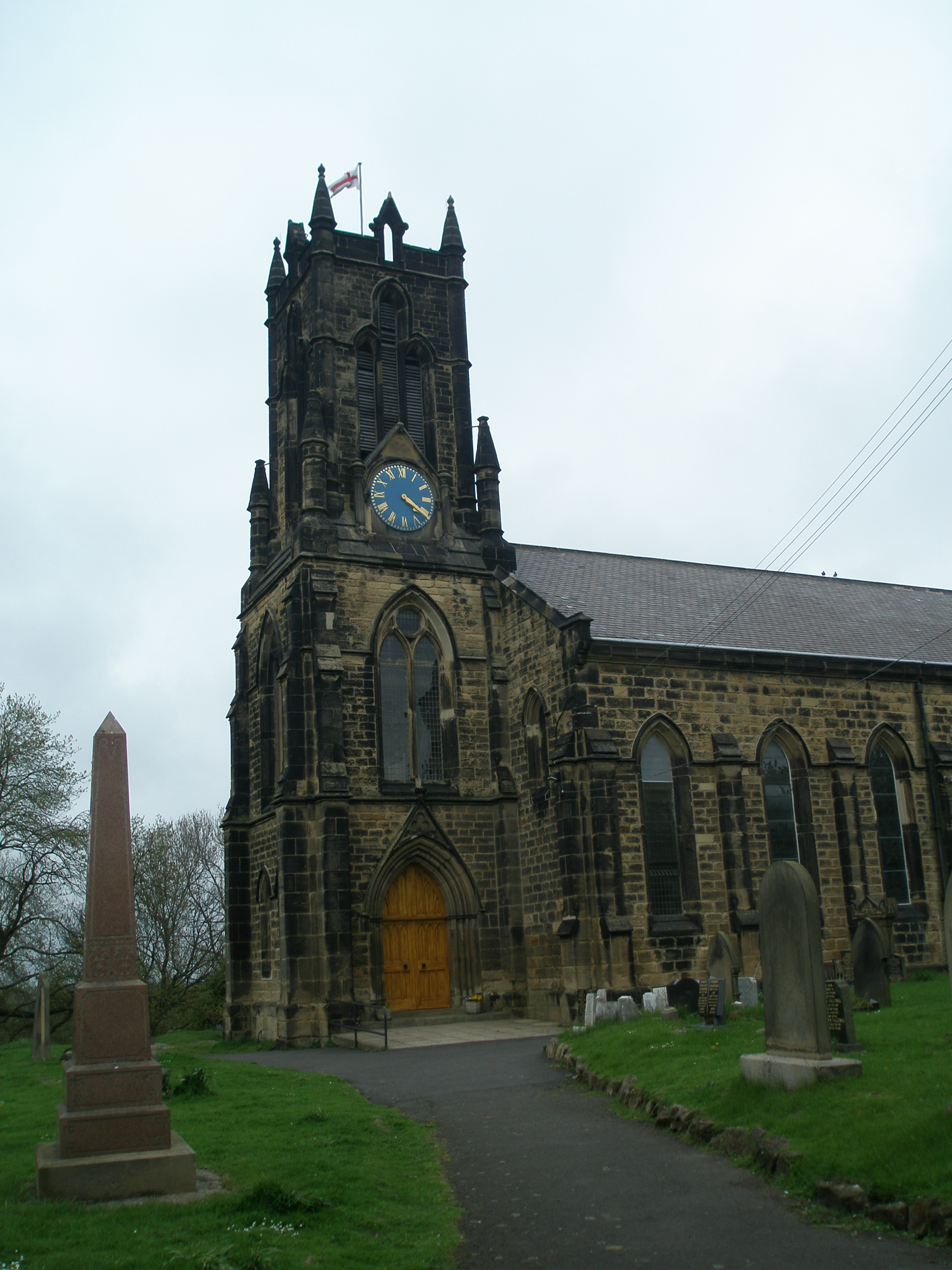
Church of St Alban

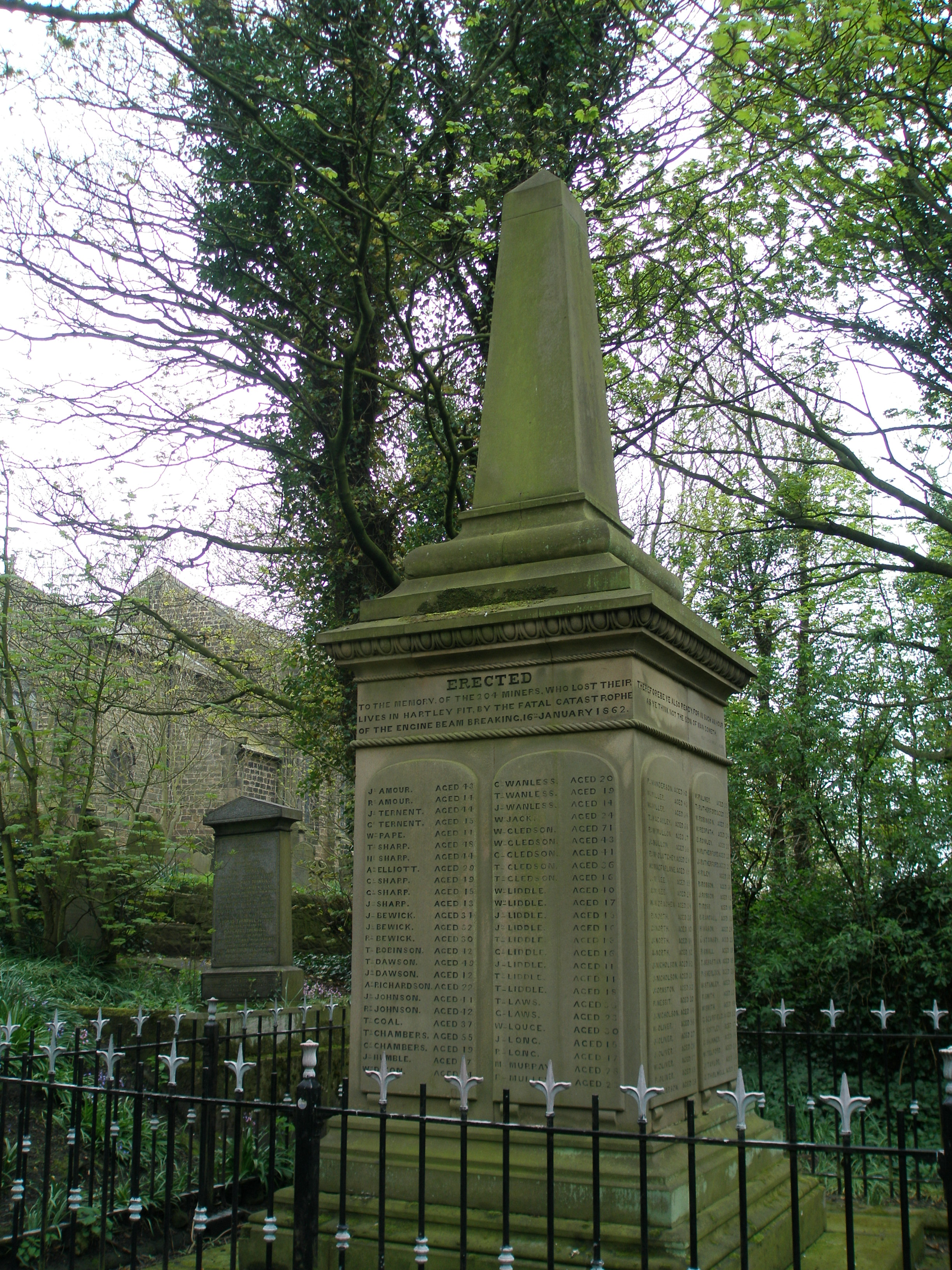
Monument to Hartley Pit Disaster in St Alban's churchyard
