= List of people involved in coronations of the British monarch =

Below is a list of people involved in coronations of the British monarch:

== Clerics ==
=== Presiding clerics ===
- 1397: Thomas Arundel, Archbishop of Canterbury
- 1399: Thomas Arundel, Archbishop of Canterbury
- 1403: Thomas Arundel, Archbishop of Canterbury
- 1413: Thomas Arundel, Archbishop of Canterbury
- 1421: Henry Chichele, Archbishop of Canterbury
- 1424: Henry Wardlaw, Bishop of St Andrews
- 1429: Henry Chichele, Archbishop of Canterbury
- 1437: Michael Ochiltree, Bishop of Dunblane
- 1445: John Stafford, Archbishop of Canterbury
- 1460: James Kennedy, Bishop of St Andrews
- 1461: Thomas Bourchier, Archbishop of Canterbury
- 1465: Thomas Bourchier, Archbishop of Canterbury
- 1483: Thomas Bourchier, Archbishop of Canterbury
- 1485: Thomas Bourchier, Archbishop of Canterbury
- 1487: John Morton, Archbishop of Canterbury
- 1488: William Scheves, Archbishop of St Andrews
- 1509: William Warham, Archbishop of Canterbury
- 1513: James Beaton, Archbishop of Glasgow
- 1533: Thomas Cranmer, Archbishop of Canterbury
- 1540: David Beaton, Archbishop of St Andrews
- 1543: John Hamilton, Archbishop of St Andrews
- 1547: Thomas Cranmer, Archbishop of Canterbury
- 1553: Stephen Gardiner, Bishop of Winchester
- 1559: Owen Oglethorpe, Bishop of Carlisle
- 1567: Adam Bothwell, Bishop of Orkney
- 1590: Adam Bothwell, Bishop of Orkney
- 1603: John Whitgift, Archbishop of Canterbury
- 1626: George Abbot, Archbishop of Canterbury
- 1633: John Spottiswoode, Archbishop of St Andrews
- 1651: Archibald Campbell, 1st Marquess of Argyll
- 1661: William Juxon, Archbishop of Canterbury
- 1685: William Sancroft, Archbishop of Canterbury
- 1689: Henry Compton, Bishop of London
- 1702: Thomas Tenison, Archbishop of Canterbury
- 1714: Thomas Tenison, Archbishop of Canterbury
- 1727: William Wake, Archbishop of Canterbury
- 1761: Thomas Secker, Archbishop of Canterbury
- 1821: Charles Manners-Sutton, Archbishop of Canterbury
- 1831: William Howley, Archbishop of Canterbury
- 1838: William Howley, Archbishop of Canterbury
- 1902: Frederick Temple, Archbishop of Canterbury
- 1911: Randall Davidson, Archbishop of Canterbury
- 1937: Cosmo Gordon Lang, Archbishop of Canterbury
- 1953: Geoffrey Fisher, Archbishop of Canterbury
- 2023: Justin Welby, Archbishop of Canterbury

=== Deans of Westminster ===
- 1714: Francis Atterbury, Bishop of Rochester
- 1727: Samuel Bradford, Bishop of Rochester
- 1761: Zachary Pearce, Bishop of Rochester
- 1821: John Ireland
- 1831: John Ireland
- 1838: Ireland was too ill to take part, and his place was taken by his Sub-Dean Lord John Thynne
- 1902: Armitage Robinson
- 1911: Herbert Edward Ryle
- 1937: William Foxley Norris
- 1953: Alan Campbell Don
- 2023: David Hoyle

=== Archbishops of York ===
- 1689: Thomas Lamplugh
- 1702: John Sharp
- 1714: Sir William Dawes, 3rd Baronet
- 1727: Lancelot Blackburne
- 1821: Edward Venables-Vernon-Harcourt
- 1831: Edward Venables-Vernon-Harcourt
- 1838: Edward Venables-Vernon-Harcourt
- 1902: William Maclagan
- 1911: Cosmo Gordon Lang
- 1937: William Temple
- 1953: Cyril Garbett
- 2023: Stephen Cottrell

=== Bishops Assistant to the monarch ===
- 1685: Thomas Ken, Bishop of Bath and Wells, and Nathaniel Crew, 3rd Baron Crew, Bishop of Durham
- 1689: Peter Mews, Bishop of Winchester, and Sir Jonathan Trelawny, 3rd Baronet, Bishop of Bristol
- 1702: Nathaniel Crew, 3rd Baron Crew, Bishop of Durham, and Sir Jonathan Trelawny, 3rd Baronet, Bishop of Exeter
- 1714: George Hooper, Bishop of Bath and Wells, and Nathaniel Crew, 3rd Baron Crew, Bishop of Durham
- 1727: John Wynne, Bishop of St Asaph, and William Talbot, Bishop of Durham
- 1761: Lord James Beauclerk, Bishop of Hereford, and Richard Trevor, Bishop of Durham
- 1821: George Pelham, Bishop of Lincoln (in the absence of Richard Beadon, Bishop of Bath and Wells), and Edward Legge, Bishop of Oxford (in the absence of Shute Barrington, Bishop of Durham)
- 1831: George Henry Law, Bishop of Bath and Wells, and Edward Venables-Vernon-Harcourt, Archbishop of York (in the absence of William Van Mildert, Bishop of Durham)
- 1838: George Henry Law, Bishop of Bath and Wells, and Edward Maltby, Bishop of Durham
- 1902: George Kennion, Bishop of Bath and Wells, and Handley Moule, Bishop of Durham
- 1911: George Kennion, Bishop of Bath and Wells, and Handley Moule, Bishop of Durham
- 1937: Basil Wynne Willson, Bishop of Bath and Wells, and Hensley Henson, Bishop of Durham
- 1953: Harold Bradfield, Bishop of Bath and Wells, and Michael Ramsey, Bishop of Durham
- 2023: Michael Beasley, Bishop of Bath and Wells, and Paul Butler, Bishop of Durham

=== Bishops Assistant to the consort ===
- 1685: Henry Compton, Bishop of London, and Peter Mews, Bishop of Winchester
- 1689: None (William III and Mary II were co-monarchs)
- 1702: Not done for male consorts
- 1714: None (Sophia of Celle was in imprisonment)
- 1727: Richard Willis, Bishop of Winchester, and Edmund Gibson, Bishop of London
- 1761: Thomas Hayter, Bishop of Norwich, and John Thomas, Bishop of Lincoln
- 1821: None (Queen Caroline was forbidden to attend the coronation)
- 1831: Charles Sumner, Bishop of Winchester, and Robert Carr, Bishop of Chichester
- 1838: None
- 1902: Francis Paget, Bishop of Oxford, and John Sheepshanks, Bishop of Norwich
- 1911: Edward Carr Glyn, Bishop of Peterborough, and Francis Paget, Bishop of Oxford
- 1937: Percy Herbert, Bishop of Blackburn, and Michael Furse, Bishop of St Albans
- 1953: Not done for male consorts
- 2023: Richard Jackson, Bishop of Hereford, and Graham Usher, Bishop of Norwich

== Standard bearers ==
=== Australia ===
- 1911: Henry Northcote, 1st Baron Northcote
- 1937: Stanley Bruce
- 1953: Sir Thomas White
- 2023: Sam Kerr

=== Canada ===
- 1911: John Hamilton-Gordon, 7th Earl of Aberdeen
- 1937: Vincent Massey
- 1953: Norman Robertson
- 2023: Colonel Jeremy Hansen

=== Ceylon ===
- 1953: Sir Edwin Wijeyeratne

=== England ===
- 1821: Rowland Hill, 1st Baron Hill
- 1902: Frank Dymoke
- 1911: Frank Dymoke
- 1937: Edward Stanley, 17th Earl of Derby
- 1953: Edward Stanley, 18th Earl of Derby
- 2023: Hugh Grosvenor, 7th Duke of Westminster

=== Hanover ===
- 1821: John Bourke, 4th Earl of Mayo

=== India ===
- 1911: George Curzon, 1st Baron Curzon of Kedleston
- 1937: Sir Firozkhan Noon

=== Ireland ===
- 1821: William Beresford, 1st Baron Beresford
- 1902: Charles O'Conor Don
- 1937: Bernard Forbes, 8th Earl of Granard
- 1953: William Sidney, 6th Baron De L'Isle and Dudley
- 2023: Nicholas Alexander, 7th Earl of Caledon

=== New Zealand ===
- 1911: William Plunket, 5th Baron Plunket
- 1937: W. J. Jordan
- 1953: Frederick Doidge
- 2023: Hayden Smith

=== Pakistan ===
- 1953: Mirza Abol Hassan Ispahani

=== Royal ===
- 1821: Charles Stanhope, 3rd Earl of Harrington
- 1911: Henry Petty-FitzMaurice, 5th Marquess of Lansdowne
- 1937: George Cholmondeley, 5th Marquess of Cholmondeley
- 1953: Bernard Montgomery, 1st Viscount Montgomery of Alamein
- 2023: Francis John Fane Marmion Dymoke

=== Scotland ===
- 1821: James Maitland, 8th Earl of Lauderdale
- 1902: Henry Scrymgeour-Wedderburn, de jure 10th Earl of Dundee
- 1937: Henry Scrymgeour-Wedderburn, de jure 11th Earl of Dundee
- 1953: Henry Scrymgeour-Wedderburn, de facto 11th Earl of Dundee
- 2023: Alexander Henry Scrymgeour, 12th Earl of Dundee

=== South Africa ===
- 1911: William Palmer, 2nd Earl of Selborne
- 1937: Charles Theodore Te Water
- 1953: Albertus Geyer

=== Union ===
- 1821: George Cholmondeley, 1st Marquess of Cholmondeley
- 1902: Arthur Wellesley, 4th Duke of Wellington
- 1911: Arthur Wellesley, 4th Duke of Wellington
- 1937: Frank Dymoke
- 1953: Capt. John Dymoke
- 2023: Cadet Warrant Officer Elliott Tyson-Lee

=== Wales ===
- 1911: Llewelyn Lloyd-Mostyn, 3rd Baron Mostyn
- 1937: Ivor Windsor-Clive, 2nd Earl of Plymouth
- 1953: William Ormsby-Gore, 4th Baron Harlech
- 2023: Charles Paget, 8th Marquess of Anglesey

== Regalia ==
=== Sovereign's regalia ===
==== Bearers of St Edward's Crown (and Lord High Stewards of England) ====
- 1685: James Butler, 1st Duke of Ormonde
- 1689: William Cavendish, 4th Earl of Devonshire (William III), Charles Seymour, 6th Duke of Somerset (Mary II)
- 1702: William Cavendish, 1st Duke of Devonshire
- 1714: Charles FitzRoy, 2nd Duke of Grafton
- 1727: Lionel Sackville, 1st Duke of Dorset
- 1761: William Talbot, 1st Earl Talbot
- 1821: Henry Paget, 1st Marquess of Anglesey
- 1831: Alexander Hamilton, 10th Duke of Hamilton
- 1838: Alexander Hamilton, 10th Duke of Hamilton
- 1902: Charles Spencer-Churchill, 9th Duke of Marlborough
- 1911: Henry Percy, 7th Duke of Northumberland
- 1937: James Gascoyne-Cecil, 4th Marquess of Salisbury
- 1953: Andrew Cunningham, 1st Viscount Cunningham of Hyndhope
- 2023: General Sir Gordon Messenger

==== Bearers of St Edward's Staff ====
- 1685: Robert Bruce, 1st Earl of Ailesbury
- 1689: Charles Montagu, 4th Earl of Manchester
- 1702: Charles Sackville, 6th Earl of Dorset
- 1714: James Cecil, 5th Earl of Salisbury
- 1727: Henry Grey, 1st Duke of Kent
- 1761: Evelyn Pierrepont, 2nd Duke of Kingston-upon-Hull
- 1821: James Cecil, 1st Marquess of Salisbury
- 1831: George FitzRoy, 4th Duke of Grafton
- 1838: James Innes-Ker, 6th Duke of Roxburghe
- 1902: Charles Wynn-Carington, 1st Earl Carrington
- 1911: Henry Innes-Ker, 8th Duke of Roxburghe
- 1937: Edward Wood, 3rd Viscount Halifax
- 1953: Gilbert Heathcote-Drummond-Willoughby, 3rd Earl of Ancaster
- 2023: Elizabeth Manningham-Buller, Baroness Manningham-Buller

==== Bearers of the Golden Spurs ====
- 1189: John Marshal, the Marshal of the Horses of England
- 1685: Henry Yelverton, 15th Baron Grey de Ruthyn
- 1689: Henry Yelverton, 15th Baron Grey de Ruthyn
- 1702: Henry Yelverton, 1st Viscount Longueville
- 1714: Talbot Yelverton, 2nd Viscount Longueville
- 1727: William Montagu, 2nd Duke of Manchester (for Talbot Yelverton, 1st Earl of Sussex who was acting as Earl Marshal)
- 1761: Henry Yelverton, 3rd Earl of Sussex
- 1821: George Gough-Calthorpe, 3rd Baron Calthorpe
- 1831: George Rawdon-Hastings, 2nd Marquess of Hastings
- 1838: George Byron, 7th Baron Byron (deputy to Barbara Rawdon-Hastings, 20th Baroness Grey of Ruthin)
- 1902: Rawdon Clifton, 23rd Baron Grey de Ruthyn and Charles Rawdon-Hastings, 11th Earl of Loudoun (one each)
- 1911: Rawdon Clifton, 23rd Baron Grey de Ruthyn and Charles Rawdon-Hastings, 11th Earl of Loudoun (one each)
- 1937: Richard Yarde-Buller, 4th Baron Churston and Albert Astley, 21st Baron Hastings (one each)
- 1953: Richard Yarde-Buller, 4th Baron Churston and Albert Astley, 21st Baron Hastings (one each)
- 2023: Simon Abney-Hastings, 15th Earl of Loudoun and Delaval Astley, 23rd Baron Hastings (one each)

==== Bearers of the Sceptre with the Cross ====
- 1189: William Marshal, 1st Earl of Pembroke
- 1661: Edward Montagu, 1st Earl of Sandwich
- 1685: Henry Mordaunt, 2nd Earl of Peterborough
- 1689: George Compton, 4th Earl of Northampton (William III), John Holles, 4th Earl of Clare (Mary II)
- 1702: George Hastings, 8th Earl of Huntingdon
- 1714: Lionel Sackville, 7th Earl of Dorset
- 1727: John Montagu, 2nd Duke of Montagu
- 1761: George Spencer, 4th Duke of Marlborough
- 1821: Richard Wellesley, 1st Marquess Wellesley
- 1831: William Beauclerk, 9th Duke of St Albans
- 1838: William Vane, 1st Duke of Cleveland
- 1902: John Campbell, 9th Duke of Argyll
- 1911: John Campbell, 9th Duke of Argyll
- 1937: Evelyn Seymour, 17th Duke of Somerset
- 1953: Charles Portal, 1st Viscount Portal of Hungerford
- 2023: Richard Scott, 10th Duke of Buccleuch and 12th Duke of Queensberry

==== Bearers of the Sword of State ====
- 1685: Aubrey de Vere, 20th Earl of Oxford
- 1689: Aubrey de Vere, 20th Earl of Oxford
- 1702: Aubrey de Vere, 20th Earl of Oxford
- 1714: James Stanley, 10th Earl of Derby
- 1727: Theophilus Hastings, 9th Earl of Huntingdon
- 1761: Francis Hastings, 10th Earl of Huntingdon
- 1821: Charles Sackville-Germain, 5th Duke of Dorset
- 1831: Charles Grey, 2nd Earl Grey
- 1838: William Lamb, 2nd Viscount Melbourne
- 1902: Charles Vane-Tempest-Stewart, 6th Marquess of Londonderry
- 1911: William Lygon, 7th Earl Beauchamp
- 1937: Lawrence Dundas, 2nd Marquess of Zetland
- 1953: Robert Gascoyne-Cecil, 5th Marquess of Salisbury
- 2023: Penny Mordaunt

==== Bearers of the Pointed Sword of Justice to the Spirituality (Second Sword) ====
- 1685: William Stanley, 9th Earl of Derby
- 1689: William Stanley, 9th Earl of Derby
- 1702: William Stanley, 9th Earl of Derby
- 1714: John Gordon, 16th Earl of Sutherland
- 1727: Henry Clinton, 7th Earl of Lincoln
- 1761: Henry Howard, 12th Earl of Suffolk
- 1821: Hugh Percy, 3rd Duke of Northumberland
- 1831: Arthur Hill, 3rd Marquess of Downshire
- 1838: George Sutherland-Leveson-Gower, 2nd Duke of Sutherland
- 1902: Frederick Roberts, 1st Earl Roberts
- 1911: Frederick Roberts, 1st Earl Roberts
- 1937: George Milne, 1st Baron Milne
- 1953: Alexander Douglas-Home, 14th Earl of Home
- 2023: General David Richards, Baron Richards of Herstmonceux

==== Bearers of the Pointed Sword of Justice to the Temporality (Third Sword) ====
- 1685: Thomas Herbert, 8th Earl of Pembroke
- 1689: Thomas Herbert, 8th Earl of Pembroke
- 1702: Thomas Herbert, 8th Earl of Pembroke
- 1714: Thomas Herbert, 8th Earl of Pembroke
- 1727: John Lindsay, 20th Earl of Crawford
- 1761: William Sutherland, 18th Earl of Sutherland
- 1821: George Stewart, 8th Earl of Galloway
- 1831: William Vane, 1st Marquess of Cleveland
- 1838: Robert Grosvenor, 1st Marquess of Westminster
- 1902: Garnet Wolseley, 1st Viscount Wolseley
- 1911: Herbert Kitchener, 1st Viscount Kitchener
- 1937: Hugh Trenchard, 1st Viscount Trenchard
- 1953: Walter Montagu Douglas Scott, 8th Duke of Buccleuch
- 2023: General Nick Houghton, Baron Houghton of Richmond

==== Bearers of the Sword of Mercy (Curtana) ====
- 1685: Charles Talbot, 12th Earl of Shrewsbury
- 1689: Charles Talbot, 12th Earl of Shrewsbury
- 1702: Anthony Grey, 11th Earl of Kent
- 1714: Henry Clinton, 7th Earl of Lincoln
- 1727: Thomas Herbert, 8th Earl of Pembroke
- 1761: Henry Pelham-Clinton, 9th Earl of Lincoln
- 1821: Henry Pelham-Clinton, 4th Duke of Newcastle-under-Lyne
- 1831: James Gascoyne-Cecil, 2nd Marquess of Salisbury
- 1838: William Cavendish, 6th Duke of Devonshire
- 1902: Augustus FitzRoy, 7th Duke of Grafton
- 1911: Henry Somerset, 9th Duke of Beaufort
- 1937: William Boyle, 12th Earl of Cork
- 1953: Hugh Percy, 10th Duke of Northumberland
- 2023: Air Chief Marshal Stuart Peach, Baron Peach

==== Bearers of the Jewelled Sword of Offering and the Ruby Rings ====
- 1831: Thomas Mash
- 1838: William Martins
- 1902: Sir Henry Gough
- 1911: Sir Hedworth Lambton
- 1937: Sir Lionel Halsey
- 1953: Alexander Hardinge, 2nd Baron Hardinge of Penshurst
- 2023: Amy Taylor (Sword), Andrew Jackson (Sovereign's ring), Richard Chartres, Baron Chartres (Consort's ring), and Ara Darzi, Baron Darzi of Denham (armills)

==== Bearers of the Sceptre with the Dove ====
- 1189: William of Salisbury, 2nd Earl of Salisbury
- 1685: Christopher Monck, 2nd Duke of Albemarle
- 1689: John Manners, 9th Earl of Rutland (William III), William Russell, 5th Earl of Bedford (Mary II)
- 1702: Charles Lennox, 1st Duke of Richmond
- 1714: John Campbell, 2nd Duke of Argyll
- 1727: John Campbell, 2nd Duke of Argyll
- 1761: Charles Lennox, 3rd Duke of Richmond
- 1821: John Manners, 3rd Duke of Rutland
- 1831: Charles Gordon-Lennox, 5th Duke of Richmond
- 1838: Charles Gordon-Lennox, 5th Duke of Richmond
- 1902: Charles Bingham, 4th Earl of Lucan
- 1911: Charles Gordon-Lennox, 7th Duke of Richmond
- 1937: Frederick Gordon-Lennox, 9th Duke of Richmond
- 1953: Frederick Gordon-Lennox, 9th Duke of Richmond
- 2023: Floella Benjamin, Baroness Benjamin

==== Bearers of the Orb ====
- 1661: George Villiers, 2nd Duke of Buckingham
- 1685: Charles Seymour, 6th Duke of Somerset
- 1689: Henry FitzRoy, 1st Duke of Grafton (William III), Charles Paulet, 1st Duke of Bolton (Mary II)
- 1702: Charles Seymour, 6th Duke of Somerset
- 1714: Charles Seymour, 6th Duke of Somerset
- 1727: Charles Seymour, 6th Duke of Somerset
- 1761: Edward Seymour, 9th Duke of Somerset
- 1821: William Cavendish, 6th Duke of Devonshire
- 1831: Edward St Maur, 11th Duke of Somerset
- 1838: Edward St Maur, 11th Duke of Somerset
- 1902: Algernon Seymour, 15th Duke of Somerset
- 1911: Algernon Seymour, 15th Duke of Somerset
- 1937: George Sutherland-Leveson-Gower, 5th Duke of Sutherland
- 1953: Harold Alexander, 1st Earl Alexander of Tunis
- 2023: Dame Elizabeth Anionwu

=== Consort's regalia ===
==== Bearers of the consort's crown ====
- 1685: Henry Somerset, 1st Duke of Beaufort
- 1689: None (William III and Mary II were co-monarchs)
- 1702: Not used for male consorts
- 1714: None (Sophia of Celle was imprisoned)
- 1727: Charles Beauclerk, 2nd Duke of St Albans
- 1761: Charles Powlett, 5th Duke of Bolton
- 1821: None (Queen Caroline was forbidden to attend the coronation)
- 1831: Henry Somerset, 6th Duke of Beaufort
- 1838: None
- 1902: Henry Innes-Ker, 8th Duke of Roxburghe
- 1911: Victor Cavendish, 9th Duke of Devonshire
- 1937: William Cavendish-Bentinck, 6th Duke of Portland
- 1953: Not used for male consorts
- 2023: Charles Wellesley, 9th Duke of Wellington

==== Bearers of the consort's Sceptre with the Cross ====
- 1685: John Manners, 9th Earl of Rutland
- 1689: None (William III and Mary II were co-monarchs)
- 1702: Not used for male consorts
- 1714: None (Sophia of Celle was in imprisonment)
- 1727: John Manners, 3rd Duke of Rutland
- 1761: John Manners, 3rd Duke of Rutland
- 1821: None (Queen Caroline was not permitted to attend the coronation)
- 1831: George Child-Villiers, 5th Earl of Jersey
- 1838: None
- 1902: George Harris, 4th Baron Harris
- 1911: Henry Beresford, 6th Marquess of Waterford
- 1937: John Manners, 9th Duke of Rutland
- 1953: Not used for male consorts
- 2023: General Sir Patrick Sanders

==== Bearers of the Ivory Rod with the Dove ====
- 1483: Edward Grey, 1st Viscount Lisle
- 1685: Charles Sackville, 6th Earl of Dorset
- 1689: None (William III and Mary II were co-monarchs)
- 1702: Not used for male consorts
- 1714: None (Sophia of Celle was in imprisonment)
- 1727: James Compton, 5th Earl of Northampton
- 1761: Charles Compton, 7th Earl of Northampton
- 1821: None (Queen Caroline was not permitted to attend the coronation)
- 1831: John Campbell, 1st Earl Cawdor
- 1838: None
- 1902: Archibald Acheson, 4th Earl of Gosford
- 1911: John Lambton, 3rd Earl of Durham
- 1937: George Baillie-Hamilton, 12th Earl of Haddington
- 1953: Not used for male consorts
- 2023: Helena Kennedy, Baroness Kennedy of The Shaws

== Great Officers of State ==
=== Lord High Chancellors of Great Britain ===
- 1714: William Cowper, 1st Baron Cowper
- 1727: Peter King, 1st Baron King
- 1761: Robert Henley, 1st Baron Henley
- 1821: John Scott, 1st Baron Eldon
- 1831: Henry Peter Brougham, 1st Baron Brougham and Vaux
- 1838: Charles Christopher Pepys, 1st Baron Cottenham
- 1902: Hardinge Stanley Giffard, 1st Earl of Halsbury
- 1911: Robert Threshie Reid, 1st Baron Loreburn
- 1937: Douglas McGarel Hogg, 1st Viscount Hailsham
- 1953: Gavin Turnbull Simonds, 1st Baron Simonds
- 2023: Alex Chalk

=== Lord Presidents of the Council ===
- 1689: Thomas Osborne, 1st Marquess of Carmarthen
- 1727: William Cavendish, 2nd Duke of Devonshire
- 1821: Dudley Ryder, 1st Earl of Harrowby
- 1831: Henry Petty-Fitzmaurice, 3rd Marquess of Lansdowne
- 1838: Henry Petty-Fitzmaurice, 3rd Marquess of Lansdowne
- 1902: Spencer Cavendish, 8th Duke of Devonshire
- 1911: John Morley, 1st Viscount Morley of Blackburn
- 1937: Ramsay MacDonald
- 1953: Robert Gascoyne-Cecil, 5th Marquess of Salisbury (Carried the Sword of State)
- 2023: Penny Mordaunt (Carried the Sword of State)

=== Lord Privy Seals ===
- 1689: George Savile, 1st Marquess of Halifax
- 1702: John Sheffield, 1st Marquess of Normanby
- 1714: Thomas Wharton, 1st Earl of Wharton
- 1727: Thomas Trevor, 1st Baron Trevor
- 1761: Richard Grenville-Temple, 2nd Earl Temple
- 1821: John Fane, 10th Earl of Westmorland
- 1831: John Lambton, 1st Baron Durham
- 1902: Arthur Balfour
- 1911: Robert Crewe-Milnes, 1st Earl of Crewe (One of the Garter Knights who carried the Canopy)
- 1937: Edward Wood, 1st Earl of Halifax (Carried St. Edward's Staff)
- 1953: Harry Crookshank
- 2023: Nicholas True, Baron True

=== Lord Great Chamberlains of England, or their Deputies ===
- 1714: Robert Bertie, 1st Marquess of Lindsey
- 1727: Peregrine Bertie, 2nd Duke of Ancaster and Kesteven
- 1761: Peregrine Bertie, 3rd Duke of Ancaster and Kesteven
- 1821: Peter Drummond-Burrell, 2nd Baron Gwydyr
- 1831: George Horatio Cholmondeley, 2nd Marquess of Cholmondeley
- 1838: Peter Drummond-Willoughby, 22nd Baron Willoughby de Eresby
- 1902: George Henry Hugh Cholmondeley, 4th Marquess of Cholmondeley
- 1911: Charles Wynn-Carington, 1st Earl Carrington
- 1937: Gilbert Heathcote-Drummond-Willoughby, 2nd Earl of Ancaster
- 1953: George Horatio Charles Cholmondeley, 5th Marquess of Cholmondeley
- 2023: Rupert Carington, 7th Baron Carrington

=== Lord High Constables of England ===
- 1714: John Montagu, 2nd Duke of Montagu
- 1727: Charles Lennox, 2nd Duke of Richmond
- 1761: John Russell, 4th Duke of Bedford
- 1821: Arthur Wellesley, 1st Duke of Wellington
- 1831: Arthur Wellesley, 1st Duke of Wellington
- 1838: Arthur Wellesley, 1st Duke of Wellington
- 1902: Alexander William George Duff, 1st Duke of Fife
- 1911: Alexander William George Duff, 1st Duke of Fife
- 1937: Robert Offley Ashburton Crewe-Milnes, 1st Marquess of Crewe
- 1953: Alan Francis Brooke, 1st Viscount Alanbrooke
- 2023: Admiral Sir Antony Radakin

=== Earls Marshal of England, or their Deputies ===
- 1714: Henry Howard, 6th Earl of Suffolk (deputy to Thomas Howard, 8th Duke of Norfolk)
- 1727: Talbot Yelverton, 1st Earl of Sussex (deputy to Thomas Howard, 8th Duke of Norfolk)
- 1761: Thomas Howard, 2nd Earl of Effingham (deputy to Edward Howard, 9th Duke of Norfolk)
- 1821: Kenneth Howard, 11th Baron Howard of Effingham (deputy to Bernard Howard, 12th Duke of Norfolk)
- 1831: Bernard Edward Howard, 12th Duke of Norfolk
- 1838: Bernard Edward Howard, 12th Duke of Norfolk
- 1902: Henry Fitzalan-Howard, 15th Duke of Norfolk
- 1911: Henry Fitzalan-Howard, 15th Duke of Norfolk
- 1937: Bernard Marmaduke Fitzalan-Howard, 16th Duke of Norfolk
- 1953: Bernard Marmaduke Fitzalan-Howard, 16th Duke of Norfolk
- 2023: Edward Fitzalan-Howard, 18th Duke of Norfolk

=== Great Stewards of Scotland, or their Deputies ===
- 1902: James Lindsay, 26th Earl of Crawford (deputy to George, Duke of Rothesay)
- 1911: James Lindsay, 26th Earl of Crawford (deputy to Edward, Duke of Rothesay)
- 1953: David Lindsay, 28th Earl of Crawford (deputy to Charles, Duke of Rothesay)
- 2023: Anthony Lindsay, 30th Earl of Crawford (deputy to William, Duke of Rothesay)

=== Lord High Constables of Scotland, or their Deputies ===
- 1727: John Ker, 1st Duke of Roxburghe (deputy to Mary Hay, 14th Countess of Erroll)
- 1761: James Hay, 15th Earl of Erroll
- 1821: George Gordon, Marquess of Huntly (deputy to William Hay, 18th Earl of Erroll)
- 1831: William Hay, 18th Earl of Erroll
- 1838: William Hay, 18th Earl of Erroll
- 1902: Charles Hay, 20th Earl of Erroll
- 1911: Charles Hay, 20th Earl of Erroll
- 1937: Josslyn Hay, 22nd Earl of Erroll
- 1953: Gilbert Boyd, 6th Baron Kilmarnock (deputy to Diana Hay, 23rd Countess of Erroll)
- 2023: Merlin Hay, 24th Earl of Erroll

=== Lord Chancellors of Ireland ===
- 1831: William Plunket, 1st Baron Plunket
- 1838: William Plunket, 1st Baron Plunket
- 1902: Edward Gibson, 1st Baron Ashbourne
- 1911: Sir Samuel Walker, 1st Baronet

=== Lord High Stewards of Ireland ===
- 1902: Charles Chetwynd-Talbot, 20th Earl of Shrewsbury
- 1911: Charles Chetwynd-Talbot, 20th Earl of Shrewsbury
- 1937: John Chetwynd-Talbot, 21st Earl of Shrewsbury
- 1953: John Chetwynd-Talbot, 21st Earl of Shrewsbury
- 2023: None (Charles Chetwynd-Talbot, 22nd Earl of Shrewsbury was suspended from the House of Lords)

=== Lord High Constables of Ireland ===
- 1821: Henry Petty-Fitzmaurice, 3rd Marquess of Lansdowne
- 1831: Augustus FitzGerald, 3rd Duke of Leinster
- 1838: Augustus FitzGerald, 3rd Duke of Leinster
- 1902: James Hamilton, 2nd Duke of Abercorn
- 1911: James Hamilton, 2nd Duke of Abercorn

== Royal Household ==
=== Lord Stewards ===
- 1685: James Butler, 1st Duke of Ormond (also Lord High Steward)
- 1689: William Cavendish, 4th Earl of Devonshire (also Lord High Steward)
- 1702: William Cavendish, 1st Duke of Devonshire (also Lord High Steward)
- 1727: Lionel Sackville, 1st Duke of Dorset (also Lord High Steward)
- 1761: William Talbot, Earl Talbot (also Lord High Steward)
- 1821: George Cholmondeley, 1st Marquess of Cholmondeley
- 1831: Cropley Ashley-Cooper, 6th Earl of Shaftesbury (acting for Richard Wellesley, 1st Marquess Wellesley)
- 1838: George Campbell, 6th Duke of Argyll
- 1902: Sidney Herbert, 14th Earl of Pembroke
- 1911: Edwyn Scudamore-Stanhope, 10th Earl of Chesterfield
- 1937: Walter Montagu Douglas Scott, 8th Duke of Buccleuch
- 1953: Douglas Douglas-Hamilton, 14th Duke of Hamilton
- 2023: Peter St Clair-Erskine, 7th Earl of Rosslyn

=== Lord Chamberlains ===
- 1702: Edward Villiers, 1st Earl of Jersey
- 1727: Charles FitzRoy, 2nd Duke of Grafton
- 1761: William Cavendish, 4th Duke of Devonshire
- 1821: James Graham, Marquess of Graham (acting for Francis Ingram-Seymour-Conway, 2nd Marquess of Hertford)
- 1831: William Cavendish, 6th Duke of Devonshire
- 1838: George Chichester, Earl of Belfast (acting for Francis Conyngham, 2nd Marquess Conyngham)
- 1902: Victor Spencer, 1st Viscount Churchill (acting for Edward Villiers, 5th Earl of Clarendon)
- 1911: Charles Spencer, 6th Earl Spencer
- 1937: Rowland Baring, 2nd Earl of Cromer
- 1953: Roger Lumley, 11th Earl of Scarbrough
- 2023: Andrew Parker, Baron Parker of Minsmere

=== Masters of the Horse ===
- 1821: James Graham, 3rd Duke of Montrose
- 1831: William Keppel, 4th Earl of Albemarle
- 1838: William Keppel, 4th Earl of Albemarle
- 1902: William Cavendish-Bentinck, 6th Duke of Portland
- 1911: Bernard Forbes, 8th Earl of Granard
- 1937: Henry Somerset, 10th Duke of Beaufort
- 1953: Henry Somerset, 10th Duke of Beaufort
- 2023: Rupert Ponsonby, 7th Baron de Mauley

=== Gold Sticks-in-Waiting ===
- 1821: Charles Stanhope, 3rd Earl of Harrington (carried the Royal Standard)
- 1831: Stapleton Cotton, 1st Viscount Combermere
- 1838: Stapleton Cotton, 1st Viscount Combermere
- 1902: Frederic Thesiger, 2nd Baron Chelmsford
- 1911: Douglas Cochrane, 12th Earl of Dundonald
- 1937: Sir William Birdwood, 1st Baronet
- 1953: Richard Howard-Vyse
- 2023: Anne, Princess Royal

=== Captains of the Honourable Corps of Gentlemen-at-Arms ===
- 1685: Theophilus Hastings, 7th Earl of Huntingdon
- 1689: John Lovelace, 3rd Baron Lovelace
- 1702: Charles Beauclerk, 1st Duke of St Albans
- 1714: Charles Beauclerk, 1st Duke of St Albans
- 1727: William Cavendish, Marquess of Hartington
- 1761: John Berkeley, 5th Baron Berkeley of Stratton
- 1821: James Stopford, 3rd Earl of Courtown
- 1831: Thomas Foley, 3rd Baron Foley
- 1838: Thomas Foley, 4th Baron Foley
- 1902: Henry Strutt, 2nd Baron Belper
- 1911: Thomas Denman, 3rd Baron Denman
- 1937: George Bingham, 5th Earl of Lucan
- 1953: Hugh Fortescue, 5th Earl Fortescue (one of the Garter Knights who carried the canopy)
- 2023: Susan Williams, Baroness Williams of Trafford

=== Captains of the Yeomen of the Guard ===
- 1685: George Villiers, 4th Viscount Grandison
- 1689: Charles Montagu, 4th Earl of Manchester
- 1702: William Cavendish, Marquess of Hartington
- 1714: Henry Paget, 9th Baron Paget
- 1727: John Sidney, 6th Earl of Leicester
- 1761: Hugh Boscawen, 2nd Viscount Falmouth
- 1821: George Parker, 4th Earl of Macclesfield
- 1831: Ulick de Burgh, 1st Marquess of Clanricarde
- 1838: Henry Fox-Strangways, 3rd Earl of Ilchester
- 1902: William Waldegrave, 9th Earl Waldegrave
- 1911: Wentworth Beaumont, 2nd Baron Allendale
- 1937: Arthur Chichester, 4th Baron Templemore
- 1953: William Onslow, 6th Earl of Onslow
- 2023: Patrick Stopford, 9th Earl of Courtown

=== Captains-General of the Royal Company of Archers ===
- 1838: Walter Montagu Douglas Scott, 5th Duke of Buccleuch
- 1902: William Montagu Douglas Scott, 6th Duke of Buccleuch
- 1911: William Montagu Douglas Scott, 6th Duke of Buccleuch
- 1937: Sidney Elphinstone, 16th Lord Elphinstone
- 1953: John Dalrymple, 12th Earl of Stair
- 2023: James Ramsay, 17th Earl of Dalhousie (deputy to Richard Scott, 10th Duke of Buccleuch, who carried the Sceptre with Cross)

=== Ushers of the Black Rod ===
- 1685: Thomas Duppa
- 1689: Thomas Duppa
- 1702: David Mitchell
- 1714: William Oldes
- 1727: Charles Dalton
- 1761: Septimus Robinson
- 1821: Thomas Tyrwhitt
- 1831: Thomas Tyrwhitt
- 1838: Augustus Clifford
- 1902: Michael Biddulph
- 1911: Henry Frederick Stephenson
- 1937: William Pulteney
- 1953: Brian Horrocks
- 2023: Sarah Clarke

=== Vice-Admirals of the United Kingdom ===
- 1902: Sir Michael Culme-Seymour, 3rd Baronet
- 1911: Sir Michael Culme-Seymour, 3rd Baronet
- 1937: Stanley Colville
- 1953: Martin Dunbar-Nasmith

=== Rear-Admirals of the United Kingdom ===
- 1911: Edmund Fremantle
- 1953: Percy Noble
- 2023: Gordon Messenger (served as Lord High Steward)

=== Lord Chamberlains to Consort ===
- 1685: Sidney Godolphin, 1st Baron Godolphin
- 1688: None
- 1702: None
- 1714: None
- 1727: Henry de Nassau d'Auverquerque, 1st Earl of Grantham
- 1761: Robert Montagu, 3rd Duke of Manchester
- 1821: None
- 1831: Richard Curzon-Howe, 1st Earl Howe
- 1838: None
- 1902: Charles Colville, 1st Viscount Colville of Culross
- 1911: Anthony Ashley-Cooper, 9th Earl of Shaftesbury
- 1937: David Ogilvy, 12th Earl of Airlie
- 1953: None
- 2023: None

== Miscellaneous ==
=== Monarch's train ===
- 1685: Arthur Herbert and four eldest sons of earls.
- 1689: Lord Eland, Lord Willoughby, Lord Lansdowne, Lord Dunblane and the Master of the Robes
- 1714: Viscount Walden, Viscount Mandeville, Viscount Rialton, Lord Ogilvy of Deskford and Thomas Coke
- 1727: Viscount Hermitage, Lord Brudenell, Viscount Cornbury, Earl of Euston, Augustus Schutz
- 1761: Viscount Mandeville, Marquess of Hartington, Lord Howard, Lord Grey, Viscount Beauchamp, Viscount Nuneham, Hon. James Brudenell
- 1821: Earl of Surrey, Marquess of Douro, Viscount Cranborne, Earl of Brecnock, Earl of Uxbridge, Earl of Rocksavage, Earl of Rawdon, Viscount Ingestre and Lord Francis Conyngham
- 1831: Marquess of Worcester, Earl of Euston, Earl of Kerry, Marquess of Titchfield, Marquess of Douro again and Sir George Seymour.
- 1838: Lady Adelaide Paget, Lady Frances Cowper, Lady Anne Wentworth-FitzWilliam, Lady Mary Grimston, Lady Caroline Gordon-Lennox, Lady Mary Talbot, Lady Wilhelmina Stanhope, Lady Louisa Jenkinson, Francis Conyngham, 2nd Marquess Conyngham
- 1902: Lionel Dawson-Damer, 6th Earl of Portarlington, Maurice FitzGerald, 6th Duke of Leinster, George Venables-Vernon, 8th Baron Vernon, Harold Festing, Victor Conyngham, 5th Marquess Conyngham, Eric Alexander, 5th Earl of Caledon, Arthur Somers-Cocks, 6th Baron Somers, Hon. Victor Spencer, Charles Harbord, 5th Baron Suffield
- 1911: David Ogilvy, 12th Earl of Airlie, William Romilly, 4th Baron Romilly, Anthony Lowther, Victor Harbord, Marquess of Hartington, Viscount Cranborne, Hon. Edward Knollys, Walter Campbell, Victor Spencer, 1st Viscount Churchill
- 1937: George Haig, 2nd Earl Haig, Alexander Ramsay, George Seymour, Robert Eliot, Henry Kitchener, 3rd Earl Kitchener, Viscount Lascelles, George Hardinge, Rognvald Herschell, 3rd Baron Herschell, George Jellicoe, 2nd Earl Jellicoe
- 1953: Lady Jane Vane-Tempest-Stewart, Lady Anne Coke, Lady Moyra Campbell, Lady Mary Baillie-Hamilton, Lady Jane Heathcote-Drummond-Willoughby, Lady Rosemary Spencer-Churchill, Mary Cavendish, Duchess of Devonshire
- 2023: Prince George of Wales, Lord Oliver Cholmondeley, Master Nicholas Barclay, Master Ralph Tollemache

=== Consort's train ===
- 1685: Mary Howard, Duchess of Norfolk and four earls' daughters.
- 1689: Elizabeth Seymour, Duchess of Somerset, Lady Elizabeth Paulet, Lady Diana Vere, Lady Elizabeth Cavendish and Lady Henrietta Hyde
- 1702: Not used for male consorts
- 1714: None (Sophia Dorothea of Celle had been divorced in 1694 and was under house confinement.)
- 1727: Anne, Princess Royal and Princess of Orange, Princess Amelia, Princess Caroline, Lady Frances de Nassau d'Auverquerque, Lady Mary Capell, Lady Rebecca Herbert, Lady Anne Hastings
- 1761: Lady Mary Grey, Lady Elizabeth Montague, Lady Jane Stuart, Lady Selina Hastings, Lady Heneage Finch, Lady Mary Douglas, Princess Augusta
- 1821: None (Queen Caroline was not permitted to attend the coronation.)
- 1831: Elizabeth Gordon, Duchess of Gordon, Lady Georgiana Bathurst, Lady Teresa Fox-Strangways, Lady Mary Pelham, Lady Theodosia Brabson, Lady Sophia Cust, Lady Georgiana Grey
- 1838: None
- 1902: Louisa Montagu Douglas Scott, Duchess of Buccleuch, J. N. Bigge, George Parker, 7th Earl of Macclesfield, Edward Lascelles, Robert Palmer, George Byng, 9th Viscount Torrington, George Sutherland-Leveson-Gower, Marquess of Stafford, Lord Claud Hamilton, Arthur Anson
- 1911: Evelyn Cavendish, Duchess of Devonshire Lady Eileen Butler, Lady Eileen Knox, Lady Victoria Carrington, Lady Mabell Ogilvy, Lady Dorothy Browne, Lady Mary Dawson
- 1937: Helen Percy, Duchess of Northumberland, Lady Ursula Manners, Lady Diana Legge, Lady Elizabeth Percy, Lady Iris Mountbatten
- 1953: Not used for male consorts
- 2023: Master Frederick Parker Bowles, Master Gus Lopes, Master Louis Lopes and Master Arthur Elliot.

=== Bearers of the Pall of Gold ===
Carried by four Knights of the Garter up to and including 1953:

- 1761: William Cavendish, 4th Duke of Devonshire, Hugh Percy, 2nd Earl of Northumberland, Francis Seymour-Conway, 1st Earl of Hertford and James Waldegrave, 2nd Earl Waldegrave.
- 1821: Henry Somerset, 6th Duke of Beaufort, John Pratt, 1st Marquess Camden, George Finch, 9th Earl of Winchilsea and Robert Stewart, 2nd Marquess of Londonderry.
- 1831: George Osborne, 6th Duke of Leeds, Charles Sackville-Germain, 5th Duke of Dorset, John Pratt, 1st Marquess Camden and Brownlow Cecil, 2nd Marquess of Exeter.
- 1838: John Manners, 5th Duke of Rutland, Walter Montagu-Douglas-Scott, 5th Duke of Buccleuch, Henry Paget, 1st Marquess of Anglesey and Brownlow Cecil, 2nd Marquess of Exeter.
- 1902: George Cadogan, 5th Earl Cadogan, Frederick Stanley, 16th Earl of Derby, Archibald Primrose, 5th Earl of Rosebery and John Spencer, 5th Earl Spencer.
- 1911: George Cadogan, 5th Earl Cadogan, Robert Crewe-Milnes, 1st Earl of Crewe, Gilbert Elliot-Murray-Kynynmound, 4th Earl of Minto and Archibald Primrose, 5th Earl of Rosebery.
- 1937: James Hamilton, 3rd Duke of Abercorn, Charles Vane-Tempest-Stewart, 7th Marquess of Londonderry, Victor Bulwer-Lytton, 2nd Earl of Lytton and James Stanhope, 7th Earl Stanhope.
- 1953: Gerald Wellesley, 7th Duke of Wellington, William Cavendish-Bentinck, 7th Duke of Portland, Hugh Fortescue, 5th Earl Fortescue and Wentworth Beaumont, 2nd Viscount Allendale.
- 2023: Four officers of the Household Division carried screens in lieu of the pall of gold.

=== Bearers of the consort's Pall of Cloth of Gold ===
- 1821: None (Queen Caroline was not permitted to attend the coronation)
- 1831: Caroline Lennox, Duchess of Richmond, Caroline Graham, Duchess of Montrose, Charlotte Percy, Duchess of Northumberland, and Louisa Petty-Fitzmaurice, Marchioness of Lansdowne
- 1838: None
- 1902: Consuelo Spencer-Churchill, Duchess of Marlborough, Violet Graham, Duchess of Montrose, Winifred Cavendish-Bentinck, Duchess of Portland, and Millicent Leveson-Gower, Duchess of Sutherland
- 1911: Nina Douglas-Hamilton, Duchess of Hamilton, Violet Graham, Duchess of Montrose, Winifred Cavendish-Bentinck, Duchess of Portland, and Millicent Leveson-Gower, Duchess of Sutherland
- 1937: Lavinia Fitzalan-Howard, Duchess of Norfolk, Kathleen Manners, Duchess of Rutland, Mary Montagu Douglas Scott, Duchess of Buccleuch, and Mary Innes-Ker, Duchess of Roxburghe
- 1953: Not used for male consorts
- 2023: None (anointing held in public view)

=== Bearers of the Paten ===
- 1689: William Lloyd, Bishop of St Asaph
- 1702: Gilbert Burnet, Bishop of Salisbury
- 1714: John Hough, Bishop of Lichfield and Coventry
- 1727: Not processed
- 1761: Zachary Pearce, Bishop of Rochester
- 1821: Bishop of Gloucester
- 1831: George Murray, Bishop of Rochester
- 1838: Christopher Bethell, Bishop of Bangor
- 1902: Lord Alwynee Compton, Bishop of Ely
- 1911: Arthur Winnington-Ingram, Bishop of London
- 1937: Arthur Winnington-Ingram, Bishop of London
- 1953: John W C Wand, Bishop of London
- 2023: Rose Hudson-Wilkin, Bishop of Dover

=== Bearers of the Bible ===
- 1689: Henry Compton, Bishop of London
- 1702: William Lloyd, Bishop of Worcester
- 1714: Gilbert Burnet, Bishop of Salisbury
- 1727: Edward Chandler, Bishop of Lichfield and Coventry
- 1761: Richard Osbaldeston, Bishop of Carlisle
- 1821: Bowyer Sparke, Bishop of Ely
- 1831: Henry Phillpotts, Bishop of Exeter
- 1838: Charles Sumner, Bishop of Winchester
- 1902: Arthur Winnington-Ingram, Bishop of London
- 1911: William Carpenter, Bishop of Ripon
- 1937: Bertram Pollock, Bishop of Norwich
- 1953: Percy Herbert, Bishop of Norwich
- 2023: Hosam Naoum, Archbishop in Jerusalem

=== Bearers of the Chalice ===
- 1689: Thomas Sprat, Bishop of Rochester
- 1702: Thomas Sprat, Bishop of Rochester
- 1714: John Evans, Bishop of Bangor
- 1727: Not processed
- 1761: Edmund Keene, Bishop of Chester
- 1821: George Henry Law, Bishop of Chester
- 1831: Richard Bagot, Bishop of Oxford
- 1838: John Kaye, Bishop of Lincoln
- 1902: Randall Davidson, Bishop of Winchester
- 1911: Edward Talbot, Bishop of Winchester
- 1937: Cyril Garbett, Bishop of Winchester
- 1953: Alwyn Williams, Bishop of Winchester
- 2023: Guli Francis-Dehqani, Bishop of Chelmsford

=== Lords of the Manor of Worksop ===
- 1761: Charles Watson-Wentworth, 2nd Marquess of Rockingham (as Deputy to Edward Howard, 9th Duke of Norfolk)
- 1821: Bernard Howard, 12th Duke of Norfolk
- 1831: Bernard Howard, 12th Duke of Norfolk
- 1838: Bernard Howard, 12th Duke of Norfolk
- 1902: Henry Pelham-Clinton, 7th Duke of Newcastle-under-Lyne
- 1911: Henry Pelham-Clinton, 7th Duke of Newcastle-under-Lyne
- 1937: Henry Pelham-Clinton, Earl of Lincoln (as deputy to his father, Francis Pelham-Clinton-Hope, 8th Duke of Newcastle-under-Lyne)
- 1953: None (Frederick Marquis, 1st Viscount Woolton presented the glove)
- 2023: None (Indarjit Singh, Baron Singh of Wimbledon presented the glove)

=== Lord Mayors of London ===
- 1685: James Smyth
- 1689: John Chapman
- 1702: Sir William Gore
- 1714: Samuel Stanier
- 1727: Sir John Eyles, 2nd Baronet
- 1761: Matthew Blakiston
- 1821: John Thomas Thorp
- 1902: Sir Joseph Dimsdale, 1st Baronet
- 1911: Vezey Strong
- 1937: George Broadbridge
- 1953: Sir Noël Bowater, 2nd Baronet
- 2023: Nicholas Lyons

== Coronation banquet ==
=== Chief Larderer ===
- 1399: Edmund de la Chambre
- 1509: George Nevill, 5th Baron Bergavenny
- 1533: George Nevill, 5th Baron Bergavenny
- 1553: Henry Nevill, 6th Baron Bergavenny
- 1661: William Maynard, 2nd Baron Maynard
- 1685: George Nevill, 12th Baron Bergavenny
- 1689: William Maynard, 2nd Baron Maynard
- 1702: George Nevill, 13th Baron Bergavenny
