= George Manners Astley, 20th Baron Hastings =

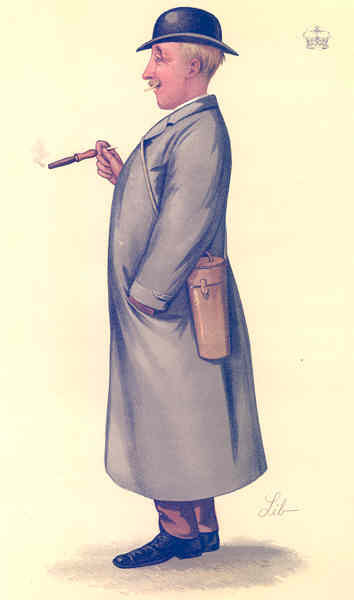
"Melton". Caricature of Lord Hastings by Lib published in Vanity Fair on 24 July 1886.

George Manners Astley, 20th Baron Hastings, 10th Baronet Astley (4 April 1857 – 18 September 1904) succeeded to the Hastings barony upon the death of his unmarried brother in 1875.

== Biography ==
George Manners Astley was born in 1857 at Melton Constable Hall in Norfolk, the son of Sir Delaval Loftus Astley, 18th Baron Hastings and Hon. Frances Diana Manners-Sutton. The Anglo-Norman Hastings barony was established in the year 1295, but was dormant from 1389, with multiple claimants, and then became abeyant from 1542. The barony was revived for Jacob Astley in 1841, who became the 16th Baron. George Manners Astley was educated at Eton and at Trinity College, Cambridge. On 17 April 1880, Lord Hastings married Hon. Elizabeth Evelyn Harbord, daughter of Charles Harbord, 5th Baron Suffield and Cecilia Annetta Baring. Lord Hastings and his wife had 3 sons and 3 daughters. He served as an officer in the Norfolk Artillery Militia commanded by his father-in-law and previously by his uncle the 17th Baron, and in which his younger brother also served. Hastings is famous as the breeder and owner of the Thoroughbred racehorse and sire Melton, winner in 1885 of both The Derby and the St. Leger Stakes. Hastings died aged 47 and was succeeded by his son, Albert Edward Delaval Astley, 21st Baron Hastings. His funeral took place at Melton Constable Church on 22 September 1904 in the absence of his heir, who was on his way home from South Africa by the steamship Norman.

His wife Elizabeth Harbord is commemorated in the name of Harbord Terrace, a row of workers' houses just west of the northern seat of Lord Hastings at Seaton Delaval Hall in Northumberland.

Peerage of England
Preceded by Bernard Edward Delaval Astley	Baron Hastings; 1875–1904	Succeeded by Albert Edward Delaval Astley
