= Edward Astley, 22nd Baron Hastings =

English peer and government minister (1912–2007)

The Right Honourable The Lord Hastings
- Born: Edward Delaval Henry Astley; 14 April 1912
- Died: 25 April 2007 (aged 95)
- Children: Delaval Astley; Justin Astley and Harriet Astley
- Parent(s): Albert Astley; Marguerite Nevill

Edward Delaval Henry Astley, 22nd Baron Hastings, 12th Baronet Astley (14 April 1912 – 25 April 2007) was an English peer and government minister. He had many interests, including politics, ballet, charity work, Italy, and renovating Seaton Delaval Hall.

== Early life ==
Lord Hastings was born at Melton Constable Hall in Norfolk, the son of Albert Astley, 21st Baron Hastings, and Marguerite Nevill, daughter of the 3rd Marquess of Abergavenny. The ancient Hastings barony had been established in 1290, but lay dormant from 1389, when there were multiple claimants, and then abeyant from 1542. It was revived for Jacob Astley in 1841, who became the 16th Baron.

He was educated at Eton, but his father decided that he was not clever enough to attend Cambridge University. He was sent to learn French and Spanish overseas. He was a friend of Sarah Churchill, daughter of Winston Churchill.

== Career ==
=== Early career and military service ===
He worked for the Gold Coast Selection Trust in the City of London, and joined the supplementary reserve of the Coldstream Guards in the 1930s. He spent 14 months in the United States, taking a road trip of 22,000 miles (35,000 km) in a Ford V-8. He returned to England when the Second World War broke out, arriving home shortly before the evacuation from Dunkirk. He transferred to Intelligence Corps, and was posted to North Africa and then Italy, where his language skills became valuable. He ran radio and theatre services in liberated Italy.

=== Rhodesia ===
Back in England, he became a director of London and Eastern Trade Bank, before leaving London to run a 5,000-acre (20 km^{2}) farm near Salisbury in Southern Rhodesia, growing Virginia tobacco, maize, peanuts and pasture seed. He became active in the local United Party. He met his wife, the former model Katie Hinton (known as Nicki), daughter of Captain H. V. Hinton, in Africa. They married in 1954 and honeymooned on Elba, where he later built a holiday villa for his family, including three children and his two stepchildren. He supported Garfield Todd's United Rhodesia party.

== 22nd Baron Hastings ==
He spent more time in England after he succeeded to the titles on his father's death in 1956. While the family seat, Melton Constable Hall in Norfolk, had been sold to the Duke of Westminster in 1948, Hastings took up residence at Fulmodeston Hall in the same county. Having taken up his seat in the House of Lords, he became a government whip in the Conservative administrations of Harold Macmillan and Alec Douglas-Home from 1961 to 1962 and from 1962 to 1964 was Parliamentary Secretary to Sir Keith Joseph, the Minister of Housing and Local Government.

Hastings joined the Opposition front bench after Labour won the 1964 general election, attacking the new Land Commission, which he likened to land nationalisation. He took under his wing the Bills that ultimately became the Clean Air Act 1968 and the Water Resources Act 1968. He criticised Labour's policies towards Rhodesia, particularly economic sanctions, and continued to run his farm there through the years of unilateral independence and civil war, finally selling it to the new Government of Zimbabwe in 1982.

Hastings sat in the House of Lords until the House of Lords Act 1999 removed most of the hereditary peers.

== Patronage ==
He developed a love of ballet after seeing the Ballets Russes at Covent Garden in the 1930s. He was a governor of the Royal Ballet from 1979 to 1992. He became a trustee of the Sadler's Wells Ballet Fund set up by Ninette de Valois, chairman of the Royal Ballet Benevolent Fund from 1966 to 1983, and chairman of the Dance Teachers' Benevolent Fund from 1982 to 1999.

His second son Justin was born with Down's syndrome. He became patron of the Camphill Villages Trust, donating Thornage Hall near Fakenham in Norfolk and surrounding land. He was a vice-president of the British Epilepsy Association from 1962 to 1964, president from 1965 to 1993, and then honorary past president until his death in 2007. The Association named its highest award the Lord Hastings Award in his honour. He was also president of the Epilepsy Research Foundation and the Joint Epilepsy Council.

He was a governor and vice-chairman of the British Institute of Florence for almost 40 years, from 1959 to 1997. He was president of the British-Italian Society from 1967 to 1995. He launched the Italian People's Flood Appeal to help Italians caught up in floods in the 1960s, to supplement other charities, such as the Venice in Peril Fund, which were established to conserve artworks. For this work, he was appointed a Grand Officer of the Italian Order of Merit in 1968.

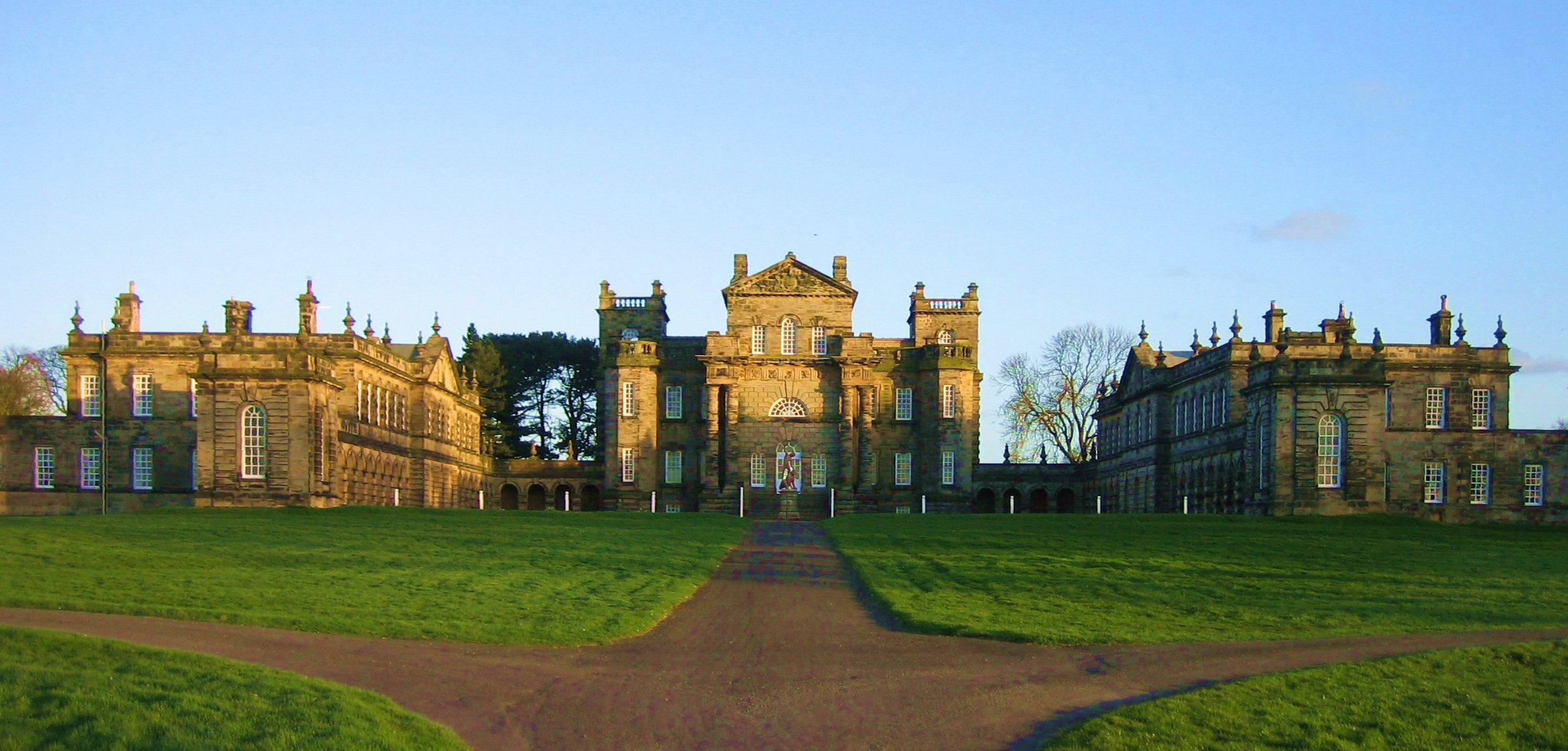
Seaton Delaval Hall viewed from the north.

== Seaton Delaval Hall ==
He spent 51 years restoring Seaton Delaval Hall in Northumberland, an outstanding example of English Baroque architecture, designed by Sir John Vanbrugh in 1718 for Admiral George Delaval. It had been badly damaged by fire in 1822, and used as a prisoner of war camp in the Second World War. The central block and west wing were repaired and refurbished, and a parterre laid out. The house opened to the public. It became his permanent home in 1990.

== Death ==
Hastings died aged 95 and was succeeded by his son, Delaval Astley, 23rd Baron Hastings.

Peerage of England
Preceded by Albert Edward Delaval Astley	Baron Hastings; 1956–2007	Succeeded by Delaval Thomas Harold Astley
