= John R. Terry =

British mathematician

John R. Terry FMedSci is a British mathematician, currently Professor of Digital Health Innovation and EPSRC Established Career Fellow at the University of Plymouth, and previously Director of the Centre for Systems Modelling and Quantitative Biomedicine at the University of Birmingham. He was previously Director of the EPSRC Centre for Predictive Modelling in Healthcare, a £2M initiative funded by the EPSRC. He is well known for the development and application of mathematical techniques in biology and medicine, notably epilepsy and neuroendocrinology. He is a member of the ILAE task force on Network Diseases, as well as previously being a member of the Scientific Advisory Committee of Epilepsy Research UK (2018-2023). He currently serves as Theme Lead for Enabling Technologies of the newly established Epilepsy Research Institute. According to Gateway to Research he has received approaching £18M in UKRI research funding, a substantial amount for a mathematician. His research has been recognized internationally, most recently by the University of Melbourne through a Miegunyah Fellowship.

== Career ==
Terry was an undergraduate at the University of Reading before taking a PhD at the University of Surrey. He has held academic positions at Loughborough University, the University of Bristol, the University of Sheffield and the University of Exeter, before joining the University of Birmingham in 2019. During his time at the University of Exeter he established the Centre for Biomedical Modelling and Analysis, of which he was co-director, supported by the Wellcome Trust.

In 2018 Terry with Dr Wessel Woldman co-founded Neuronostics, a company focussed on epilepsy diagnosis and management. In 2020 Neuronostics was named national start-up of the year by Medilink UK. In 2021 Neuronostics was one of the final four in the Nature SpinOff Prize. In 2022 Neuronostics was named a winner in the Science StartUp category of the Falling Walls Foundation. In 2024 Neuronostics achieved further international success winning $125,000 in the Epilepsy Foundation Sharktank, whilst Terry himself was recognised for his work with Neuronostics, being awarded Founder of the Year by TechSpark.

Terry was elected to the fellowship of the Academy of Medical Sciences in May 2025, cited for his contributions to epilepsy, endocrinology, public understanding of science, and commercial endeavours.

== Scientific contributions ==
As a graduate student, Terry focused on synchronization problems in solid state laser systems, before moving into neuroscience during his postdoctoral career. He is most well known for his work in describing the mechanisms of seizures and susceptibility to epilepsy, utilising mathematical models for the first time in the context of diagnosis and surgery. He is also highly cited in the field of neuroendocrinology, where along with Stafford Lightman he has described the pituitary-adrenal interplay responsible for hourly rhythms in the stress responsive hormone cortisol.
