= Baron Hastings =

Title in the Peerage of England

Baronies of Hastings First creation (1290) Third creation (1461)(abeyant)
- Arms of Hastings (used as quartering by later barons), Barons Hastings: Or, a maunch gules (Note: from the Collins Roll, also appears in the Dering Roll, A217; The Caerlaverock Poem, K83; St George's Roll, E119 & The Galloway Roll, GA223)
- Creation date: 1290 (first creation)(dormant 1389-1841, abeyant 1542-1841); 1299 (second creation); 1461 (third creation) (abeyant 1868-71, 1960-)
- Created by: Edward I (first creation); Edward I (second creation); Edward IV (third creation)
- Peerage: Peerage of England
- First holder: John Hastings, 1st Baron Hastings
- Present holder: Delaval Astley, 23rd Baron Hastings (first creation)
- Subsidiary titles: First creation: Baronet Astley of Hill Morton
- Extinction date: 1314 (second creation)
- Former seats: First creation: Melton Constable Hall; Seaton Delaval Hall; Third creation: Loudoun Castle

Baron Hastings is a title that has been created three times. The first creation was in the Peerage of England in 1290, and is extant. The second creation was in the Peerage of England in 1299, and became extinct on the death of the first holder in c. 1314. The third creation was in the Peerage of England in 1461, and has been in abeyance since 1960.

== 1290 creation ==
John Hastings was summoned to Parliament as Lord Hastings in 1290. (Note: “He ... is recorded to have been present in pleno parliamento domini Regis on the morrow of Trinity 18 Edw. I [29 May 1290] with other magnates et proceres tunc in parliamento existentes, whereby he is held to have become LORD HASTINGES....In the Hastings Peerage claim in 1840-41 the Committee for Privileges of the House of Lords, following the recommendation of Lord Chancellor Cottenham, decided that the presence of Sir John de Hastings in this Parliament was pursuant to the issue of a writ of summons to him, and resolved accordingly.” - The Complete Peerage, 2nd edition, Volume VI, P 347) He was the son of Henry de Hastings, who had been created Baron Hastings by Simon de Montfort in 1263. Since the first Baron's title does not appear to have been recognised by the King, although his son John Hastings is sometimes referred to as the second Baron Hastings, the majority of historians enumerate John as 1st Baron Hastings. John Hastings's grandson, the third Baron Hastings, was created Laurence Hastings, 1st Earl of Pembroke in 1339. The latter's son, the second Earl of Pembroke, married as his second wife Anne Hastings, 2nd Baroness Manny. Their son, the third Earl and fifth Baron Hastings, succeeded his mother as third Baron Manny.

On his death in 1389 the earldom and barony of Manny became extinct, while the barony of Hastings became dormant. It then became the subject of a bitter-fought lawsuit, nominally over the right to the Hastings arms but including the right to the family honours. The barony was claimed by Hugh Hastings (1377–1396) (later deemed the de jure 7th Baron Hastings; see below). He was the eldest son of Sir Hugh Hastings, grandson of Sir Hugh Hastings (c. 1307–1347), son of the second Baron by his second wife. Hugh claimed the title as "heir of the half blood". However, the claim was contested by Reginald Grey, 3rd Baron Grey de Ruthyn, as "heir of the whole blood". Lord Grey de Ruthyn claimed the Barony in right of his grandmother Elizabeth, daughter of the second Baron Hastings by his first wife. On the early death of Hugh Hastings in 1396 the claim passed to his younger brother Edward Hastings (1382–1438) (later deemed the de jure 8th Baron Hastings; see below). In 1410 a court decided in favour of Grey. Hastings immediately appealed, and at the coronation of Henry V in 1413, he claimed the right to carry the spurs before the King, which Lord Grey de Ruthyn had done undisputed in 1399 at the coronation of Henry IV. Hastings was later ordered to pay the costs of the trial. When he refused, he was imprisoned in 1417. He remained imprisoned until 1433, but refused to buy his release by abandoning his claims. No final decision regarding the Barony was made at the time, but both families continued to claim the title. The Greys finally abandoned their claim in 1639.

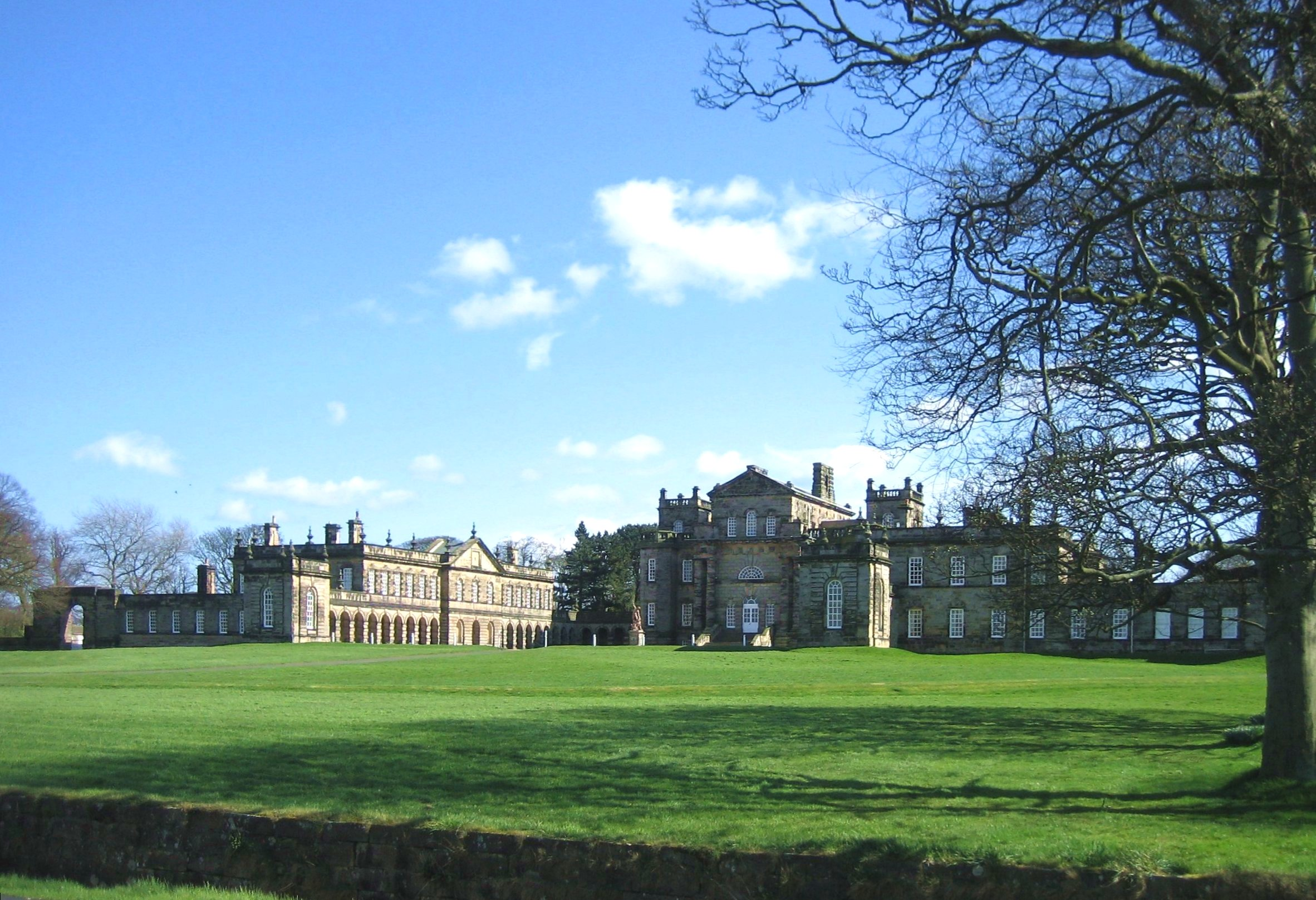
Seaton Delaval Hall, the former seat of the Astley and Delaval families, who intermarried

After the title had been dormant for 452 years, in 1841 the House of Lords decided that the rightful successor to the third Earl of Pembroke and fifth Baron Hastings was his kinsman John Hastings, de jure 6th Baron Hastings. He was the eldest son of Sir Hugh Hastings, younger son of the first Baron. His successor should have been his great-nephew, the aforementioned Hugh Hastings, de jure 7th Baron Hastings. The next holder should have been his younger brother, the aforementioned Edward Hastings, de jure 8th Baron Hastings. On the death of the latter's great-great-great-grandson, the de jure 15th Baron, the peerage technically fell into abeyance between the Baron's sisters Anne and Elizabeth. The House of Lords decision meant that there were three co-heirs to the barony. The decision was in favour of Sir Jacob Astley, 6th Baronet, who was summoned to the House of Lords the same year as Lord Hastings. He was a descendant of the aforementioned Elizabeth, sister of the de jure 15th Baron. Lord Hastings had previously represented West Norfolk in the House of Commons.

As of 2010 the titles are held by his great-great-great-grandson, the twenty-third Baron and thirteenth Baronet, who succeeded his father in 2007. The twenty-second Baron served in the Conservative administrations of Harold Macmillan and Sir Alec Douglas-Home as a government whip from 1961 to 1962 and as Parliamentary Secretary to the Minister of Housing and Local Government from 1962 to 1964.

The Astley Baronetcy, of Hillmorton in the County of Warwick, had been created in the Baronetage of England on 25 June 1660 for Jacob Astley. He represented Norfolk in House of Commons for many years. His great-grandson, Edward Astley, also represented Norfolk in Parliament. He married Rhoda Delaval, daughter of Francis Blake Delaval, of Seaton Delaval Hall in Northumberland, and sister of John Delaval, 1st Baron Delaval. Through this marriage the Seaton Delaval estate came into the Astley family when Rhoda's brother did not produce a male heir. Their son, Sir Jacob Henry Astley, was also Member of Parliament for Norfolk. The latter was the father of the sixth Baronet, who succeeded as Baron Hastings in 1841.

The family seat was Seaton Delaval Hall, now in the possession of the National Trust.

== 1299 creation ==
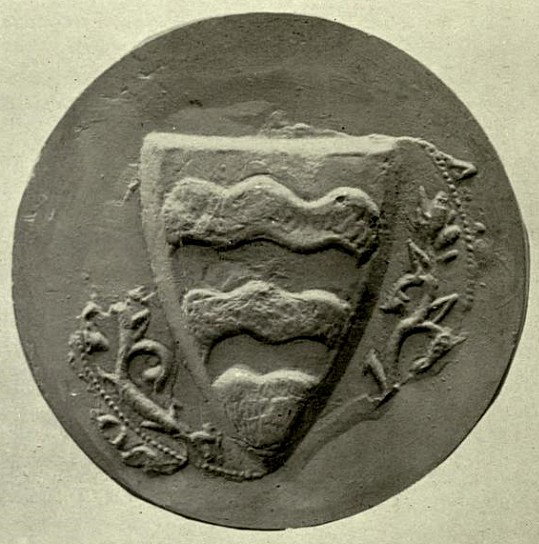
Seal of Edmund Hastings, 1st Baron Hastings, affixed to the Barons' Letter of 1301, which his brother also sealed. He displays the arms of Muireadhach I, Earl of Menteith (d. 1213) (Note: The Earl ruling at the start of the age of heraldry (c.1200-1215))Barry wavy of six or and gules

Edmund Hastings of Inchmahome (anciently Inchmacholmok) in Perthshire, Scotland, was the younger son of Henry de Hastings (c. 1235–c. 1268) of Ashill, Norfolk, (who was summoned to Parliament by Simon de Montfort, 6th Earl of Leicester as Lord Hastings in 1263, but the title was not recognized by King Henry III). He was thus the younger brother of John Hastings, 1st Baron Hastings (title created 1290). On 29 December 1299 Edmund Hastings was summoned to Parliament as Lord Hastings. The title became extinct on his death without issue at the Battle of Bannockburn in 1314. His wife (given to him in marriage by King Edward I) was Isabel, suo jure Countess of Menteith, a Scottish title, and on his seal appended to the Barons' Letter of 1301 he displayed the arms of the early Earls of Menteith: Barry wavy of six or and gules. (Note: See imageFile:Edmund de Hastings.jpg)

== 1461 creation ==
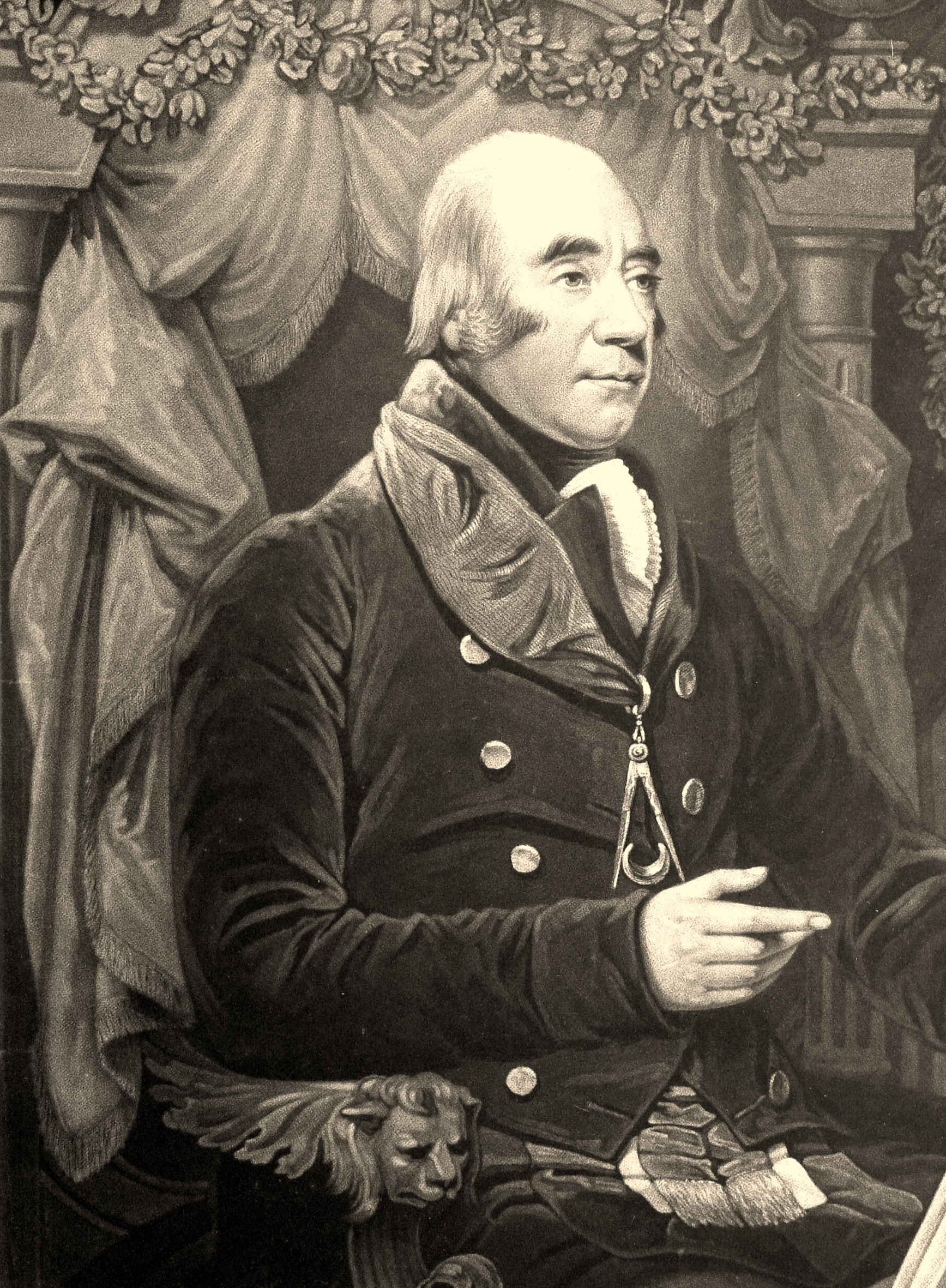
Francis Rawdon-Hastings, 1st Marquess of Hastings

Sir William Hastings (c. 1430–1483) served as Lord Chamberlain and as Ambassador to France. He was summoned to Parliament as Lord Hastings on 26 July 1461. He was a great friend and confidant of King Edward IV and one of the wealthiest and most powerful men of his time. Lord Hastings was summarily beheaded on Tower Hill in 1483 following an accusation of treason by Richard of Gloucester during the events that led to the latter's coronation. However, as he was not attainted for treason the title was passed to his son, Edward, the second Baron, who married Mary, granddaughter of Robert Hungerford, 3rd Baron Hungerford, who had been attainted in 1461. Mary managed to obtain a reversal of the attainders of the Barony of Hungerford, Barony of Botreaux and Barony of De Moleyns. Their son, George, inherited the Barony of Hastings from his father and the Baronies of Hungerford, Botreaux and De Moleyns from his mother; in 1513, he was created Earl of Huntingdon.

Cokayne in The Complete Peerage distinguishes two baronies by writ — Baron Hastings de Hastings and Baron Hastings de Hungerford — based on the respective titles used in the writs of summons for the 1st and 2nd barons to the 1461 and 1482 Parliaments. In this scheme, the nth Baron Hastings is actually nth Baron Hastings de Hastings and (n–1)th Baron Hastings de Hungerford.

On the death of the tenth Earl in 1789 the earldom became dormant, while the baronies of Hastings, Hungerford, Botreaux and De Moleyns passed on to his sister Elizabeth, the wife of John Rawdon, 1st Earl of Moira. Their son, the second Earl of Moira, inherited the four baronies on his mother's death in 1808. In 1816 he was created Marquess of Hastings. Lord Hastings married Flora Mure-Campbell, 6th Countess of Loudoun. Their son, the second Marquess, also inherited the Earldom of Loudoun from his mother. He married Barbara, 20th Baroness Grey de Ruthyn. On the death in 1868 of their younger son, the fourth Marquess (who had also succeeded his mother as Baron Grey de Ruthyn), the marquessate became extinct, the Scottish earldom of Loudoun passed on to his eldest sister, while the Baronies of Hastings, Hungerford, Botreaux, De Moleyns and Grey de Ruthyn fell into abeyance between the sisters.

In 1871 the Baronies of Botreaux, Hungerford, Moleyns and Hastings were called out of abeyance in favour of Edith, Countess of Loudoun (but not the Barony of Grey de Ruthyn, which was called out of abeyance in 1885 in favour of a different heir). Cokayne regards the 1871 change as applying to Baron Hastings de Hastings, leaving Baron Hastings de Hungerford still in abeyance. On the death of the Countess of Loudoun's son, the 11th Earl, in 1920, the earldom passed to his eldest niece, Elizabeth, while the four Baronies fell into abeyance between Elizabeth and her younger sisters.

In 1921 the Baronies of Hastings and Botreaux were called out of abeyance in favour of Elizabeth (and the Barony of Stanley was called out of abeyance in her favour at the same time). However, the barony of De Moleyns and the barony of Hungerford were called out of abeyance in favour of a different heir (see the Viscount St Davids). On Elizabeth's death in 1960 the baronies of Hastings, Stanley and Botreaux fell into abeyance between her daughters. As of 2021, they remain in abeyance.

== "Baron Hastings" (1263) ==
- Henry de Hastings, "1st Baron Hastings" (died 1268), supposed title created by Simon de Montfort, not recognised by King Henry III.

== Barons Hastings (1290) ==
- John Hastings, 1st Baron Hastings, Lord of the Manor of Hunningham (1262–1313)
- John Hastings, 2nd Baron Hastings, Lord of the Manor of Hunningham (1287–1325)
- Lawrence Hastings, 1st Earl of Pembroke, 3rd Baron Hastings (1318–1348)
- John Hastings, 2nd Earl of Pembroke, 4th Baron Hastings (1347–1375)
- John Hastings, 3rd Earl of Pembroke, 5th Baron Hastings (1372–1389) (dormant)
- John Hastings, de jure 6th Baron Hastings (1326–1393), heir by the half blood through his great grandfather
- Hugh Hastings, de jure 7th Baron Hastings (1377–1396), grandson of the 6th Baron
- Edward Hastings, de jure 8th Baron Hastings (1382–1438), brother of the 7th Baron
- John Hastings, de jure 9th Baron Hastings (1411–1477)
- Hugh Hastings, de jure 10th Baron Hastings (1447–1488)
- John Hastings, de jure 11th Baron Hastings (1466–1504)
- George Hastings, de jure 12th Baron Hastings (1474–1512), brother of the 11th baron
- John Hastings, de jure 13th Baron Hastings (1498–1514)
- Hugh Hastings, de jure 14th Baron Hastings (1515–1540), brother of the 13th baron
- John Hastings, de jure 15th Baron Hastings (1531–1542) (abeyant 1542)
- Jacob Astley, 16th Baron Hastings, 6th Baronet Astley (1797–1859) (abeyance terminated 1841; confirmed in barony 1841)
- Jacob Henry Delaval Astley, 17th Baron Hastings, 7th Baronet Astley (1822–1871)
- Delaval Loftus Astley, 18th Baron Hastings, 8th Baronet Astley (1825–1872)
- Bernard Edward Delaval Astley, 19th Baron Hastings, 9th Baronet Astley (1855–1875)
- George Manners Astley, 20th Baron Hastings, 10th Baronet Astley (1857–1904)
- Albert Edward Delaval Astley, 21st Baron Hastings, 11th Baronet Astley (1882–1956)
- Edward Delaval Henry Astley, 22nd Baron Hastings, 12th Baronet Astley (1912–2007)
- Delaval Thomas Harold Astley, 23rd Baron Hastings (b. 1960)

The heir apparent is the present holder's son Hon. Jacob Addison Astley (b. 1991)

== Astley baronets, of Hill Morton (1660) ==
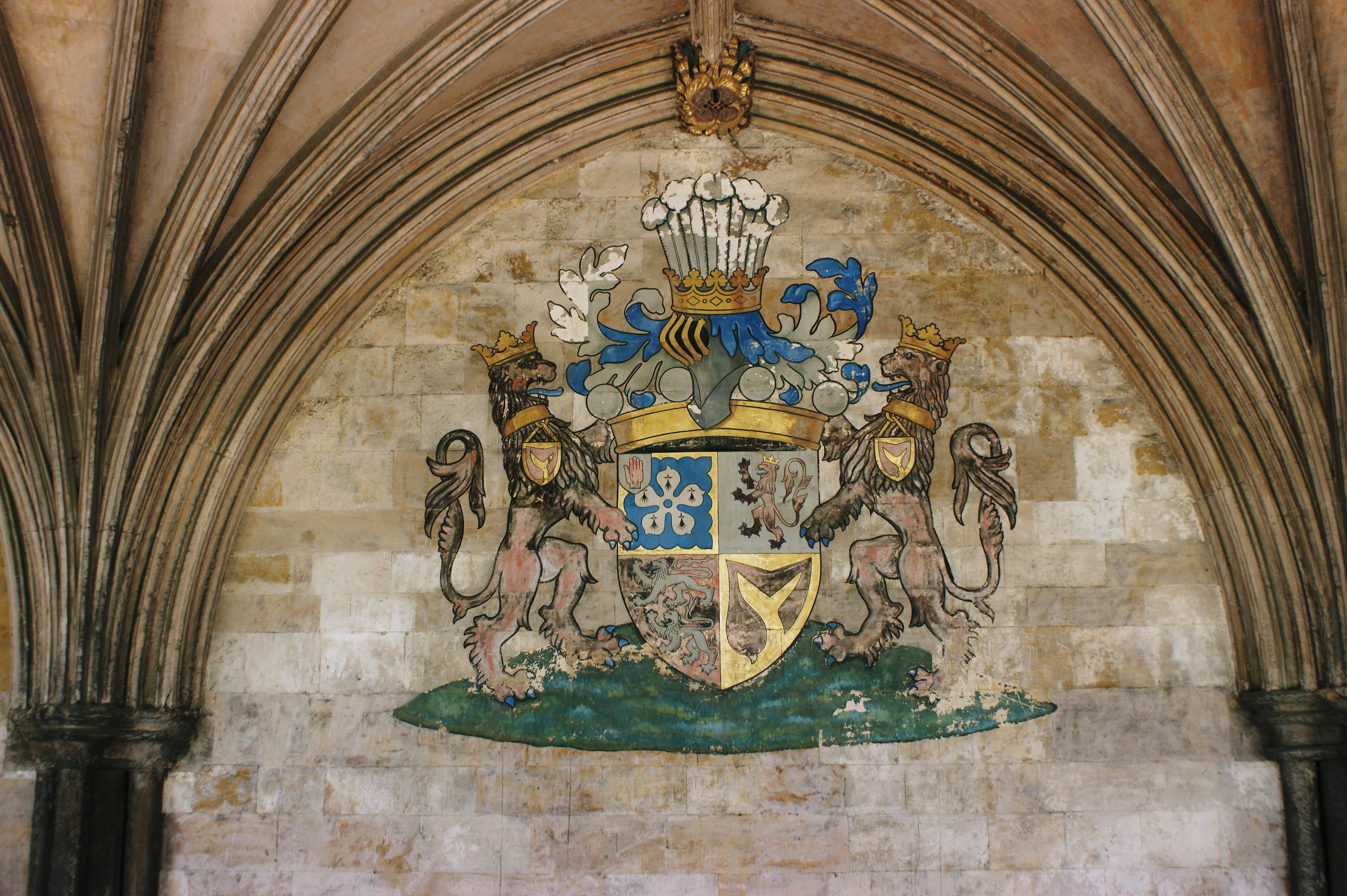
Arms of one of the Astley baronets in Norwich Cathedral, Norfolk. Arms of Hastings in 4th quarter and on escutcheons on supporters. The 6th Baronet succeeded as Baron Hastings in 1841

- Sir Jacob Astley, 1st Baronet (c. 1639–1729)
- Sir Philip Astley, 2nd Baronet (1667–1739)
- Sir Jacob Astley, 3rd Baronet (1692–1760)
- Sir Edward Astley, 4th Baronet (1729–1802)
- Sir Jacob Henry Astley, 5th Baronet (1756–1817)
- Sir Jacob Astley, 6th Baronet (1797–1859) (succeeded as Baron Hastings in 1841)

== Baron Hastings (1299) ==
- Edmund Hastings, 1st Baron Hastings (c. 1265–c. 1314)

== Baron Hastings (1461) ==
- William Hastings, 1st Baron Hastings (c. 1430–1483)
- Edward Hastings, 2nd Baron Hastings (c. 1464–1506)

Created Earl of Huntingdon and the Barony of Botreaux is merged.

- George Hastings, 1st Earl of Huntingdon, 6th Baron Botreaux, 5th Baron Hungerford, 3rd Baron de Moleyns, 3rd Baron Hastings (1488–1544)
- (The baronies of Botreaux, Hungerford, de Moleyns and Hastings then descended together until the death of Charles Rawdon-Hastings, 11th Earl of Loudoun in 1920)
- Francis Hastings, 2nd Earl of Huntingdon, 4th Baron Hastings, 7th Baron of Botreaux (1514–1560)
- Henry Hastings, 3rd Earl of Huntingdon, 5th Baron Hastings, 8th Baron of Botreaux (1536–1595)
- George Hastings, 4th Earl of Huntingdon, 6th Baron Hastings, 9th Baron of Botreaux (1540–1604)
- Henry Hastings, 5th Earl of Huntingdon, 7th Baron Hastings, 10th Baron of Botreaux (1586–1643)
- Ferdinando Hastings, 6th Earl of Huntingdon, 8th Baron Hastings, 11th Baron of Botreaux (1609–1656)
- Theophilus Hastings, 7th Earl of Huntingdon, 9th Baron Hastings, 12th Baron of Botreaux (1650–1701)
- George Hastings, 8th Earl of Huntingdon, 10th Baron Hastings, 13th Baron of Botreaux (1677–1705)
- Theophilus Hastings, 9th Earl of Huntingdon, 11th Baron Hastings, 14th Baron of Botreaux (1696–1746)
- Francis Hastings, 10th Earl of Huntingdon, 12th Baron Hastings, 15th Baron of Botreaux (1729–1789)

Earldom of Huntingdon moves to another family branch.

- Elizabeth Rawdon, 13th Baroness Hastings, 16th Baron of Botreaux (1731–1808)

Created Marquess of Hastings

- Francis Rawdon-Hastings, 1st Marquess of Hastings, 14th Baron Hastings, 17th Baron of Botreaux (1754–1826)
- George Augustus Francis Rawdon-Hastings, 2nd Marquess of Hastings, 15th Baron Hastings, 18th Baron of Botreaux (1808–1844)
- Paulyn Reginald Serlo Rawdon-Hastings, 3rd Marquess of Hastings, 16th Baron Hastings, 19th Baron of Botreaux (1832–1851)
- Henry Weysford Charles Plantagenet Rawdon-Hastings, 4th Marquess of Hastings, 17th Baron Hastings, 20th Baron of Botreaux (1842–1868) (abeyant)

Marquessate became extinct, Earldom of Loudoun is merged

- Edith Rawdon-Hastings, 10th Countess of Loudoun, 18th Baroness Hastings, 21st Baron of Botreaux (1833–1874) (abeyance terminated 1871)
- Charles Edward Rawdon-Hastings, 11th Earl of Loudoun, 22nd Baron Botreaux, 21st Baron Hungerford, 19th Baron de Moleyns, 19th Baron Hastings (1855–1920) (abeyant)

Barony of Stanley is merged

- Edith Abney-Hastings, 12th Countess of Loudoun, 23rd Baroness Botreaux, 20th Baroness Hastings, 7th Baroness Stanley (1883–1960) (abeyance terminated 1921; abeyant on her death)

The co-heirs are the descendants of the 20th Baroness:

- Simon Abney-Hastings, 15th Earl of Loudoun (born 1974)
- Mrs Sheena Williams (born 1941)
- Mrs Flora Purdie (born 1957)
- Norman Angus MacLaren (born 1948)

== See also ==
- Edward Hastings, 1st Baron Hastings of Loughborough (c. 1506–1572)
- Henry Hastings, 1st Baron Loughborough (1610–1667)
- Earl of Pembroke (1339 creation)
- Baron Manny
- Astley baronets
- Earl of Huntingdon (1513 creation)
- Marquess of Hastings
- Earl of Loudoun
- Baron Hungerford
- Baron Botreaux
- Baron de Moleyns
- Baron Stanley
- Viscount St Davids
- Baron Grey de Ruthyn
- Baron Delaval
