= Albert Astley, 21st Baron Hastings =

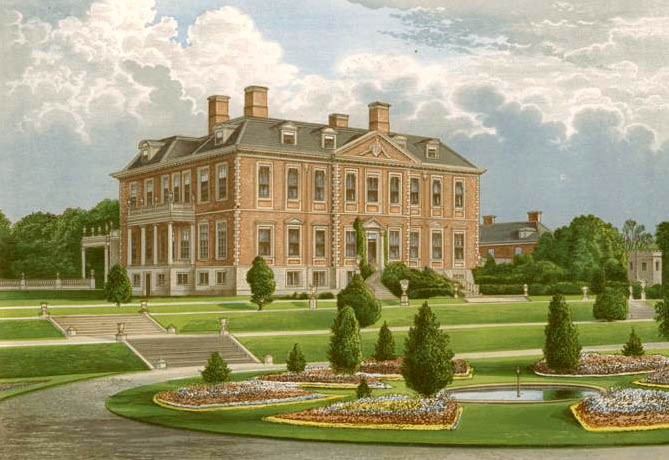
Melton Constable Hall

Albert Edward Delaval Astley, 21st Baron Hastings (24 November 1882 – 18 January 1956) was an English landowner and peer, a member of the House of Lords from 1904 until his death.

The son of George Manners Astley, 20th Baron Hastings (1857 – 1904) and his wife Elizabeth Harbord, a daughter of Charles Harbord, 5th Baron Suffield, he was a god-son of Edward VII. He was educated at Eton College and the Royal Military College, Sandhurst, then in 1902 saw active service in the final months of the Second Boer War.

In September 1904, while on his way home from South Africa by the steamship Norman, he succeeded to his father's peerage and the Melton Constable Hall and Seaton Delaval Hall estates, arriving in Norfolk some days after the funeral.

The new peer took up his seat in the House of Lords. He was aide-de-camp to the Viceroy of Ireland, Lord Aberdeen, from 1905 to 1906.

In 1907, Hastings married Lady Marguerite Nevill, a daughter of William Nevill, 1st Marquess of Abergavenny. They had one son, born in 1912, and three daughters.

Hastings was a member of Norfolk County Council from 1909 to 1919.

In the First World War, Hastings returned to the army and served in the 7th Queen's Own Hussars. He was twice mentioned in despatches and was promoted to Lieutenant-Colonel.

He was President of the North Norfolk Conservative Association from 1937 until his death.

In 1948, after it had been in his family for more than 700 years, Hastings sold the Melton Constable estate to Hugh Grosvenor, 2nd Duke of Westminster. He died in 1956 and was succeeded by his only son, Edward Astley.

== Notes ==
Peerage of England
Preceded by George Manners Astley	Baron Hastings; 1904–1956	Succeeded by Edward Astley
