= Melton Constable Hall =

Country house in Norfolk, England

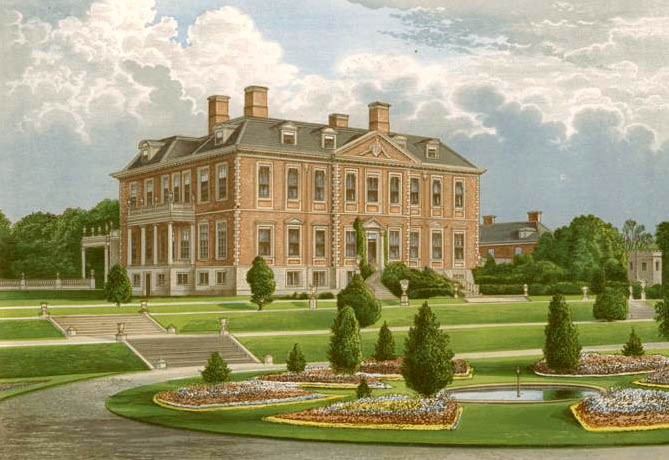
Melton Constable Hall circa 1880. 52°50'47.20"N 1° 0'49.59"E

Melton Constable Hall is a large (Grade I listed) country house in the parish of Melton Constable, Norfolk, England designed in the Christopher Wren style and built between 1664 and 1670 for the Astley family who owned the estate from 1235 until 1948. The core of the house is Elizabethan.

== Hall ==
Melton Constable Hall is regarded as the finest specimen of the Christopher Wren style of house. The house was re-modelled and extended by Sir Jacob Astley between 1664 and 1670, replacing an earlier house dating from c.1500. It has some fine plaster ceilings dated 1687, probably fashioned by Edward Goudge.

The house is constructed of brick with slate and copper roofs. The main range has a nine bay frontage, with 7-bay extensions to the east and north. The main range is Grade I listed and the north wing Grade II* listed. The stable buildings are variously Grade II and Grade II* listed.

== Park ==
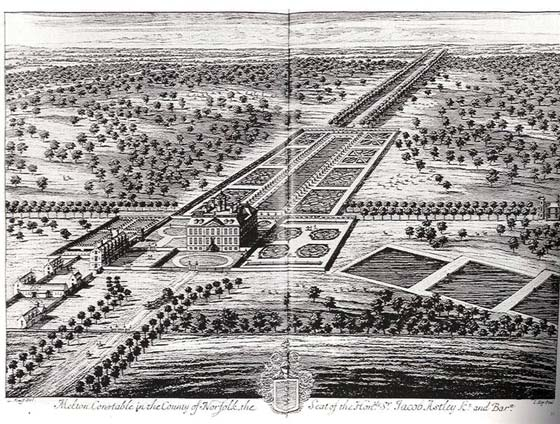
Melton Constable Hall and park shown in Kip and Knyff's Britannia Illustrata (1707).

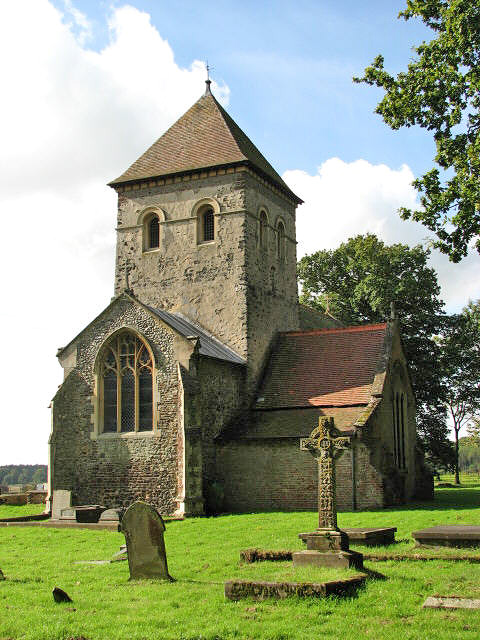
St Peter's Church

Melton Constable Park was designed by Capability Brown in 1764–69; it has a church, a temple and various artistic follies. The church, St Peter's, which is small and unusual, nestles under trees (yews, firs and oaks) and can be reached by a drive lined with rhododendrons. It contains Norman work and many memorials to the Astley family who bear the title Lord Hastings. Sir Jacob Astley fought in the English Civil War and his prayer is still quoted by many: "Lord, I shall be very busy this day. I may forget Thee but do Thou not forget me".

North of the church and the hall there stands a tower known as Belle Vue, which has a view of Norwich and the sea. Belle Vue is in fact in Briningham, some 2 miles (3.2 km) from the Hall and not between the Hall and the church in Melton Park, although it could just be described as between the Hall and St Edmund's Church in Swanton Novers. It was originally a smock-mill that was built by Sir Jacob Astley, 1st Baronet, of Melton Constable Hall in 1721. The mill was not much used. Sir Edward Astley, the 4th Baronet, replaced the wooden tower with a brick one c. 1775. The new tower was built over the existing three-storey brick, octagonal base; it is the only one of its type in the county and is the oldest base in the county. It fell into dereliction and remains on the Heritage at Risk Register, as do a number of outbuildings on the estate. Belle Vue tower is now a private home.

== History ==
The manor of Melton Constable was given by William I to the Bishop of Thetford and occupied by his Constable, who had assumed the name of Melton with the suffix of Constable. It then passed to the Astley family and descended in the male line of that family from 1235 until sold by Albert Astley, 21st Baron Hastings, in 1948 to the 2nd Duke of Westminster. It was then sold again in the 1950s, with the land continuing to be used for agriculture, but with the house being allowed to deteriorate. In 1985, under the threat of a compulsory purchase order, the owner was obliged to sell the Hall and parts of the estate.

The village of Seaton Sluice in Northumberland has public houses called the Astley Arms and the Melton Constable, a legacy of a marriage in Georgian times which united the Astley family with the Delaval family of the nearby Seaton Delaval Hall.

The award-winning film The Go Between was filmed at Melton Constable Hall.

The 1985 Al Pacino film Revolution also used Melton Constable Hall as one of its locations.

== 21st century ==
In 2006, an article in the Norwich newspaper, the Eastern Daily Press, raised concerns about the condition of the main house and gave some information about the business dealings of the then-owner.

In the years that followed some local people became concerned about the state of the hall and its surrounding buildings. Parts of it were reported to be very run-down. The following buildings were listed as At Risk, as of April 2010 – Melton Constable Hall, the west and north wings of its stable court, its Terraces, and the Bath House and Teahouse in Melton Constable Park.

As of 2017, the property was owned by Roger Gawn, who faced an unsuccessful prosecution when he removed some trees and shrubs.
