= Delaval Astley, 23rd Baron Hastings =

English peer, actor and farmer

The Right Honourable The Lord Hastings
- Born: Delaval Thomas Harold Astley; 25 April 1960 (age 66)
- Spouse: Veronica M. Smart
- Children: 3
- Parent: Edward Astley, 22nd Baron Hastings

Delaval Thomas Harold Astley, 23rd Baron Hastings (born 25 April 1960), is an English peer, actor, and farmer.

== Family ==
Delaval Astley was born on 25 April 1960 to Edward Delaval Henry Astley, the 22nd Baron Hastings, and Catherine "Nicki" Hinton, Lady Astley. He was educated at Radley College followed by Hatfield College, Durham. At Durham he was active in student theatre and won the award for best individual performance at the One Act Play Festival during the 1978–1979 academic year.

Delaval's father Edward was a prominent member of the British government under the Conservative administrations of the 1960s and a noted philanthropist and patron of the arts. Delaval Astley inherited the ancient baronial title upon the death of his father in April 2007, becoming the 23rd Baron Hastings and 13th Baronet Astley. The most recent Astley family seat was at Seaton Delaval Hall in Northumberland, prior to its being sold to the National Trust in December 2009. Lord Hastings is married to Veronica M. Smart, now Lady Hastings, and the couple have one son and two daughters.

== Career ==
For some years he played the character of Cameron Fraser in the long-running British radio drama The Archers.

Lord Hastings now resides near Letheringsett in Norfolk, where he is currently a farmer and businessman. He took over management of the 2023-hectare Astley estate in 1998.

He has been involved in a variety of local projects, such as the Holt Festival. In 2014, Lord Hastings donated to the Festival and was named a Platinum Ambassador for his contributions.

He was chosen to carry one of the gold spurs of the royal regalia, emblems of knighthood and chivalry that were presented to King Charles III during his coronation.

Peerage of England
| Preceded by Edward Astley | Baron Hastings; 2007–present | Incumbent |
