= Epilepsy Research Institute =

British medical research charity

- Formation: 2008
- Registration no.: 1100394
- Legal status: Charity
- Headquarters: London
- Fields: Epilepsy
- Website: epilepsy-institute.org.uk

Epilepsy Research Institute, formerly Epilepsy Research UK, is a British medical research charity dedicated to funding and supporting research into epilepsy.

In March 2007, the Epilepsy Research Foundation merged with the Fund for Epilepsy to become Epilepsy Research UK (ERUK). ERUK is the only national organisation exclusively engaged in research into epilepsy.

The research projects and fellowships the organisation supports are reported to be of the highest scientific merit as they are subject to rigorous scrutiny, involving a Scientific Advisory Committee, independent expert opinion, interviews and peer review. The clinical research portfolio discovers ways to advance the medical care and management of people living with epilepsy and the lab-based scientific projects investigate causes and methods for improved diagnosis, treatment and prevention.

The organisation also plays a key role in capacity building the research community. The Expert Workshop programme is internationally renowned and the dissemination activities aim to forge local and global collaborations.

The charity is a member of the Association of Medical Research Charities, known to be a hallmark of quality research.
