= Seaton Delaval Hall =

Grade I listed building in Northumberland, United Kingdom

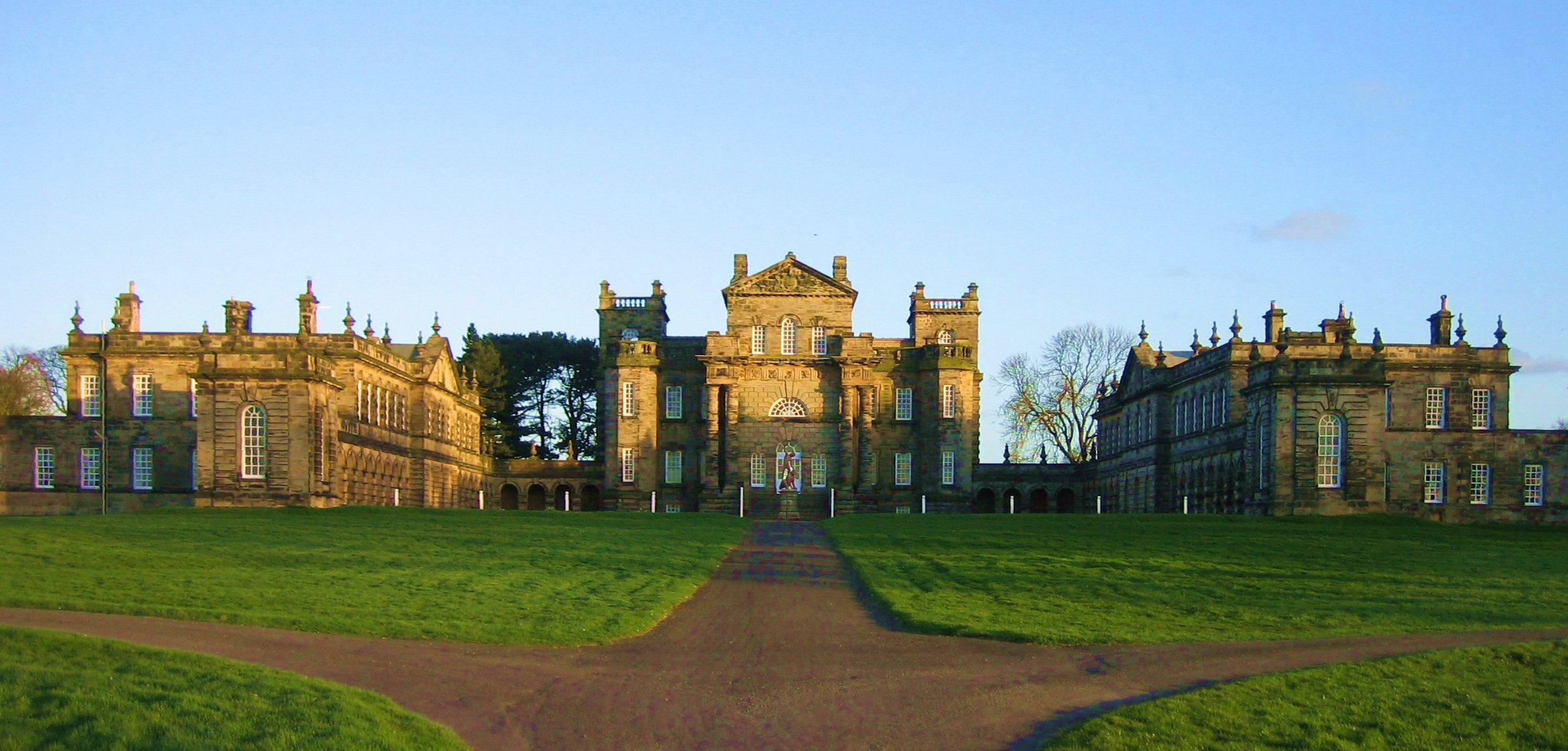
- View from the north

- Location within Northumberland

General information
- Location: Seaton Delaval, Northumberland, Newcastle upon Tyne, England
- Coordinates: 55.0822°N 1.4965°W
- Current tenants: National Trust
- Construction started: 1718
- Completed: 1728

Design and construction
- Architects: Sir John Vanbrugh (for Admiral George Delaval)

Seaton Delaval Hall is a Grade I listed country house in Northumberland, England, near the coast just north of Newcastle upon Tyne. Located between Seaton Sluice and Seaton Delaval, it was designed by Sir John Vanbrugh in 1718 for Admiral George Delaval; it is now owned by the National Trust.

Since completion of the house in 1728, it has had an unfortunate history. Neither architect nor patron lived to see its completion; it then passed through a succession of heirs, being lived in only intermittently. Most damaging of all, in 1822 the central block was gutted by fire, and has remained an empty shell ever since.

The 18th-century gardens of the hall are Grade II* listed on the Register of Historic Parks and Gardens.

== History ==
=== Early history ===
The Delaval family had owned the estate since the time of the Norman Conquest. Admiral George Delaval bought the estate from an impoverished kinsman, Sir John Delaval, in 1717. George Delaval had made his fortune from capturing prize ships while in the Navy, and had also served as a British envoy during the reign of Queen Anne. In 1718, he called on architect Sir John Vanbrugh to advise him on how to modernise and enhance the existing mansion. Upon viewing the site, Vanbrugh felt he could do nothing, and advised complete demolition of all except the ancient chapel near to the mansion, which is now the parish church of Our Lady. James Mewburn (c.1680-1731) of Lookout Farm House, Seaton Sluice, was the steward and clerk of works in charge during this time.

Vanbrugh's advice was taken and the construction work was completed in 1728, five years after the death of the Admiral. The resulting new mansion was the last country house Vanbrugh designed, and it is regarded as one of his finest works. On completion, the Admiral's nephew Francis Blake Delaval (the elder) inherited the property, and moved in immediately.

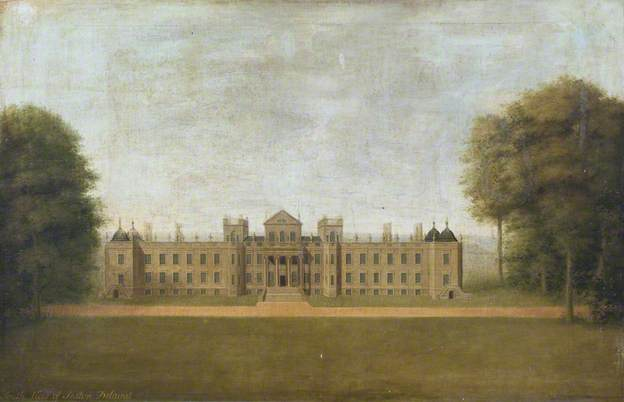
Unsigned painting of the south front of Seaton Delaval Hall, probably by William Bell. The southwest wing at left may never have been built; the southeast wing at right was destroyed by fire in 1822.

In 1775, the Newcastle portrait artist William Bell made two paintings of the Hall, depicting the north and south fronts with some artistic licence, including wings that were never actually constructed. Bell also painted portraits of many of the residents of the house at the time, earning him the patronage of Lord Delaval, a younger son of the above-mentioned Francis Blake Delaval (he was created Baron Delaval in the Peerage of Ireland in 1783 and Baron Delaval in the Peerage of Great Britain in 1786).

In 1822, the central block was gutted by a fire said to have been caused by jackdaws nesting in the chimneys of the section of the south-east wing closest to the main house. The house was partially restored by the architect John Dobson between 1862 and 1863, when the central block was re-roofed, although it remained a shell internally.

During the Second World War the hall was used to house German prisoners-of-war.

=== More modern times ===
The hall was opened to the public for the first time in 1950. Further restoration was completed in 1959 and the early 1960s, From 1968 to 1984 "medieval banquets" were held in the original kitchen of the hall. However, the house was to remain unoccupied until the 1980s when, after a period of 160 years, Edward Delaval Henry Astley, 22nd Baron Hastings moved into the west wing.

Subsequently, Delaval Astley, 23rd Baron Hastings, wishing to preserve the future of the hall and encourage greater public access, began discussions with the National Trust. On 1 September 2008 the National Trust launched an appeal for £6.3m to bring the hall, with its gardens and grounds, into the Trust's custody. The hall opened to visitors again after the National Trust announced, in December 2009, that its appeal had been successful.

The hall was closed to visitors in 2018 as part of a £3.7 million refurbishment project funded by the Heritage Lottery Fund. In October 2021, the hall was one of 142 sites across England to receive part of a £35-million injection into the government's Culture Recovery Fund, specifically for its sea-walk walls and corbels.

== Architecture and layout ==
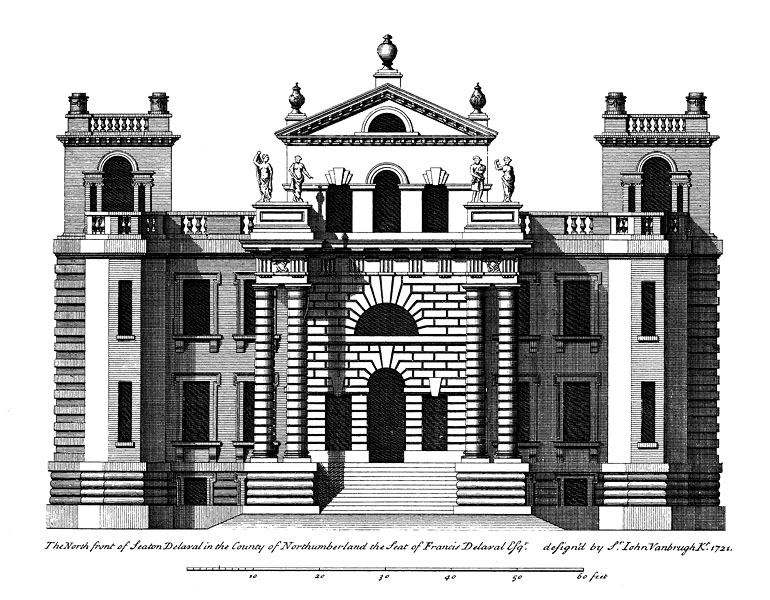
Central block drawn before completion, as Vanbrugh envisaged the house. The statues on the pediments were never executed. Engraving by Colen Campbell, from his Vitruvius Britannicus.

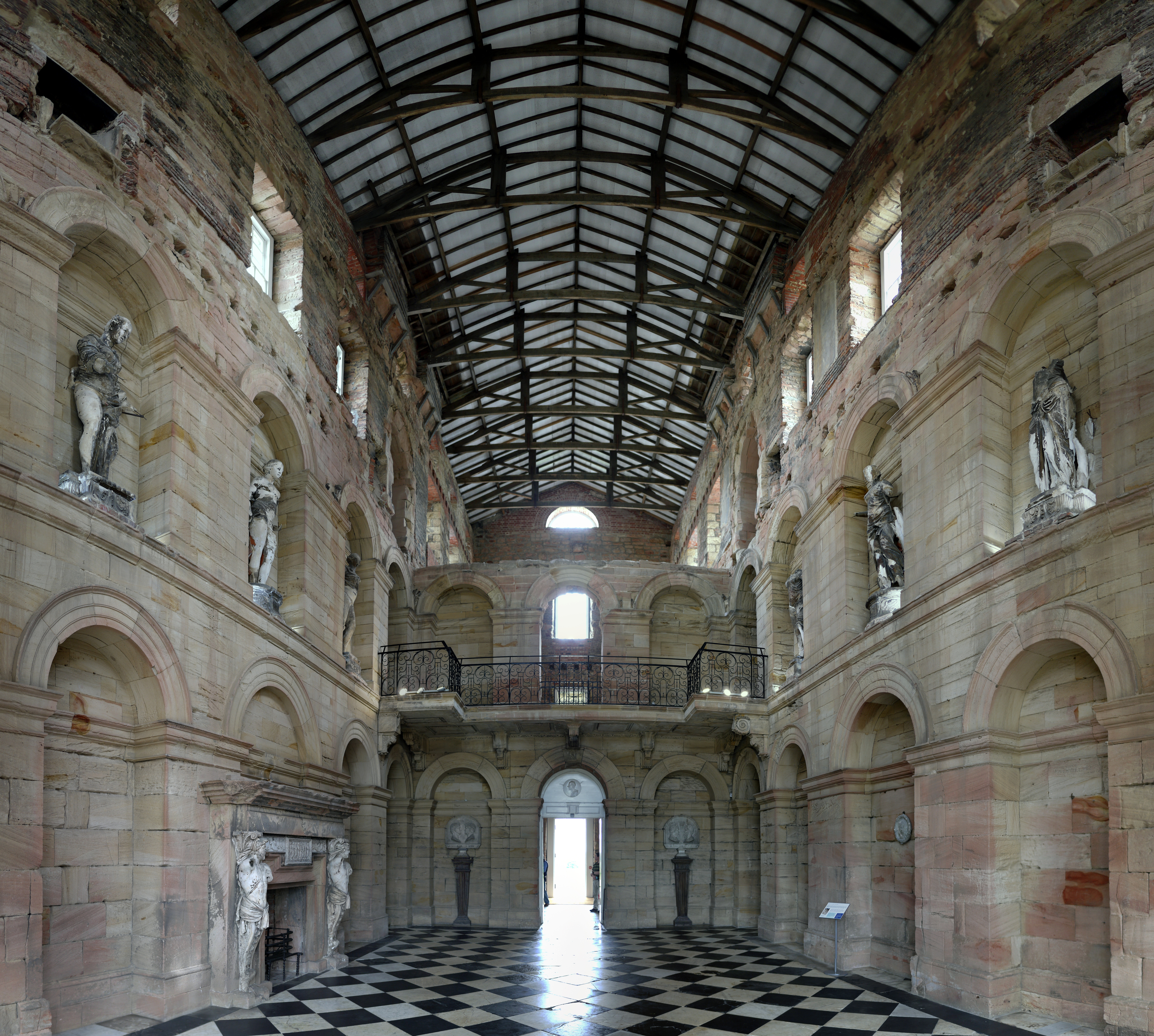
The inside of the central block's main entrance. The fire-damaged stucco statues at first-floor level are permanently affixed to the walls; the missing ceiling was destroyed in the fire of 1822. The roof is modern.

The style of architecture is known as English Baroque, based on the Palladian style introduced into the UK by Inigo Jones. The design is of a centre block portico, or corps de logis, containing the state and principal rooms, between two flanking wings. The wings have a centre projection of three bays, crowned by a pediment, either side of which are seven bays of sash windows above a ground floor arcade.

The west wing originally housed secondary and service accommodation. Damaged in an earlier fire but restored to the original plan, it is distinguished by a great colonnade and boasted a lofty vaulted kitchen, now a salon. The east wing contains the stables, a sixty-foot chamber of palatial design, with stalls and mangers of stone fit. They were reportedly inspired by the stables at Hopetoun House near Edinburgh, designed by Robert Adam. In 1768 Sir Francis Blake Delaval wrote thus to his brother: "I am putting up the grand stable on a plan we saw at Lord Hoptoun's when we were in Scotland, with stone divisions of the stalls." So pleased was he with the results that Sir Francis held a dinner party in the new stables. Between the two wings is a cour d'honneur, a great open courtyard 180 feet (55 m) long and 152.5 feet (46.5 m) broad.

John Delaval, the last male heir of the Delavals, who died young. Painted aged thirteen or fourteen by William Bell.

Also in the 400 acres (160 ha) estate park is a stone mausoleum, about half a mile east of the hall, which once had a majestic dome, now gone, but which retains a portico resting on huge monolithic columns. The mausoleum is surrounded by a circular ha-ha, a stone-faced ditch. It was erected by Lord Delaval to his only son, John, who died in 1775 aged 19, "as a result of having been kicked in a vital organ by a laundry maid to whom he was paying his addresses". No-one was ever buried in the mausoleum, which was never consecrated, and the unfortunate John Delaval was buried in St Peter's Doddington, Lincolnshire.

The mausoleum is now ruinous and its lead roof has gone. Also to the east in the walled garden is a south-facing orangery, designed by the architect William Etty, who collaborated with Vanbrugh. It has five glazed arches separated by Doric demi-columns. The statue in the forecourt in front of the house is a lead figure of David, with empty sling, lightly poised above the crouching form of Goliath, who has his thumbs doubled inside his palms. This is an 18th-century copy, possibly by John Cheere, of a 16th-century Italian marble by either Baccio Bandinelli or a follower of Giambologna. The statue has been repositioned from one of the corner bastions of the garden.

A large obelisk commands the fields to the south of the hall; the stub of a second can be found on the north side of the road running past the hall, next to the turning for New Hartley. This second obelisk marked the site where Admiral George Delaval was killed in a fall from his horse in 1723, before his new hall had been completed. Only the pedestal of the obelisk survives.

== Legend ==
As with many big old houses, Seaton Delaval Hall is alleged to have a ghost. According to family biographer Francis Askham:

There is a first-floor window on the North front of Seaton Delaval where, so it would seem from one particular part of the forecourt, a white-clad figure is standing. This, according to legend, is the White Lady, a girl who fell in love with the Delaval heir and died of a broken heart because the marriage was forbidden.

== See also ==
- Blenheim Palace, Oxfordshire (also by Vanbrugh)
- Castle Howard, North Yorkshire (also by Vanbrugh)
- Bavington Hall, Northumberland (bought by George Delaval in the eighteenth century)
- Dissington Hall, west of Newcastle (a previous seat of the Delaval family)
- Doddington Hall, Lincolnshire (which retains other Delaval family portraits)
- Ford Castle, Northumberland (owned by the Delaval family in the eighteenth century)
- Dilkusha Kothi (constructed in around 1800 on the banks of the Gomti near Lucknow in India for Gore Ouseley, and of very similar design to Seaton Delaval Hall; it now lies in ruins)

== Gallery ==
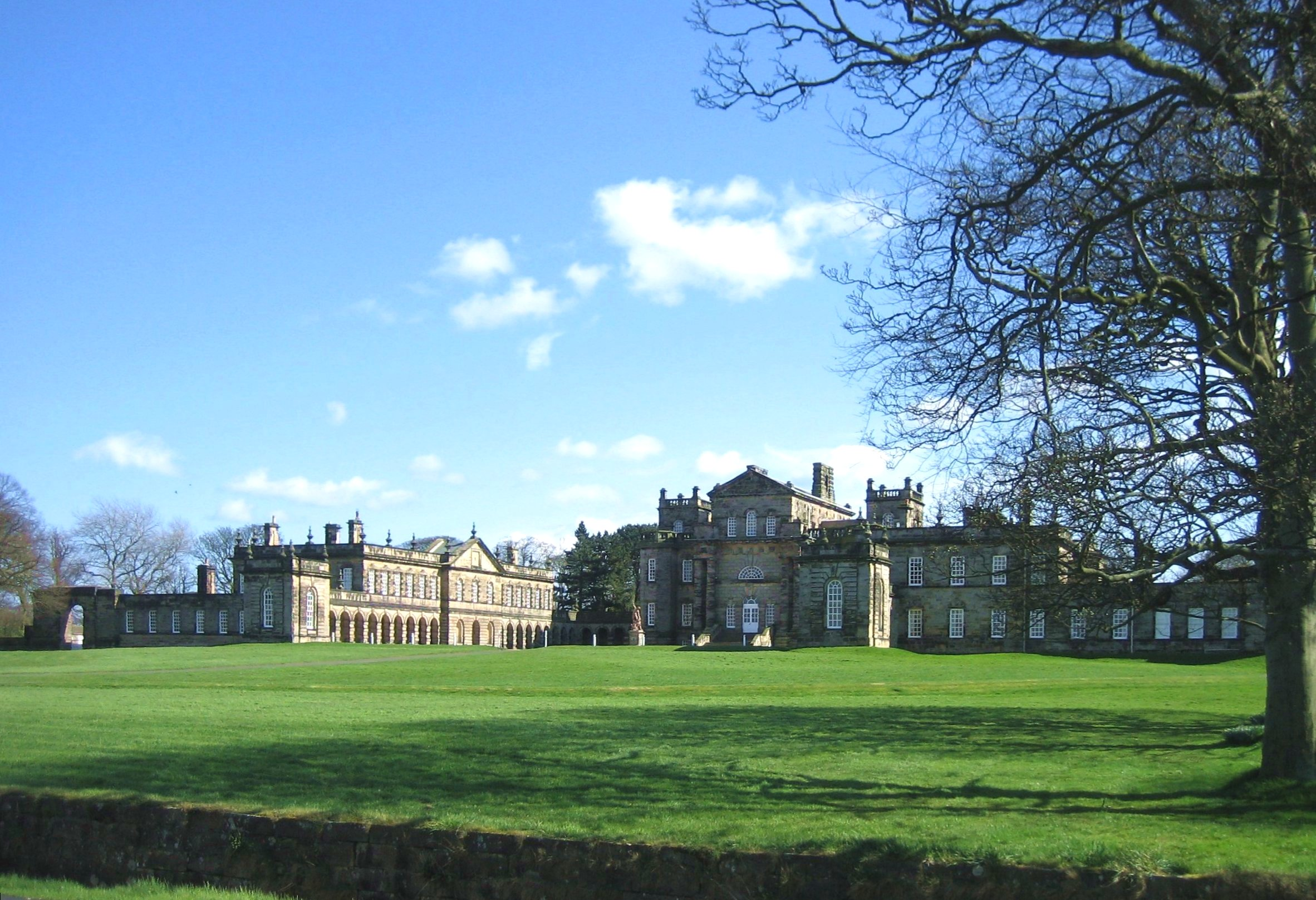
From the north-west

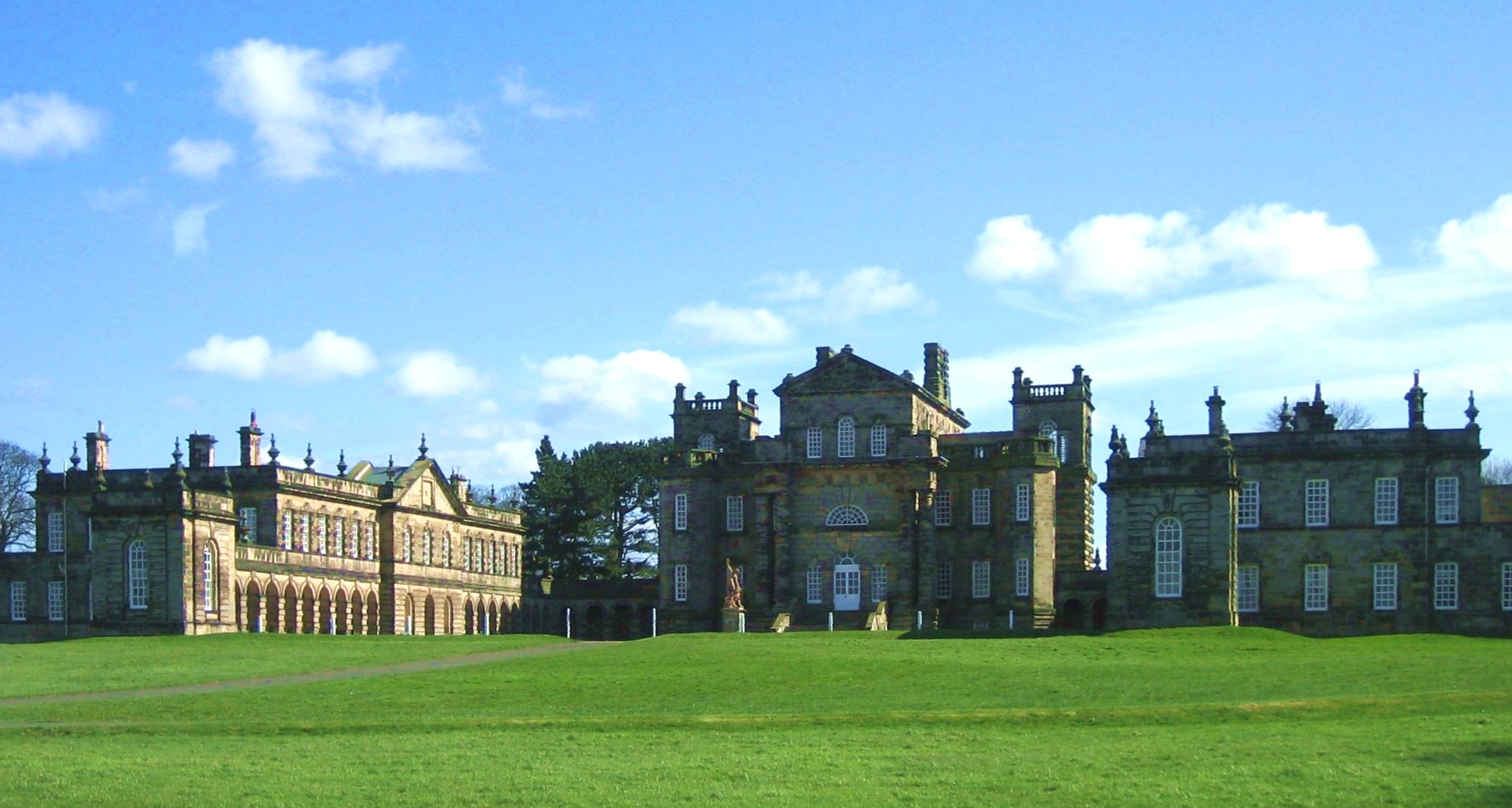
From the north-west

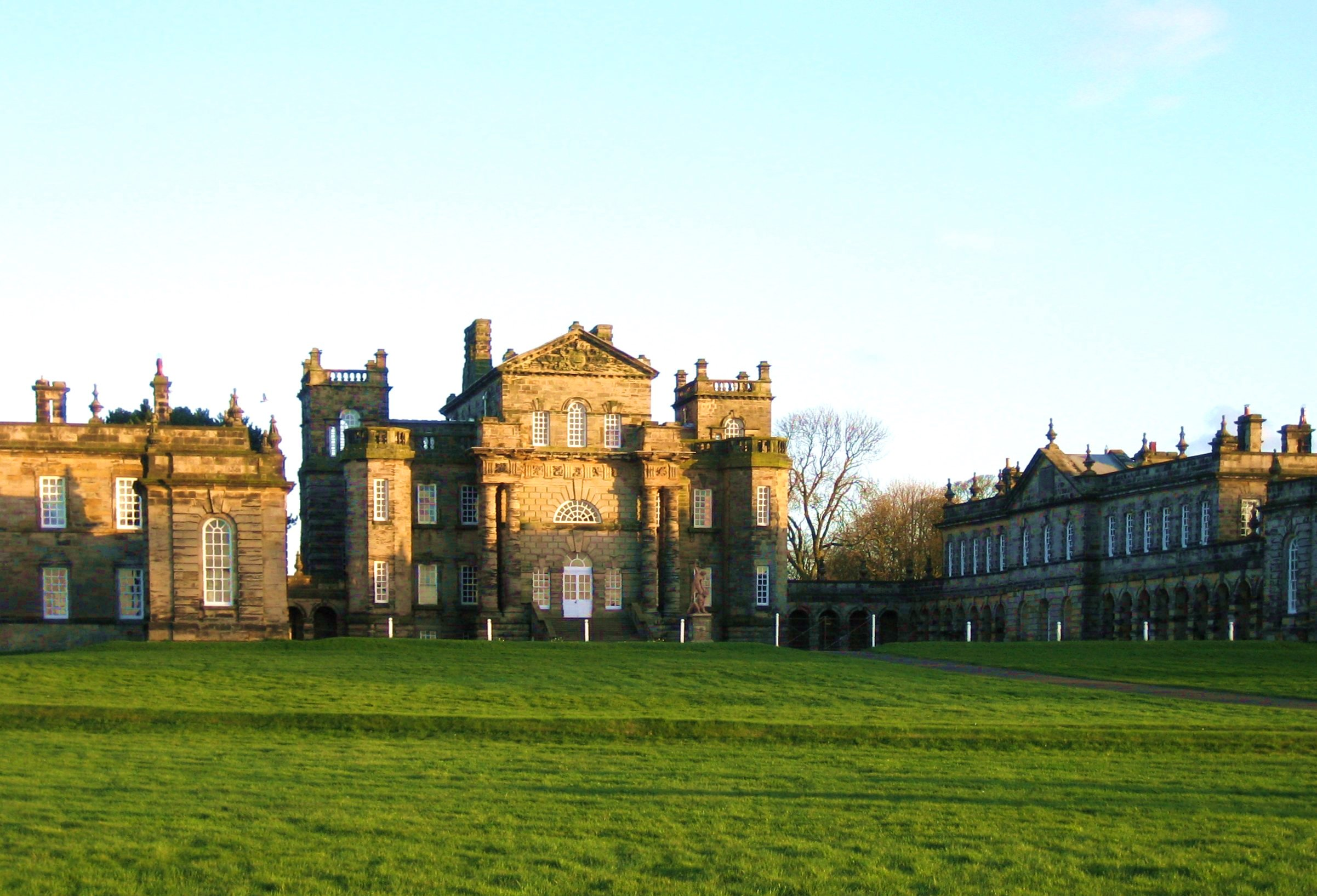
From the north

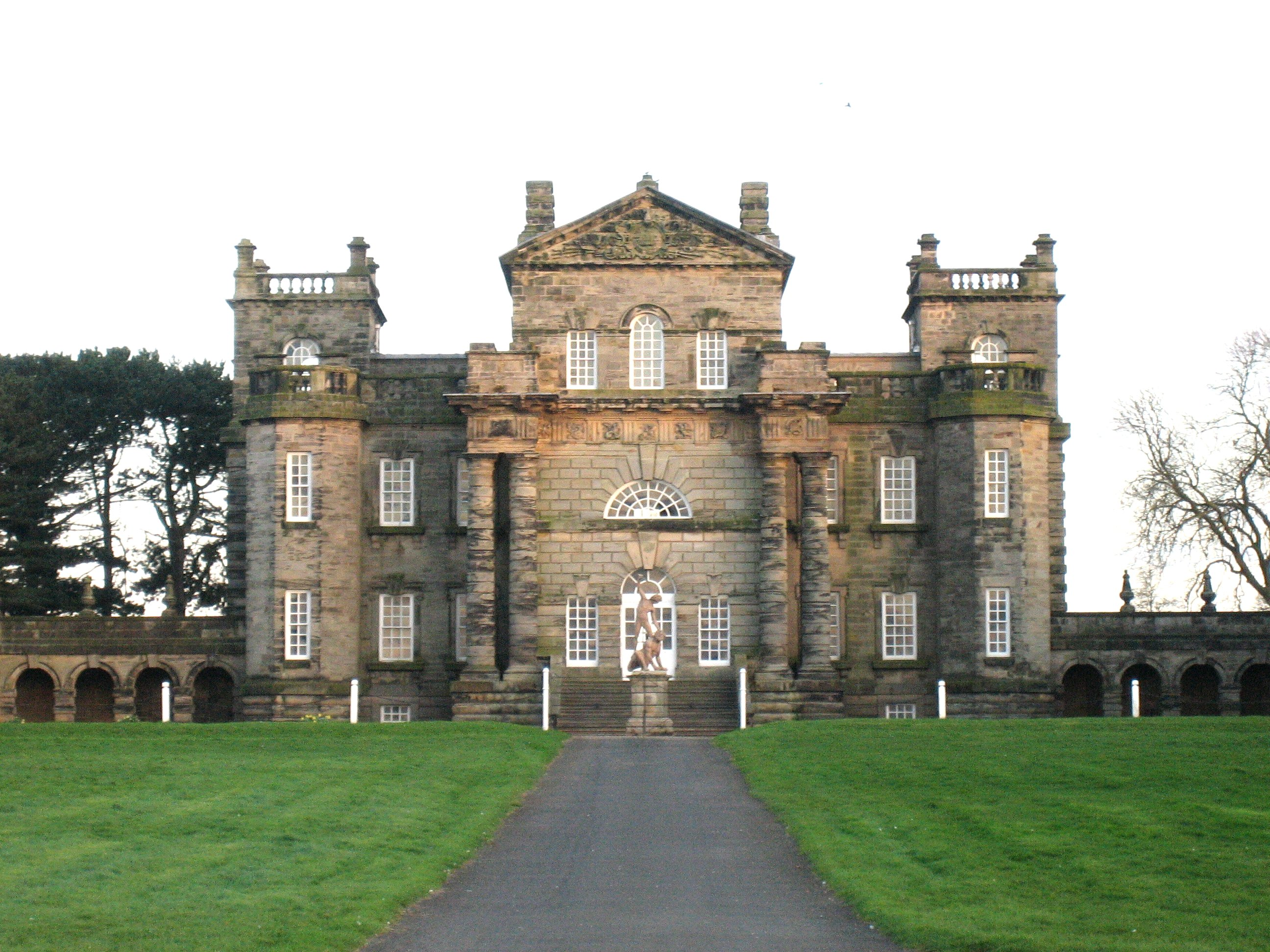
Central block from the north
