= Privilege of peerage =

Body of special privileges belonging to members of the British peerage

The privilege of peerage is the body of special privileges belonging to members of the British peerage. It is distinct from parliamentary privilege, which applies only to those peers serving in the House of Lords and the members of the House of Commons, while Parliament is in session and forty days before and after a parliamentary session.

The modern-day peerage is descended from the peerage of England created after the Norman conquest, the peerage of Scotland, and the peerage of Ireland. In each of these lands the peerage was originally a group of trusted advisors and favourites to the king, and depending on the country they were given several privileges that commoners did not have. Prime among them was the right and duty to advise the king on the exercise of his duties, but also included such ancillary features as receiving upgraded protections on defamation and even being hanged with a silk rope. As the peerages were merged under union acts in 1707 and 1800, the complexity of their privileges were merged and streamlined as needed.

These privileges have been lost and eroded over time. Only three privileges of peers as a class survived into the 20th century: the right to be tried by other peers of the realm instead of juries of commoners in cases of treason and felony, freedom from arrest in civil (but not criminal) cases, and access to the Sovereign to advise him or her on matters of state. The right to be tried by other peers in the House of Lords – which could not be waived, had long been considered a disadvantage rather than an advantage, and in practice entailed the House mimicking the advice of judges – was abolished at the request of the Lords in 1948. Legal opinion considers the right of freedom from arrest as extremely limited in application, if at all. The remaining privilege is not exercised, runs contrary to the principles of responsible government, and was recommended for formal abolition in 1999, but has never been formally revoked. The automatic right of hereditary peers to sit in the House of Lords was abolished in 1999, but life peers are unaffected. Some privileges have been granted to individual lords, but they too had been abolished by the end of the 20th century.

Peers also have several other rights not formally part of the privilege of peerage. For example, they are entitled to use coronets and supporters on their achievements of arms.

== Extent ==
The privilege of peerage extends to all temporal peers and peeresses regardless of their position in relation to the House of Lords. The right to sit in the House is separate from the privilege, and is held by only some peers (see History of reform of the House of Lords). Scottish peers from the Acts of Union 1707 and Irish peers from the Act of Union 1800, therefore, have the privilege of peerage. Since 1800, Irish peers have had the right to stand for election to the United Kingdom House of Commons but they lose the privilege of peerage for the duration of their service in the lower House. Since 1999, hereditary peers of England, Scotland, Great Britain, and the United Kingdom who are not members of the House of Lords may stand for election to the House of Commons. Their privilege of peerage is not explicitly lost by service in the lower House. Any peer issuing a disclaimer under the provisions of the Peerage Act 1963 loses all privileges of peerage. The privilege of peerage also extends to wives and widows of peers. A peeress by marriage loses the privilege upon marrying a commoner, but a peeress suo jure does not. Individuals who hold courtesy titles, however, do not have such privileges by virtue of those titles. The Lords Spiritual (the 26 archbishops and bishops who sit in the House of Lords) do not have the privilege of peerage as, at least since 1621, they have been Lords of Parliament, and not peers.

== Access to the Sovereign ==
The Sovereign is traditionally advised by various counsellors, including the peers of the realm. After the Norman Conquest of England, peers were summoned to form the magnum concilium, or Great Council, which was one of the four councils belonging to the Sovereign. The other three were the Privy Council, Parliament (which was called the commune concilium, or Common Council), and judges (who are considered counsellors of the Sovereign on legal matters).

A council composed only of peers was often summoned by early English kings. Such a council, having been in disuse for centuries, was revived in 1640, when Charles I summoned all of the peers of the realm using writs issued under the Great Seal. Though such a council has not been summoned since then and was considered obsolete at the time, each peer is commonly considered a counsellor of the Sovereign, and, according to Sir William Blackstone in 1765, "it is usually looked upon to be the right of each particular peer of the realm, to demand an audience of the King, and to lay before him, with decency and respect, such matters as he shall judge of importance to the public weal."

The privilege of access is no longer exercised, but it is possibly still retained by peers whether members of the House of Lords or not. In 1999, the Joint Committee on Parliamentary Privilege recommended the formal abolition of any remaining privilege of peerage.

== Scandalum magnatum ==
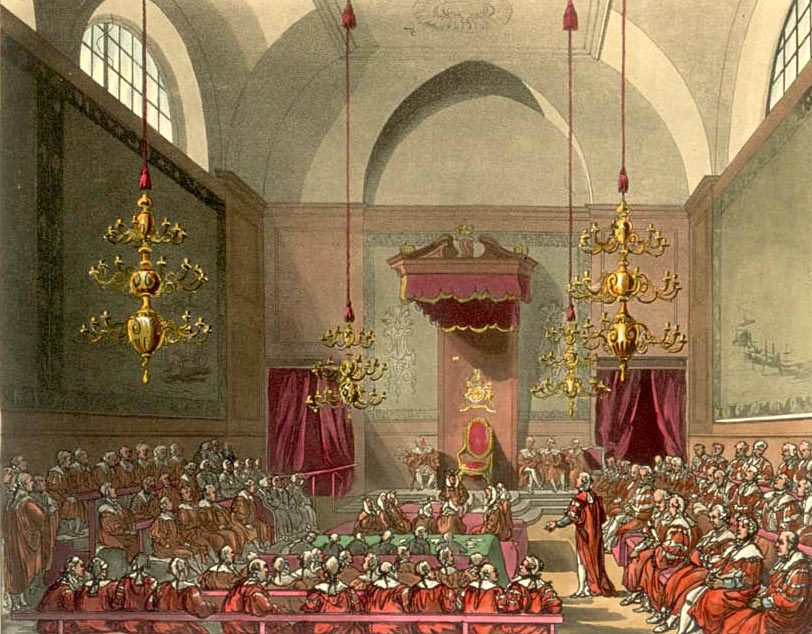
The House of Lords, c. 1810

At one time, the honour of peers was especially protected by the law; while defamation of a commoner was known as libel or slander, the defamation of a peer (or of a Great Officer of State) was called scandalum magnatum. Eighteenth-century jurist Sir William Blackstone opined:

The honour of peers is so highly tendered by the law, that it is much more penal to spread false reports of them, and certain other great officers of the realm, than of other men; scandal against them being called by the peculiar name of scandalum magnatum, and subject to peculiar punishments by divers ancient statutes.

Scandalum Magnatum Act 1378
- Act of Parliament
- Parliament of England
- Citation: 2 Ric. 2. Stat. 1. c. 5
- Territorial extent: England and Wales; Ireland

Dates
- Royal assent: 20 October 1378 (Note: Start of session.)
- Repealed: 16 September 1887

Other legislation
- Repealed by: Statute Law Revision Act 1887
- Relates to: Statute of Westminster 1275

Status: Repealed

Text of statute as originally enacted

The Statute of Westminster 1275 (3 Edw. 1), provided that "from henceforth none be so hardy to tell or publish any false News or Tales, whereby discord, or occasion of discord or slander may grow between the King and his People, or the Great Men of the Realm." Scandalum magnatum was punishable under the aforesaid statute as well as under further laws passed during the reign of Richard II. Scandalum magnatum was both a tort and a criminal offence. The prohibition on scandalum magnatum was first enforced by the King's Council. During the reign of Henry VII, the Star Chamber, a court formerly reserved for trial of serious offences such as rioting, assumed jurisdiction over scandalum magnatum cases, as well as libel and slander. The court, which sat without a jury and in secret, was often used as a political weapon and a device of royal tyranny, leading to its abolition in 1641; its functions in respect of defamation cases passed to the common law courts. However, the number of cases had already dwindled as the laws of libel, slander and contempt of court developed in its place. In the reign of Charles II, scandalum magnatum came briefly back into fashion; it was used by the future James II against Titus Oates, by Lord Gerard against his cousin Alexander Fitton, and by the Duke of Beaufort against John Arnold. By the end of the 18th century, however, scandalum magnatum was obsolete. This specific category of the offence of defamation was finally repealed by the Statute Law Revision Act 1887.

== Trial by peers ==
Trial of Peers Act 1341
- Act of Parliament
- Parliament of England
- Long title: The peers of the realm and great officers for great offences shall be tried in parliament.
- Citation: 15 Edw. 3 Stat. 1. c. 2
- Territorial extent: England and Wales; Ireland

Dates
- Royal assent: 1341
- Commencement: 23 April 1341
- Repealed: 23 April 1341

Other legislation
- Repealed by: 15 Edw. 3. Stat. 2

Status: Repealed

Text of statute as originally enacted

Just as commoners have a right to trial by a jury of their equals (other commoners), peers and peeresses formerly had a right to trial by other peers. The right of peers to trial by their own order was formalised during the 14th century. A statute, the Trial of Peers Act 1341 (15 Edw. 3 Stat. 1. c. 2) passed in 1341 provided:

Whereas before this time the peers of the land have been arrested and imprisoned, and their temporalities, lands, and tenements, goods and cattels, asseized in the King's hands, and some put to death without judgment of their peers: It is accorded and assented, that no peer of the land ... shall be brought in judgment to lose his temporalities, lands, tenements, goods and cattels, nor to be arrested, imprisoned, outlawed, exiled, nor forejudged, nor put to answer, nor be judged, but by award of the said peers in Parliament.

The privilege of trial by peers was still ill-defined, and the statute did not cover peeresses. In 1442, after an ecclesiastical court (which included King Henry VI of England, Henry Beaufort and John Kemp) found Eleanor, Duchess of Gloucester, guilty of witchcraft and banished her to the Isle of Man, a statute was enacted granting peeresses the right of trial by peers.

By the reign of Henry VII of England, there were two methods of trial by peers of the realm: trial in the House of Lords (or, in proper terms, by the High Court of Parliament) and trial in the Court of the Lord High Steward. The House of Lords tried the case if Parliament was in session; otherwise, trial was by the Lord High Steward's Court.

In the Lord High Steward's Court, a group of Lords Triers, sitting under the chairmanship of the Lord High Steward, acted as judge and jury. By custom, the number of Triers was not fewer than 23, so that a majority was a minimum of 12, but in fact, the number ranged from 20 to 35. The power to choose which peers served as Triers lay with the Crown and was sometimes subject to abuse, as only those peers who agreed with the monarch's position would be summoned to the Court of the Lord High Steward, thereby favouring the desired verdict. This practice was ended by the Treason Act 1695, passed during the reign of King William III. The Act required that all peers be summoned as Triers. All subsequent trials were held before the full House of Lords.

In the House of Lords, the Lord High Steward was the President or Chairman of the Court, and the entire House determined both questions of fact and questions of law as well as the verdict. By convention, Bishops and Archbishops did not vote on the verdict, though they were expected to attend during the course of the trial. They sat until the conclusion of the deliberations, and withdrew from the chamber just prior to the final vote. At the end of the trial, peers voted on the question before them by standing and declaring their verdict by saying "guilty, upon my honour" or "not guilty, upon my honour", starting with the most junior baron and proceeding in order of precedence ending with the Lord High Steward. For a guilty verdict, a majority of twelve was necessary. The entire House also determined the punishment to be imposed, which had to accord with the law. For capital crimes the punishment was death; the last peer to be executed was Laurence Shirley, 4th Earl Ferrers, who was hanged for murder in 1760.

By section 13 of the Treason Act 1547, if a peer or peeress was convicted of a crime, except treason or murder, he or she could claim benefit of clergy to escape punishment if it was a first offence. In all, the privilege was exercised five times, until it was formally abolished in 1841 when James Brudenell, 7th Earl of Cardigan, announced he would claim the privilege and avoid punishment if he was convicted of duelling. He was acquitted before the introduction of the bill.

A trial by the Lords – which a peer could not waive – was far more a burden than a privilege; unlike commoners, peers had no right to challenge the composition of the jury or to appeal any decision, and there was no leniency granted to those convicted in such a trial compared to commoners convicted of such offences. This was furthered by the fact that the Lords relied almost exclusively on the advice of royal counsel to make any decisions of fact or law. By the late 1930s, supporters of retaining the privilege were a minority in the Lords comprising mainly the holders of older peerages considering it a privilege of the House as a whole, whereas the majority favouring its abolition were holders of newly granted peerages resenting the difficulties such a trial gave to individual accused peers.

The last trial in the House of Lords was that of Edward Russell, 26th Baron de Clifford, in 1935 for manslaughter (he was acquitted); the following year the Lords passed a bill to abolish trial by peers but the Commons ignored it. The right to trial by peers was abolished when the Lords added an amendment to the Criminal Justice Act 1948, which the Commons accepted. Now peers are tried by juries composed of commoners, though peers were themselves excused from jury service until the House of Lords Act 1999 restricted this privilege to members of the House of Lords. The right to be excused was abolished on 5 April 2004 by the Criminal Justice Act 2003.

Peers were and still are, hypothetically, subject to impeachment. Impeachment was a procedure distinct from the aforementioned procedure of trial in the House of Lords, though the House of Lords is the court in both cases. Charges were brought by the House of Commons, not a grand jury. Additionally, while in normal cases the House of Lords tried peers only for felonies or treason, in impeachments the charges could include felonies, treason and misdemeanours. The case directly came before the House of Lords, rather than being referred to it by a writ of certiorari. The Lord High Steward presided only if a peer was charged with high treason; otherwise, the Lord Chancellor presided. Other procedures in trials of impeachment were similar, however, to trials before the House of Lords: at the conclusion of the trial, the spiritual peers withdrew, and the temporal Lords gave their votes on their honour. The last impeachment was that of Henry Dundas, 1st Viscount Melville, in 1806 for misappropriating public money (he was acquitted). Since then, impeachment has become an obsolete procedure in the United Kingdom.

The novel Clouds of Witness (1926) by Dorothy L. Sayers depicts the fictional trial in the House of Lords of a duke who is accused of murder. Sayers researched and used the then-current trial procedures. The comedy film Kind Hearts and Coronets (1949) from Ealing Studios features an almost identical scene.

== Freedom from arrest ==
The privilege of freedom from arrest applies to members of both Houses of Parliament, because of the principle that they must, whenever possible, be available to give advice to the Sovereign. Several other nations have copied this provision; the Constitution of the United States, for example, provides, "The Senators and Representatives ... shall in all Cases, except Treason, Felony and Breach of the Peace, be privileged from Arrest during their Attendance at the Session of their respective Houses." Theoretically, even when Parliament is not sitting, peers enjoy the privilege because they continue to serve the Sovereign as counsellors. However, peers are free from arrest in civil cases only; arrests in criminal matters are not covered by the privilege. Until 1770, a peer's domestic servants were also covered by the privilege of freedom from arrest in civil matters.

Most often the privilege was applied in cases of imprisonment in debtors' prisons. In 1870, both imprisonment for debt and the privilege in relation to freedom from arrest for bankruptcy were abolished, and as a result, the freedom became extremely limited in practical application. Now, civil proceedings involve arrests only when an individual disobeys a court order. Since 1945, the privilege of freedom from arrest in civil cases has arisen in only two cases: Stourton v Stourton (1963) and Peden International Transport, Moss Bros, The Rowe Veterinary Group and Barclays Bank plc v Lord Mancroft (1989). In the latter most recent case, the trial judge considered the privilege obsolete and inapplicable, and said in proceedings, "the privilege did not apply—indeed ... it is unthinkable in modern times that, in circumstances such as they are in this case, it should".

== Privilege myths ==
Fanciful tales of peers with whimsical privileges circulate, such as that of the right to wear a hat in the presence of the Sovereign (actually a right of Spanish grandees). The most persistent example of such a legend is that of the Kingsale hat. According to the fable, John de Courcy, Earl of Ulster, obtained from King John the privilege of remaining covered in the presence of the Sovereign. Though the tale is untrue—de Courcy was never made an earl and did not receive such a privilege—several authorities on the peerage have seen fit to repeat it. A 19th-century edition of Burke's Peerage suggests the origins of the privilege:

... the Earl of Ulster was treacherously seized while performing penance, unarmed and barefooted, in the churchyard of Downpatrick, on Good Friday, anno 1203, and sent over to England, where the king condemned him to perpetual imprisonment in the Tower ... After de Courcy had been in confinement about a year, a dispute happening to arise between King John and Philip Augustus of France concerning the Duchy of Normandy, the decision of which being referred to single combat, King John, more hasty than advised, appointed the day, against which the King of France provided his champion; but the King of England, less fortunate, could find no one of his subjects willing to take up the gauntlet, until his captive in the Tower, the stout Earl of Ulster, was prevailed upon to accept the challenge. But when everything was prepared for the contest, and the champions had entered the lists, in presence of the Kings of England, France and Spain, the opponent of the earl, seized with a sudden panic, put spurs to his horse, and fled the arena; whereupon the victory was adjudged by acclamation to the champion of England. The French king being informed, however, of the earl's powerful strength, and wishing to witness some exhibition of it, de Courcy, at the desire of King John, cleft a massive helmet in twain at a single blow.

To reward his singular performance, King John supposedly granted de Courcy the privilege of remaining covered in the presence of the Sovereign. The 1823 edition of Debrett's Peerage gives an entirely fictitious account of how Almericus de Courcy, 23rd Baron Kingsale, asserted the privilege:

Being very handsome in his person, and of a tall stature, his lordship one day attended King William's court, and being admitted into the presence-chamber, asserted the privilege of being covered before his majesty, by walking to and fro with his hat on his head. The king observing him, sent one of his attendants to inquire the reason of his appearance before him with his head covered; to whom he replied, he knew very well in whose presence he stood, and the reason why he wore his hat that day was, because he stood before the king of England. This answer being told the king, and his lordship approaching nearer the throne, was required by his majesty to explain himself, which he did to this effect: "May it please your majesty, my name is Courcy, and I am Lord of Kingsale in your kingdom of Ireland: the reason of my appearing covered in your majesty's presence is, to assert the ancient privilege of my family, granted to sir John de Courcy, earl of Ulster, and his heirs, by John, king of England, for him and his successors for ever." The king replied, he remembered he had such a nobleman, and believed the privilege he asserted to be his right, and giving him his hand to kiss, his lordship paid his obeisance, and remained covered.

Despite such inaccuracies, the tale has been frequently repeated. Individual privileges that did exist have fallen into disuse—for example the Lord of the Manor of Worksop (which is not a peerage) was extended to the privilege and duty of attending the coronation of the British monarch until 1937, but the right was not exercised at the coronation of Queen Elizabeth II in 1953 as the manor was under corporate ownership at the time.

== See also ==
- Judicial functions of the House of Lords
- List of trials of peers in the House of Lords
