= Worksop Manor =

18th-century country house in England

Coordinates: 53°17′46″N 01°08′49″W

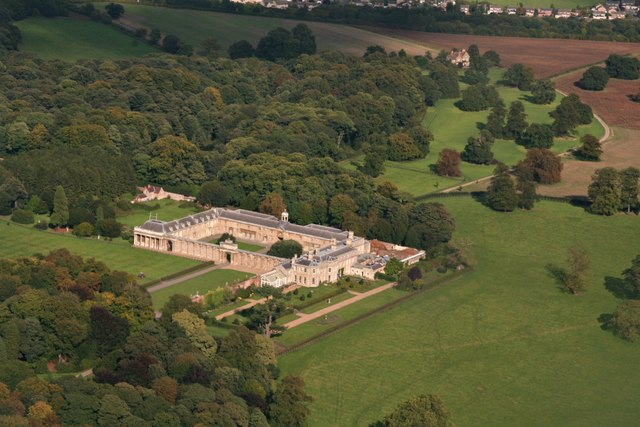
- Worksop Manor (former service wing of both the Smythson and Pain house at Worksop manor)

- Location within Nottinghamshire

General information
- Location: Worksop, Nottinghamshire

Listed Building – Grade I
- Official name: Worksop Manor
- Designated: 13 February 1967
- Reference no.: 1370406

Worksop Manor is a Grade I listed country house situated in Bassetlaw, Nottinghamshire, England, within the area of the four contiguous ducal estates historically known as the Dukeries. The present building, constructed in ashlar stone with hipped slate roofs and forming a quadrangle approximately 25 bays wide by 14 bays deep, represents the surviving remnant of what was once one of the most ambitious country house projects ever conceived in England.

The estate has medieval origins, with a deer park recorded from around 1161. A hunting lodge was erected by the 4th Earl of Shrewsbury in the 1530s. In the 1580s a magnificent new house was raised for George Talbot, 6th Earl of Shrewsbury, almost certainly to the designs of Robert Smythson. Comprising approximately 500 rooms and set within a park of over 2,300 acres, it was a leading example of the Elizabethan prodigy house. The manor served as a place of imprisonment for Mary, Queen of Scots in 1580, and subsequently received members of the Stuart royal family in the early seventeenth century.

Ownership passed through marriage to the Howard family, Dukes of Norfolk, in the early seventeenth century. Under the 8th and 9th Dukes the house was substantially enlarged and its gardens extensively remodelled. In October 1761 a catastrophic fire destroyed the Smythson house entirely, at a loss estimated at £100,000. The architect James Paine was commissioned to design a palatial replacement, intended for the nephew of the childless 9th Duke. The successive deaths of the expected heirs in 1763 and 1767 brought work to a halt with only one wing complete. The unfinished structure fell into neglect after 1777 and was largely demolished in the late 1830s by the 4th Duke of Newcastle, who acquired the estate principally to extend his neighbouring landholdings at Clumber Park.

The surviving portions — the stable block, service wing, and part of the eastern range — were subsequently reformed into the present house, which has been in private ownership since the late nineteenth century and is not open to the public. The estate is home to the Worksop Manor Stud, a thoroughbred breeding establishment in operation since at least 1890.

The Lords of the Manor of Worksop hold their tenure by the ancient feudal privilege of grand serjeanty, which obliges them to present the sovereign with a glove and to support the royal right arm during the coronation ceremony — a custom observed at British coronations from at least the reign of James II. Worksop Manor was the seat of the ancient Lords of Worksop.

== History ==
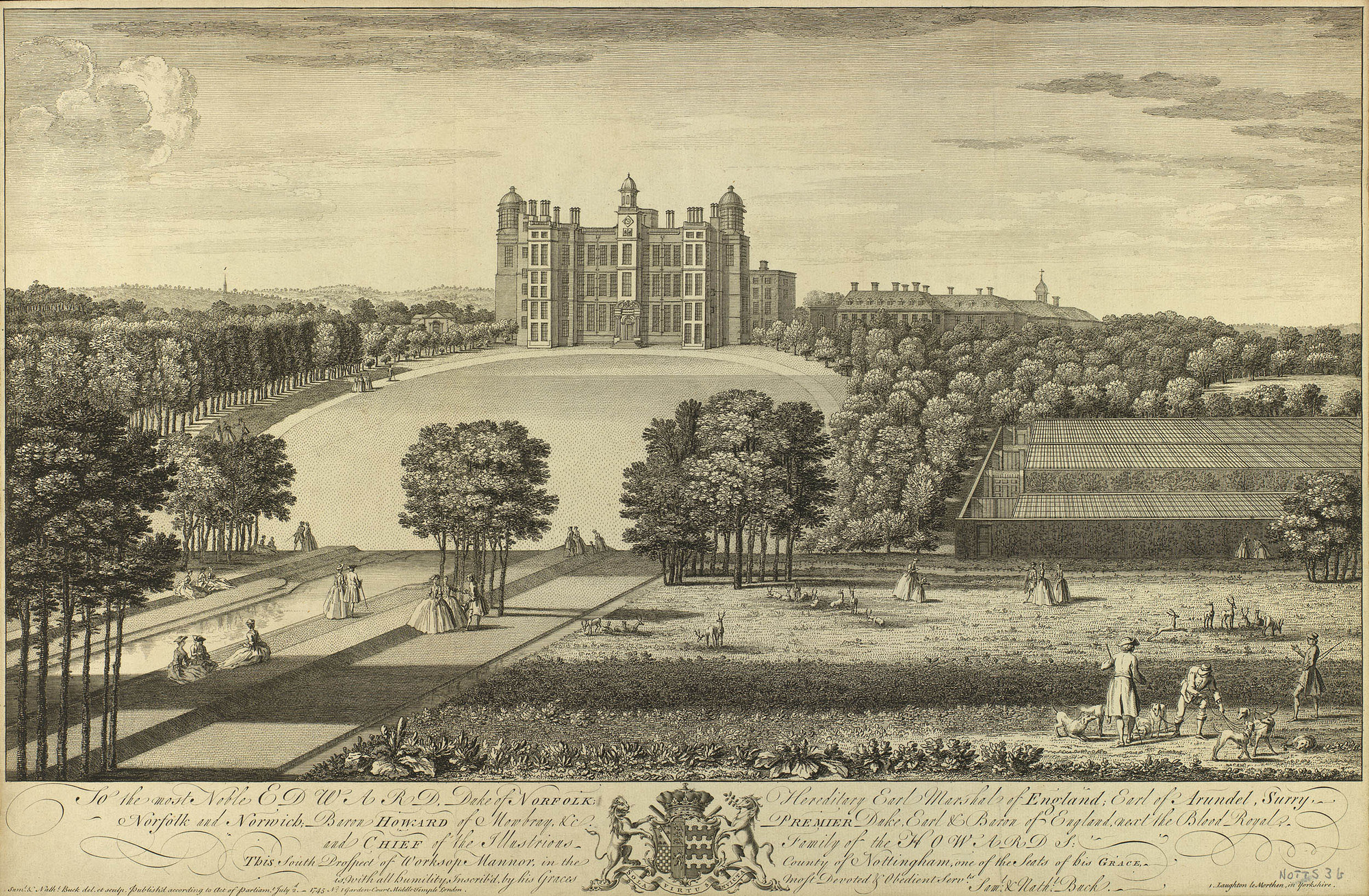
The South Front seen from a distance with the service wing to the right

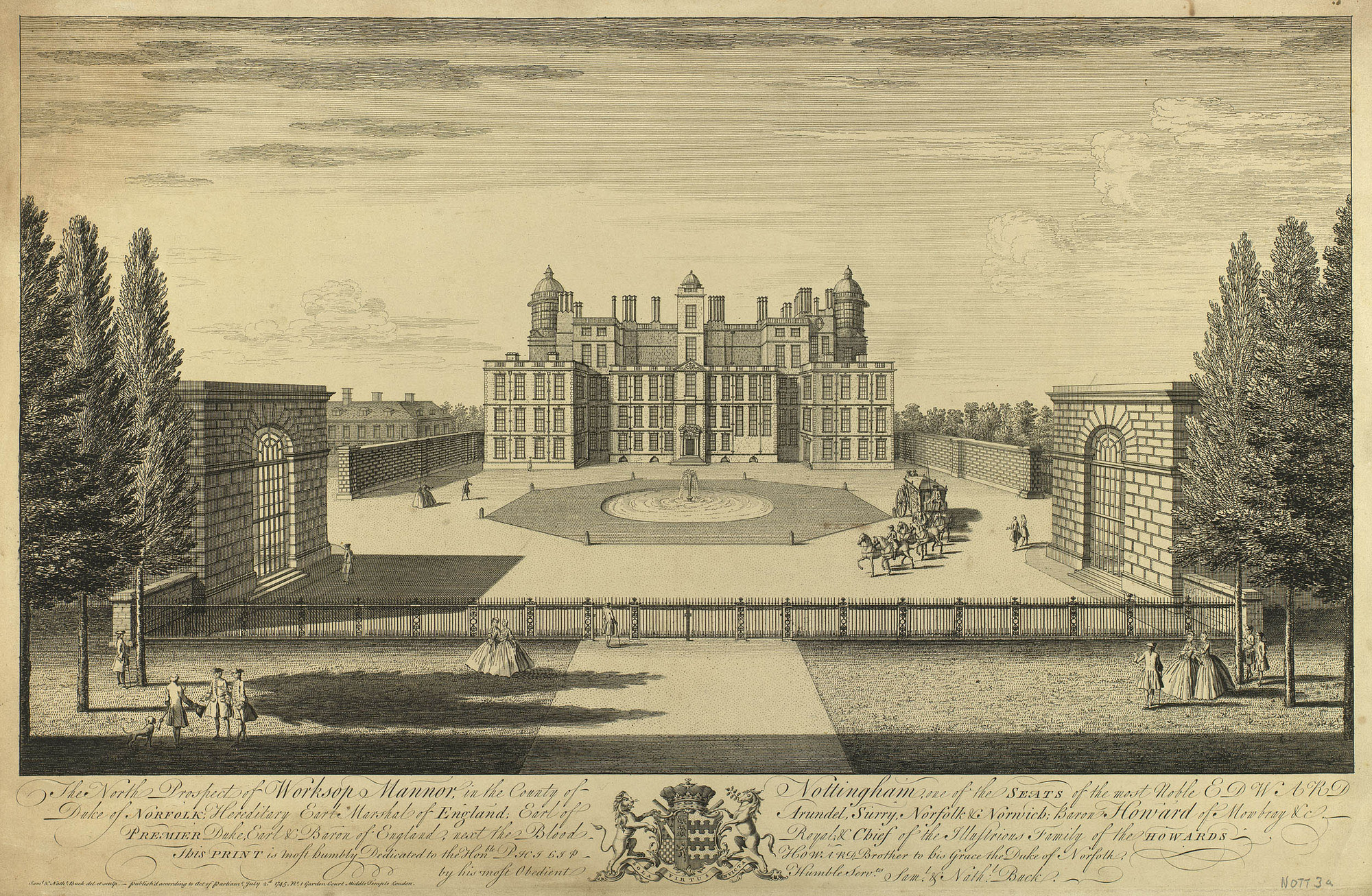
The North Front

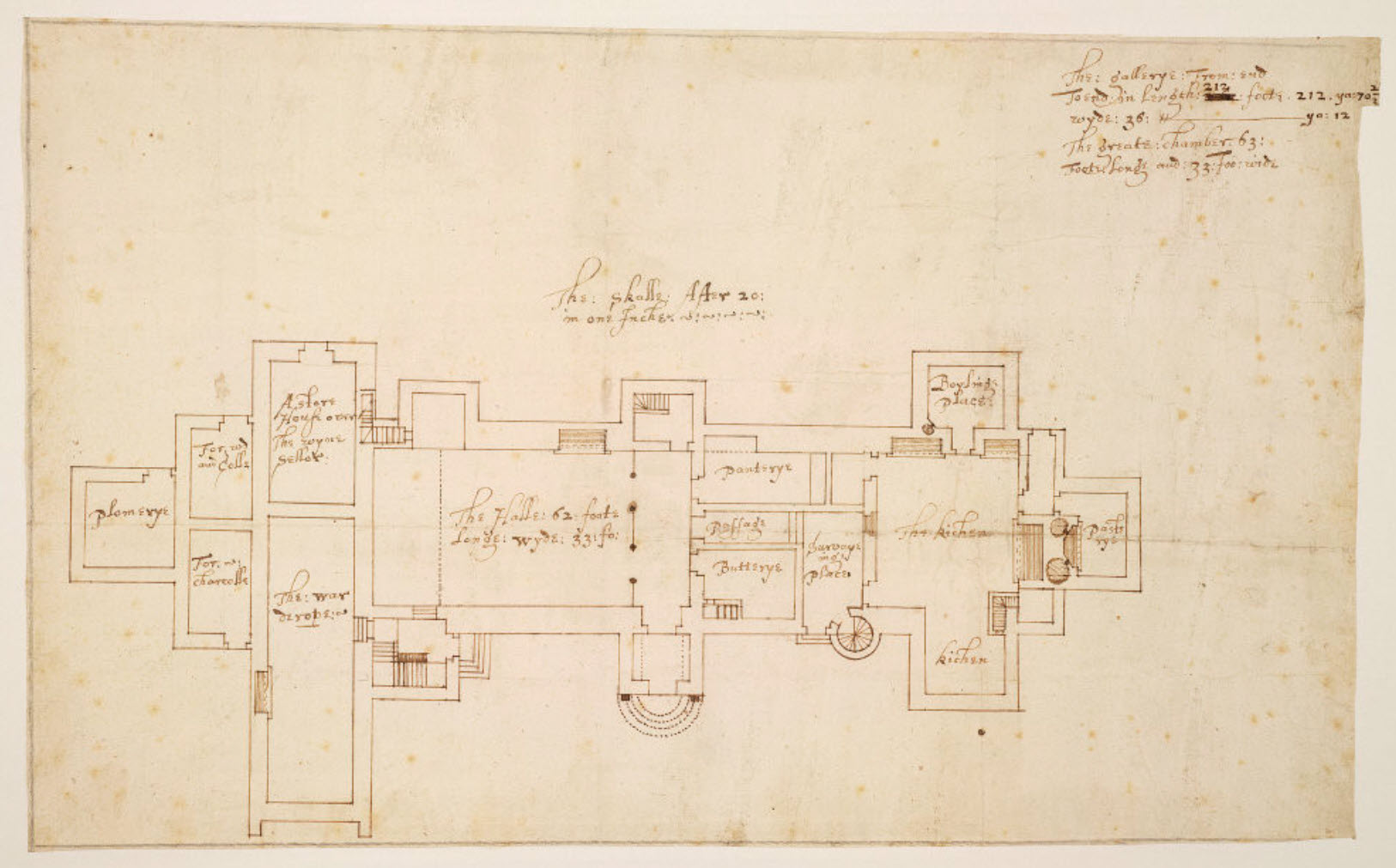
The ground floor plan of the Smythson house

=== Medieval Origins ===
The estate traces its origins to a medieval deer park established around 1161. The manor passed to William de Lovetot by the early twelfth century, and in the 1120s he founded and endowed a priory of the Augustinian order nearby. An initial hunting lodge was erected around 1538 by George Talbot, 4th Earl of Shrewsbury. The medieval settlement grew up between the castle and the priory, and by the fourteenth century the priory had acquired an impressive gatehouse. The castle itself had largely vanished by the 1540s, when the antiquary John Leland noted it was clene down and scant knowen wher it was.

=== The Talbot Era and the Elizabethan Prodigy House (1580s) ===
The Talbot family had owned Worksop Manor since the 14th century. In the 1580s a new house was built on the site for the very wealthy George Talbot, 6th Earl of Shrewsbury — husband of Bess of Hardwick — probably designed by Robert Smythson. Comprising approximately 500 rooms, it was a leading example of the Elizabethan prodigy house. Described in 1636 as a very stately house... built of freestone, being very pleasantly situated upon a hill, with gardens corresponding to the same, it was particularly admired for its long gallery on the top storey, where one chimneypiece bore the date "1585".

At the same time, Smythson also designed the associated Worksop Manor Lodge for Roger Portington, keeper of the Worksop parks. The lodge was compared in grandeur to the Medici Villa di Pratolino and survived in substantially original form until 2007, when it was destroyed by fire; restoration is currently underway.

The reputation of the house spread widely: in 1607, George Chaworth wrote to Gilbert Talbot, 7th Earl of Shrewsbury that the long gallery being built by George Home, 1st Earl of Dunbar at Berwick Castle would make the gallery at Worksop — raised by Gilbert's own father — look like a mere garret.

=== Mary, Queen of Scotts ===
The political entanglements of the 6th Earl of Shrewsbury brought a most distinguished — and most inconvenient — guest to Worksop. As one of the principal custodians appointed by Queen Elizabeth I, the Earl was tasked with the imprisonment of Mary, Queen of Scots, and the manor house served as her place of confinement for a period in 1580. The presence of such a prisoner within his walls placed enormous strain upon the Earl's finances and marriage alike; his relationship with Bess of Hardwick ultimately collapsed in large part under the burdens of the custody.

=== Royal Visits under the Stuarts ===
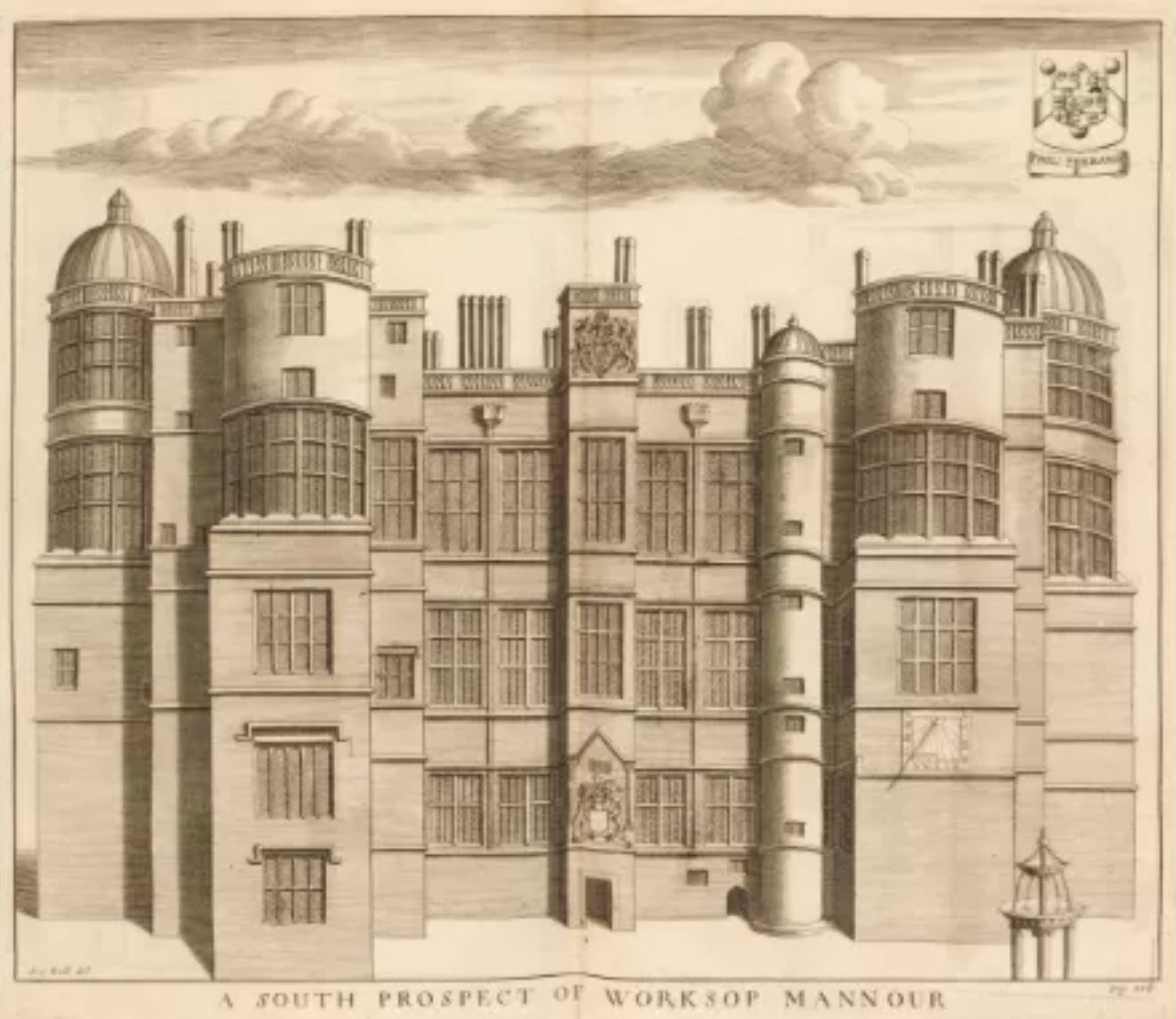
The south front (1677)

After the death of Elizabeth I, the house passed briefly to Gilbert Talbot, 7th Earl of Shrewsbury, and Worksop became a staging post for the new Stuart dynasty. King James VI of Scotland, proclaimed James I of England in 1603, stayed at the manor after the Union of the Crowns on his journey south to take the throne of England. Shortly afterwards, in June of the same year, his Queen, Anne of Denmark, held court there on the King's birthday, the 19th of June. The occasion was evidently a lively one: kitchen accounts mention Polish and Bolognese sausages, Westphalia bacon, and two Frenchmen specially engaged to fold napkins. Anne gave a jewel to young William Cecil, son of Sir Robert Cecil, tying it in his ear herself, and the boy danced with the seven-year-old Princess Elizabeth. . Finding a quiet moment, the Queen wrote a letter in German to her brother Christian IV of Denmark, signing it from im Pallast das Graffn von Schrosbery — the palace of the Earl of Shrewsbury. Her large crowd of followers was disorderly, and the Duke of Lennox and the Earls of Shrewsbury and Cumberland made a proclamation at Worksop that her followers should put aside any private quarrels, and hangers-on without formal roles should leave.

In August 1604, the young Prince Charles — the future Charles I — also passed through, accompanied by his physician Dr Henry Atkins, who recorded four days of music and the prince's first initiation into the hunt, with deer driven close to the house for his benefit.

=== The Howard Years (late 17th century – 1761) ===
At the end of the seventeenth century, the estate passed by marriage to the Dukes of Norfolkk — a consequence of the union between a daughter of Gilbert Talbot, 7th Earl of Shrewsbury and one of the Howards, Earl Marshal of England. In 1701, Thomas Howard, 8th Duke of Norfolk undertook a substantial programme of works: he doubled the size of the house, modernised the Elizabethan structure by installing sash windows and squaring off the towers, built new stables and offices on the east side of the forecourt, and laid out extensive formal gardens. The celebrated ironworker Jean Tijou supplied and installed ironwork in 1702. From 1710 to 1729 large plantations were established across the northern part of the park, and the 8th Duke created a triple avenue running east from the new offices. Formal gardens lay to the south and west of the house, with a lawn, an octagonal basin, and a canal extending to the edge of the park. The landscape designer Charles Bridgeman subsequently redesigned the gardens around 1720.

Edward Howard, 9th Duke of Norfolk — who had succeeded in 1732 after the death of his childless elder brother Thomas — made Worksop his principal country residence and continued improving both house and grounds. In the 1750s, Lancelot "Capability" Brown planted trees around the Manor Hills, and in 1758 John Platt undertook further landscaping of the eastern and southern areas of the park.

=== The Duchess's Renovation and the Fire of 1761 ===
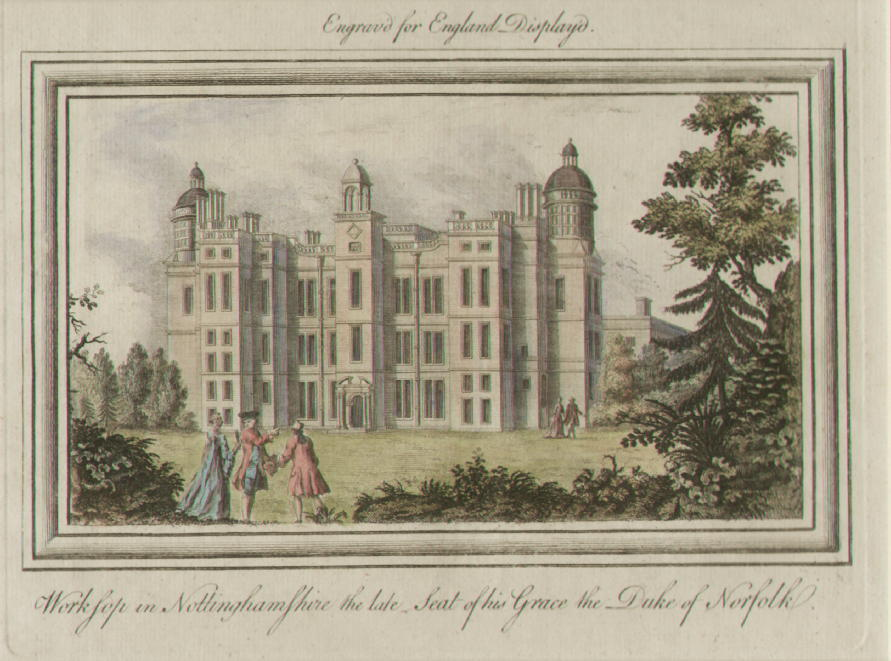
The South Front in the 18th century

The 9th Duke's wife, Mary Howard, Duchess of Norfolk, was by all accounts a woman of considerable intelligence, energy, and artistic sensibility. Finding the old Smythson house in need of renewal, she threw herself into an ambitious programme of renovation that consumed several years and some £22,000 — an enormous outlay. In August 1761, the Duke and Duchess marked the completion of the works with a magnificent celebratory party.

The festivities proved tragically premature. Two months later, whilst the couple were staying in Bath, fire broke out at the manor. Starting in the library, it raged for two days, fanned by strong winds, consuming the entire vast structure. The house — all 500 rooms of it — was reduced to ruins, taking with it the library, a valuable collection of paintings, magnificent furniture, and part of the famous Arundelian marbles. The total loss was estimated at £100,000: a devastating sum, made all the more bitter by the fact that the renovation had been very nearly complete when the flames took hold.

=== James Paine's Rebuilding — and its Tragic Halt (1761–1767) ===
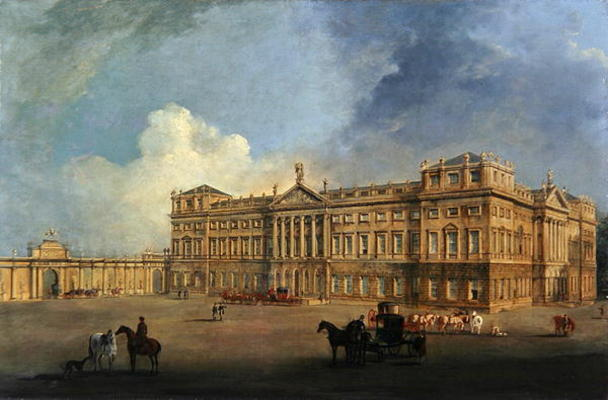
Worksop Manor as designed by James Paine, only one wing was realized (1777)

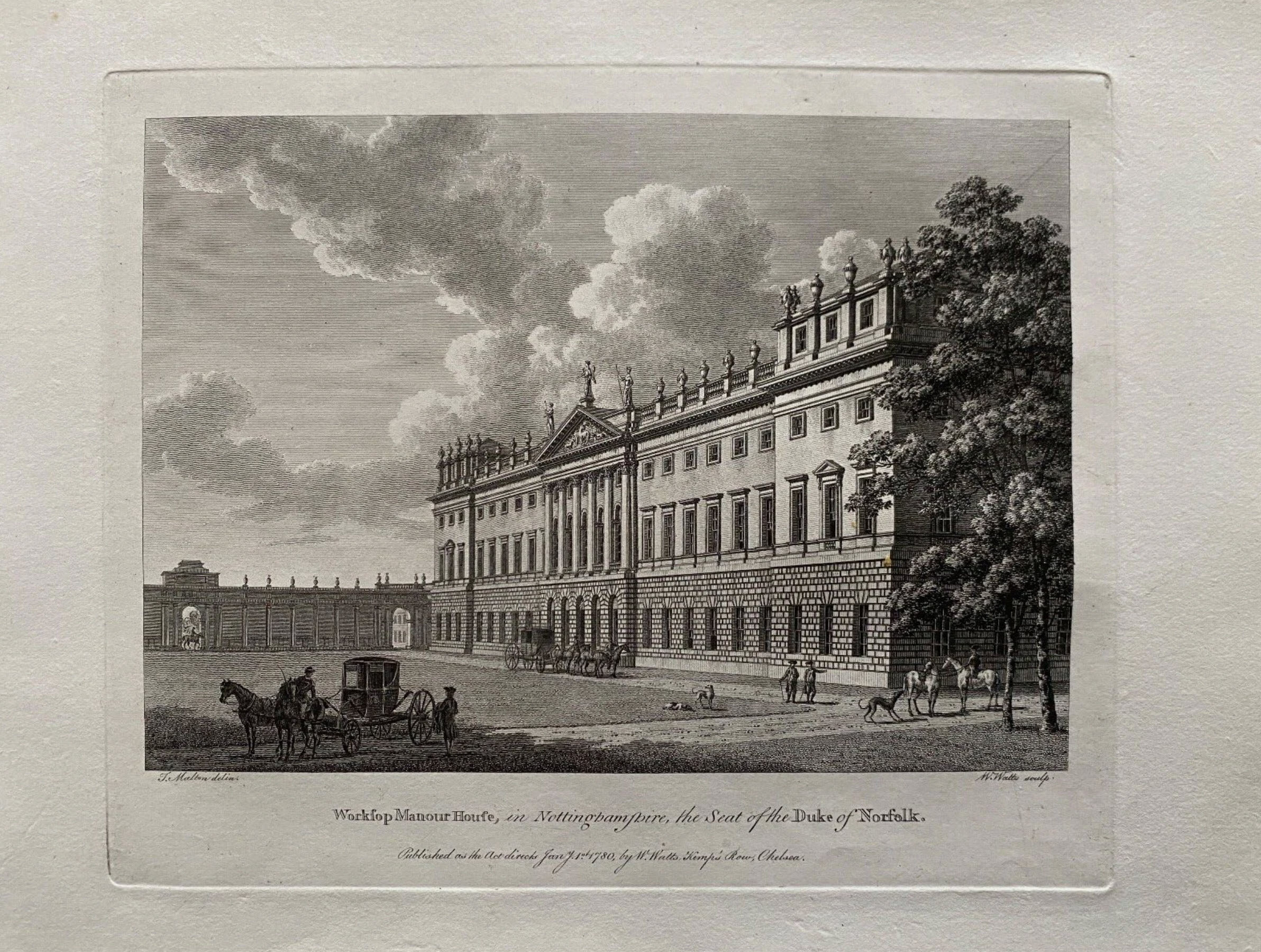
The North Front (1804)

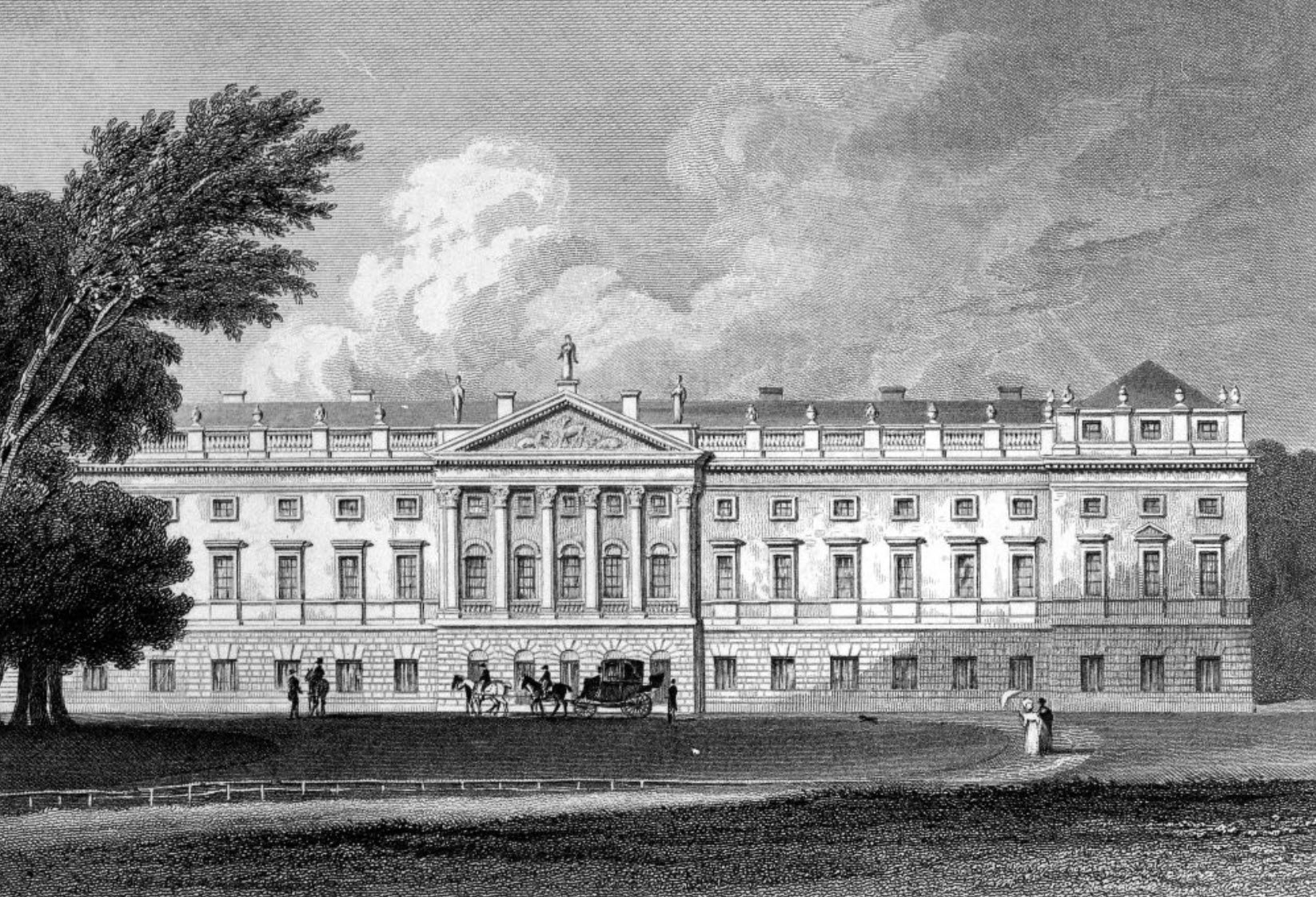
The North Front by John Preston Neale (1820)

Later that same year, the indefatigable Duchess commissioned the architect James Paine to design a replacement on an altogether grander scale, to rival Blenheim Palace. The couple were childless, and the new house was expressly intended for the benefit of their nephew Thomas Howard, heir presumptive to the dukedom. It is said that some of the finest elements of the design were suggested by the Duchess herself, who took an active supervisory role throughout, and whose vision the building very much embodied. The sculptor William Collins executed a monumental carved pediment to her design in 1765, adorned with allegorical figures of Virtue, Peace, and Plenty, and surmounted by emblems of the ancient Norfolk alliances — lion, horse, and hound. On the western side of the principal group, a relief depicted the old manor house as it had appeared before the fire.

Paine's plans were of extraordinary ambition. He envisaged a roughly square mansion built around a vast central courtyard, with a stone façade some 303 feet in length, a Corinthian portico of six columns at the centre, and a colonnaded screen concealing the stable court to the north-east. Had it been completed, the house would in all likelihood have been the largest private residence in England. The service wing of 1701–4 was retained and incorporated into the new scheme.

Work began in earnest, but it was never to be finished. The deaths of Thomas Howard in 1763, and of his half-brother Edward — the next in line — in 1767, destroyed at a stroke both the human purpose and the emotional momentum behind the project. Work ceased that same year, with only the north wing complete. The Duchess never recovered from these successive bereavements, dying not long afterwards. The 9th Duke, though he continued to improve the estate in a more modest fashion, lived on to the remarkable age of 91, dying in 1777.

==== Worksop Manor in Plans, Elevations and Sections of Noblemen and Gentlemen’s Houses and also of Stabling, Bridges, Public and Private, Temples, and other Garden Buildings executed in the counties of Derby, Durham, Middlesex, Northumberland, Nottingham and York by James Paine (1783) ====
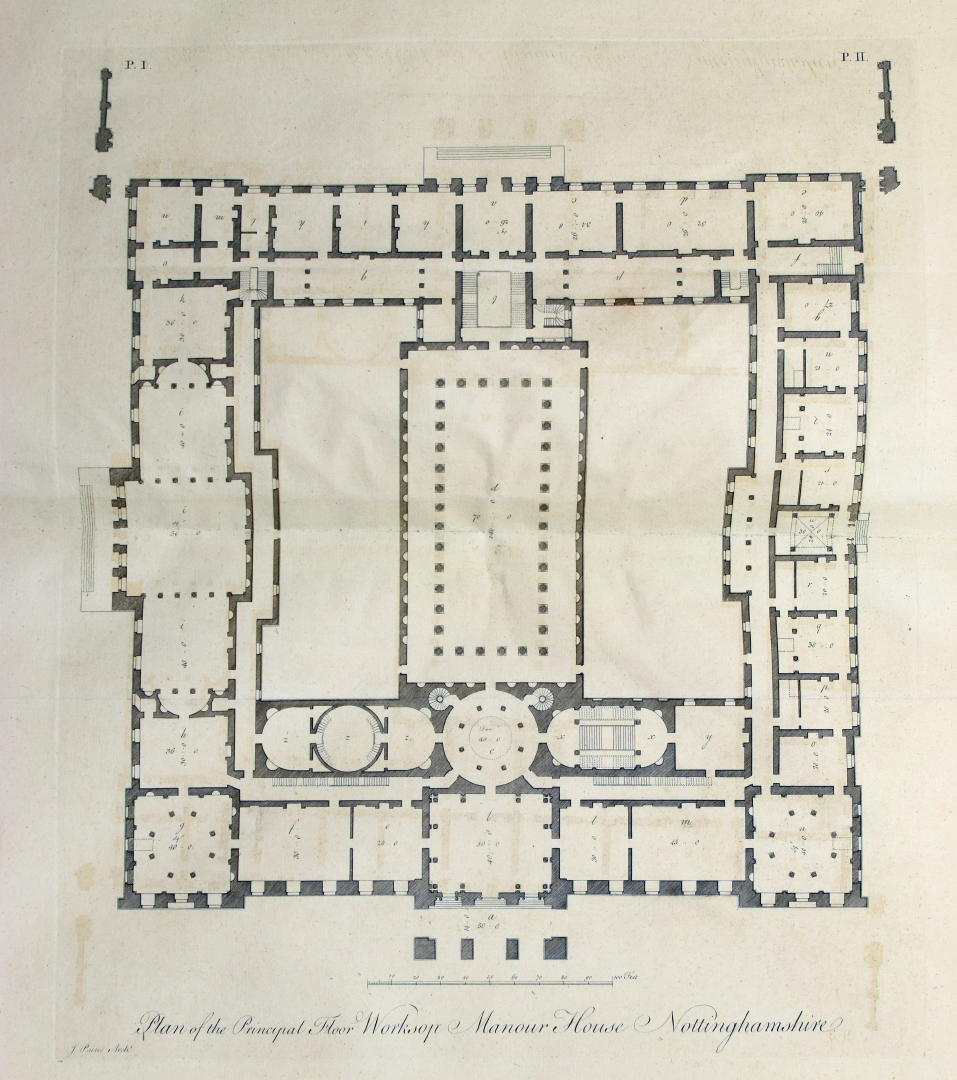
Plan of the principal floor

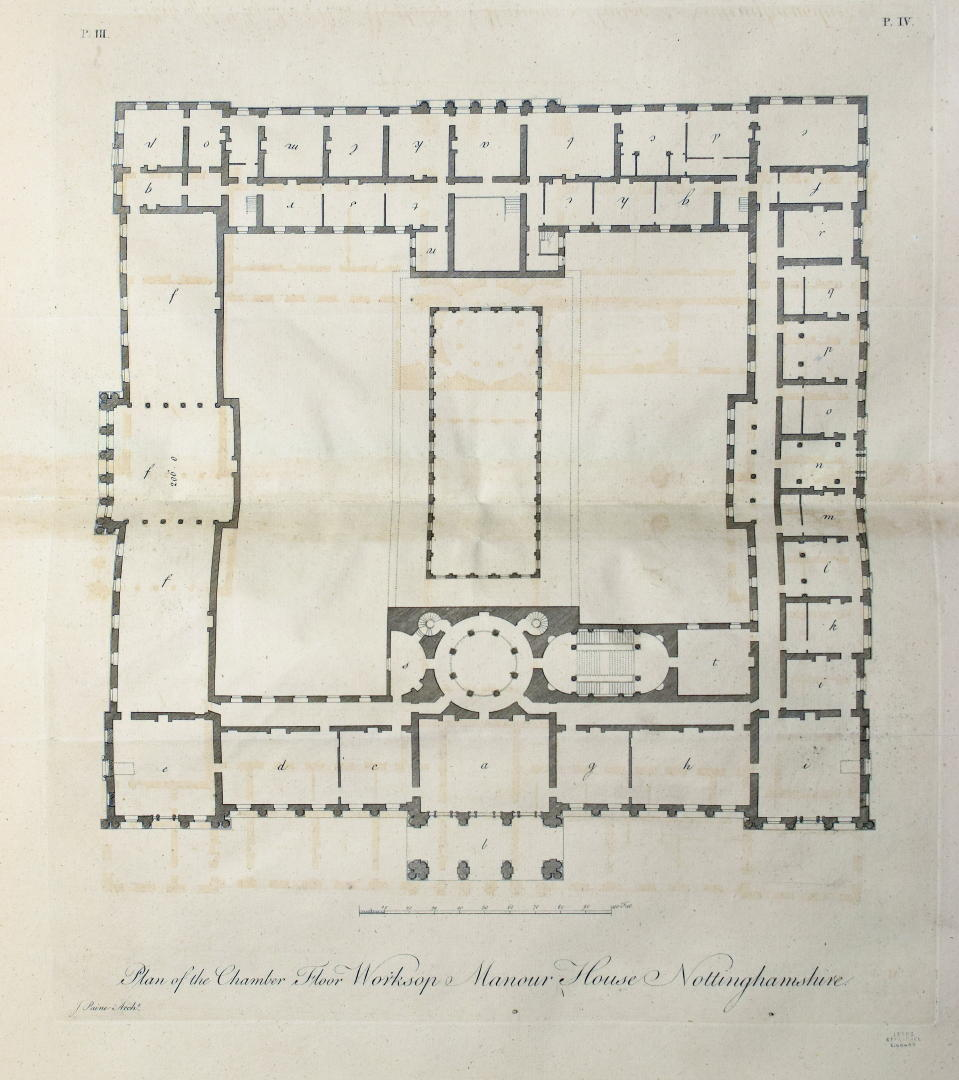
Plan of the chamber floor

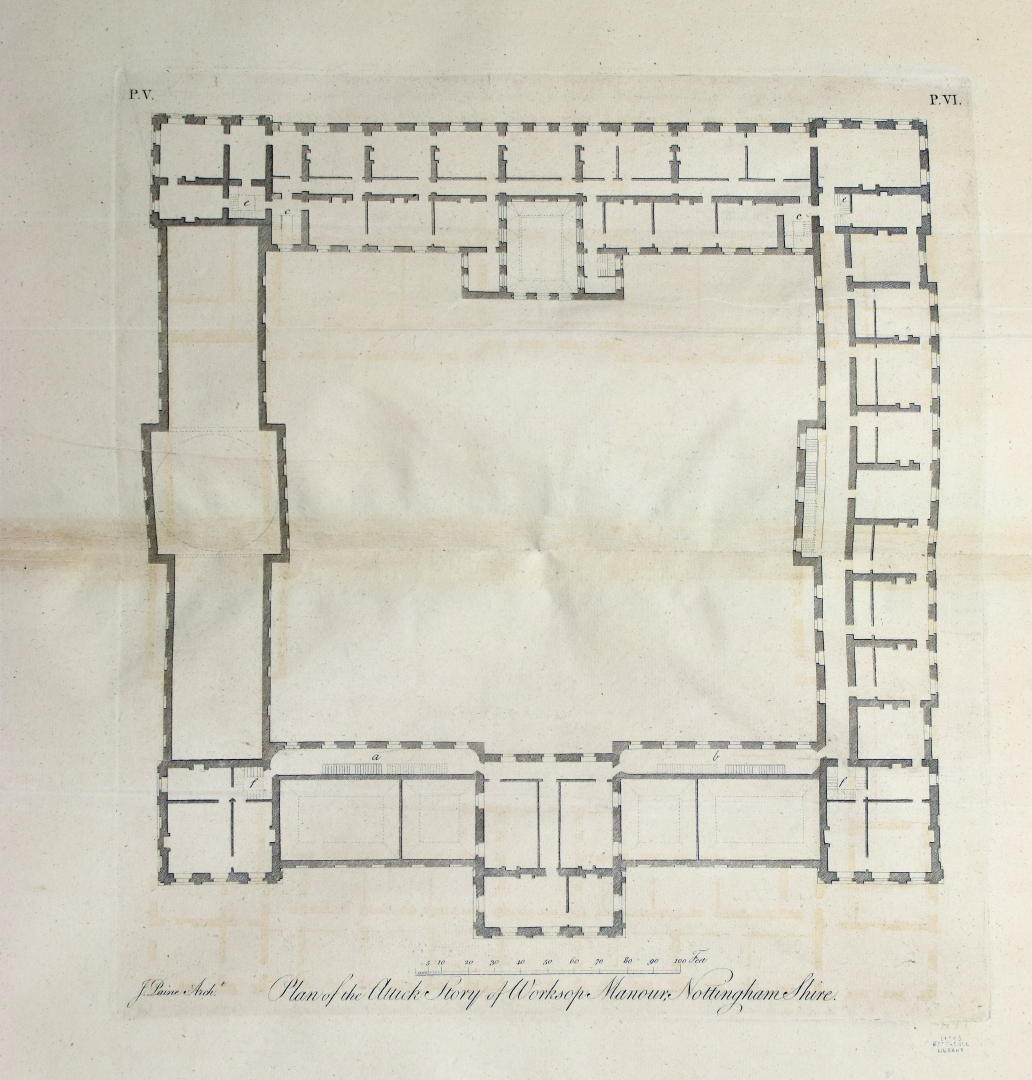
Plan of the upper floor

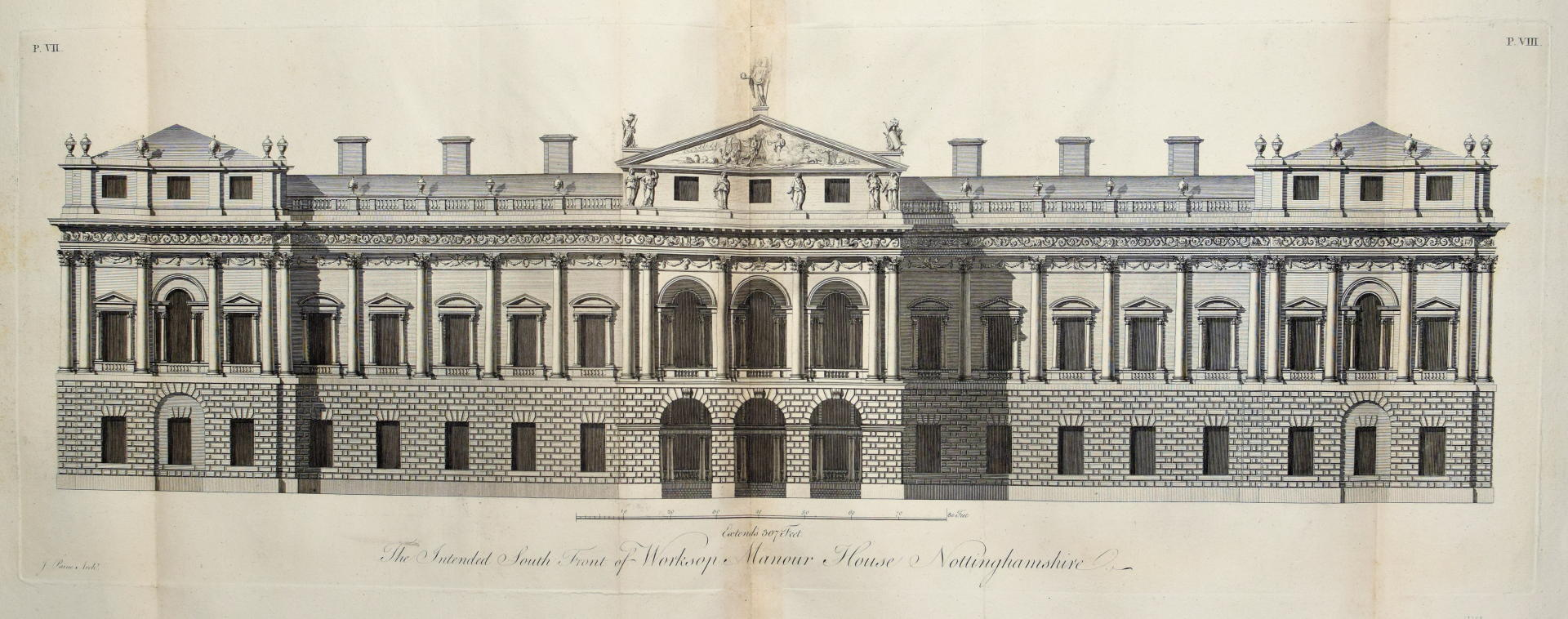
The intended South Front

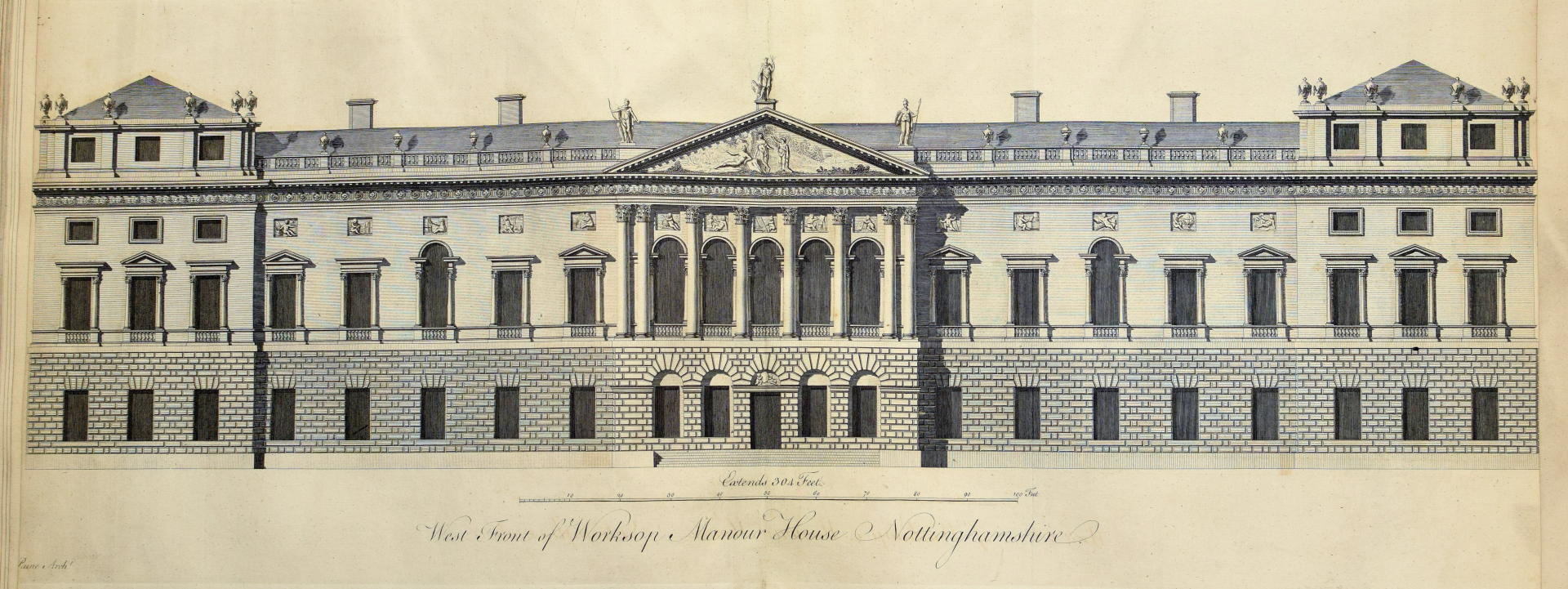
The West Front

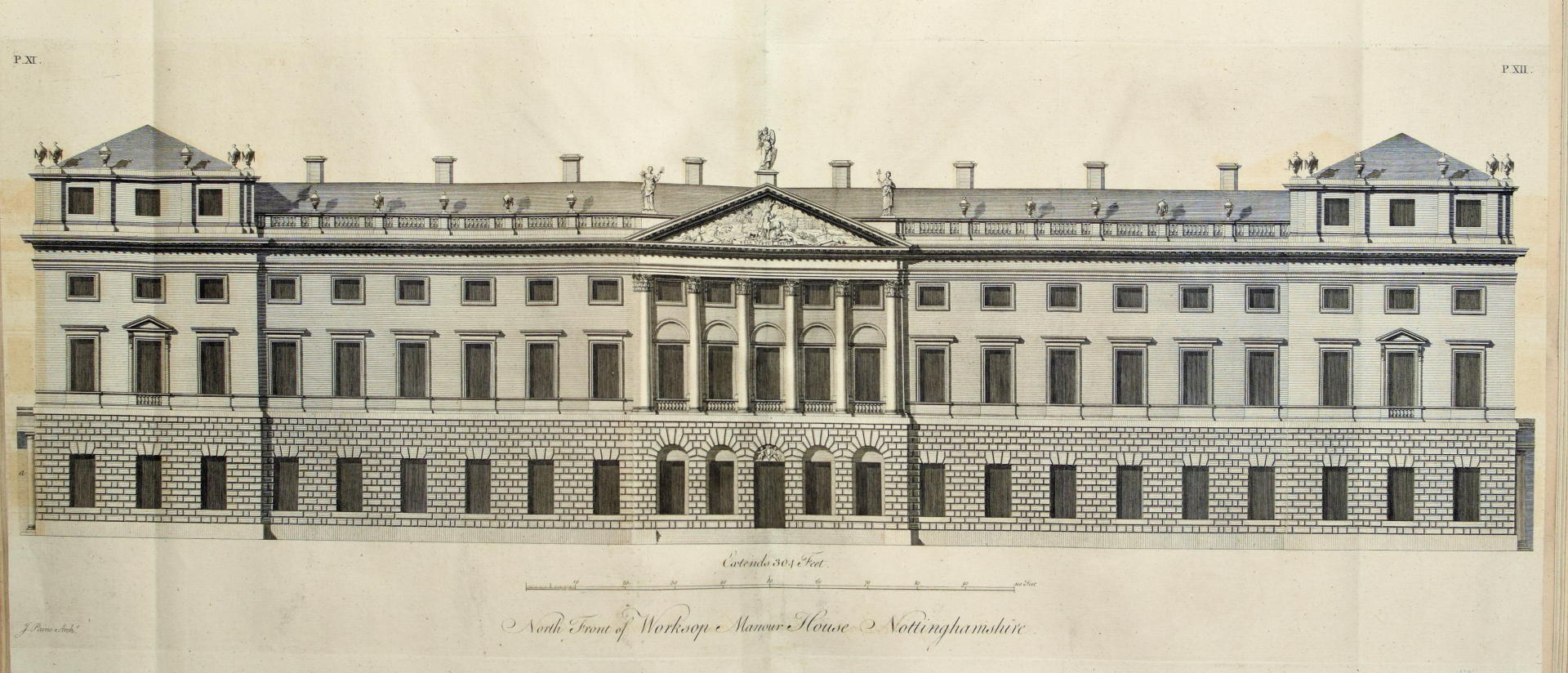
The North Front

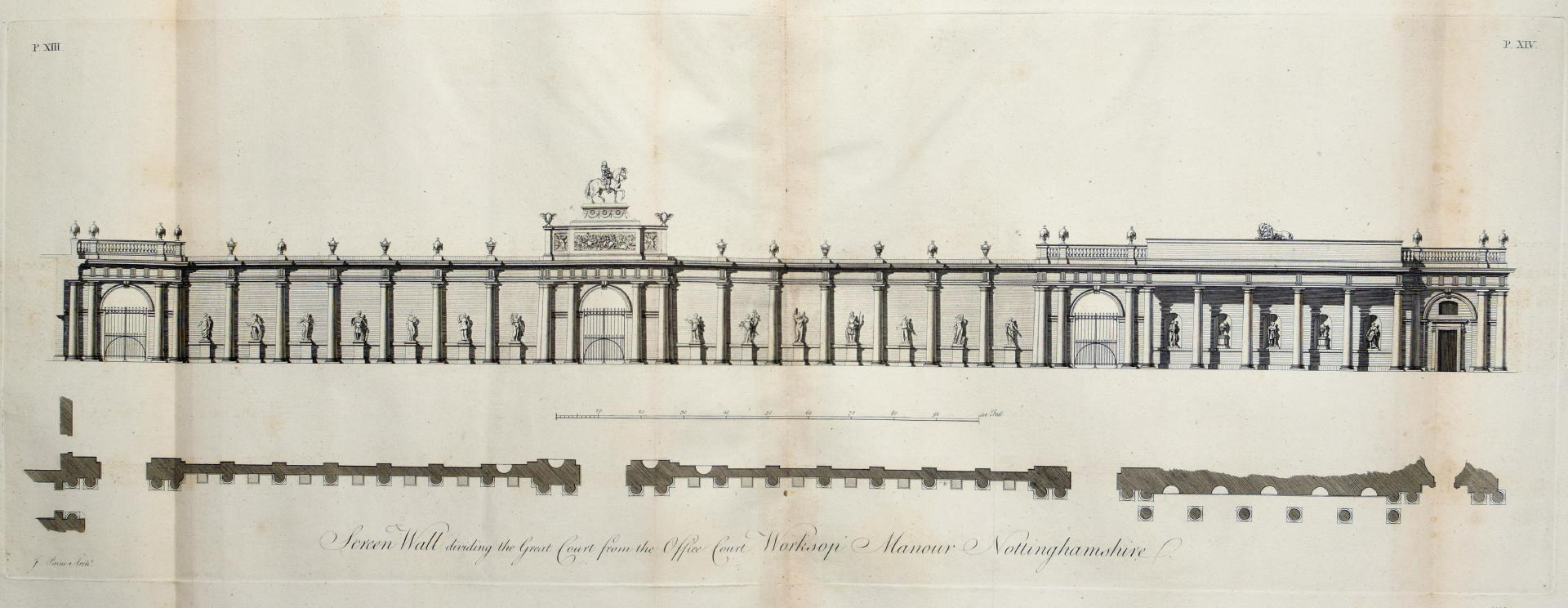
The Wall dividing the Great Court from the Office Court

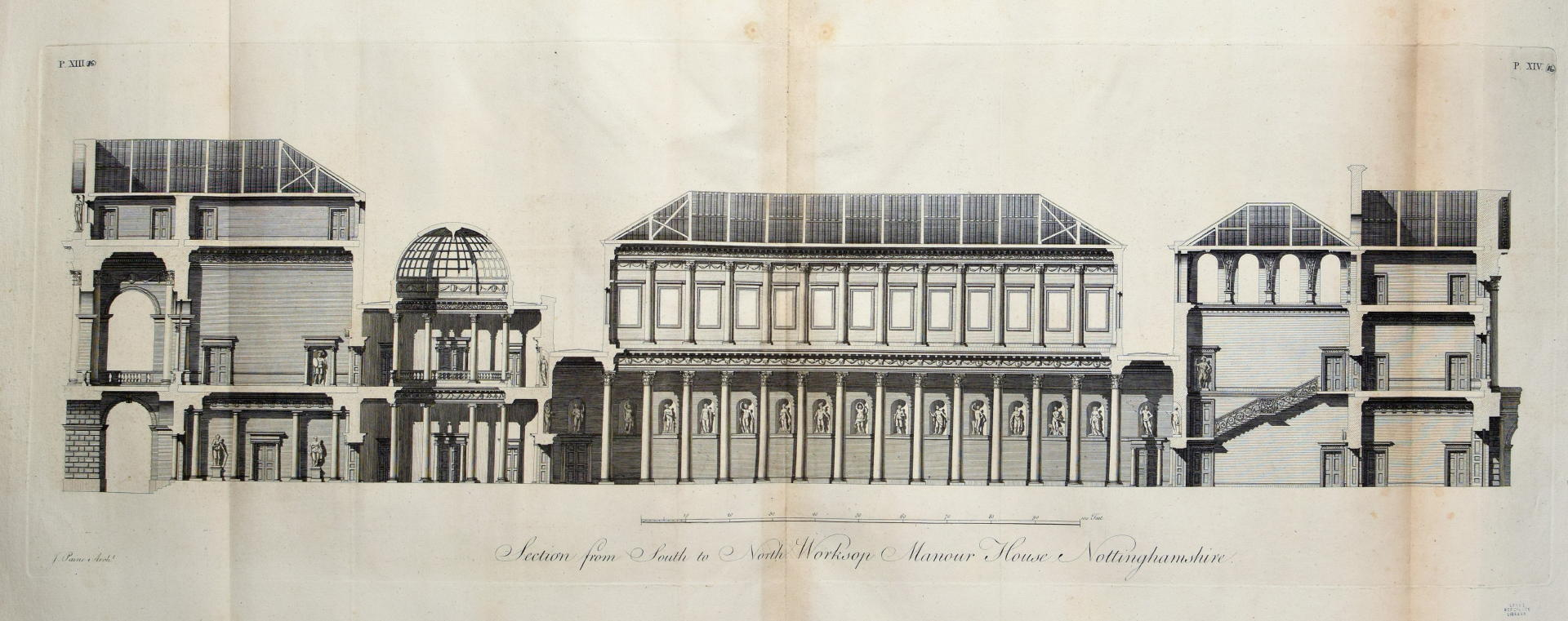
Cross Section from South to North

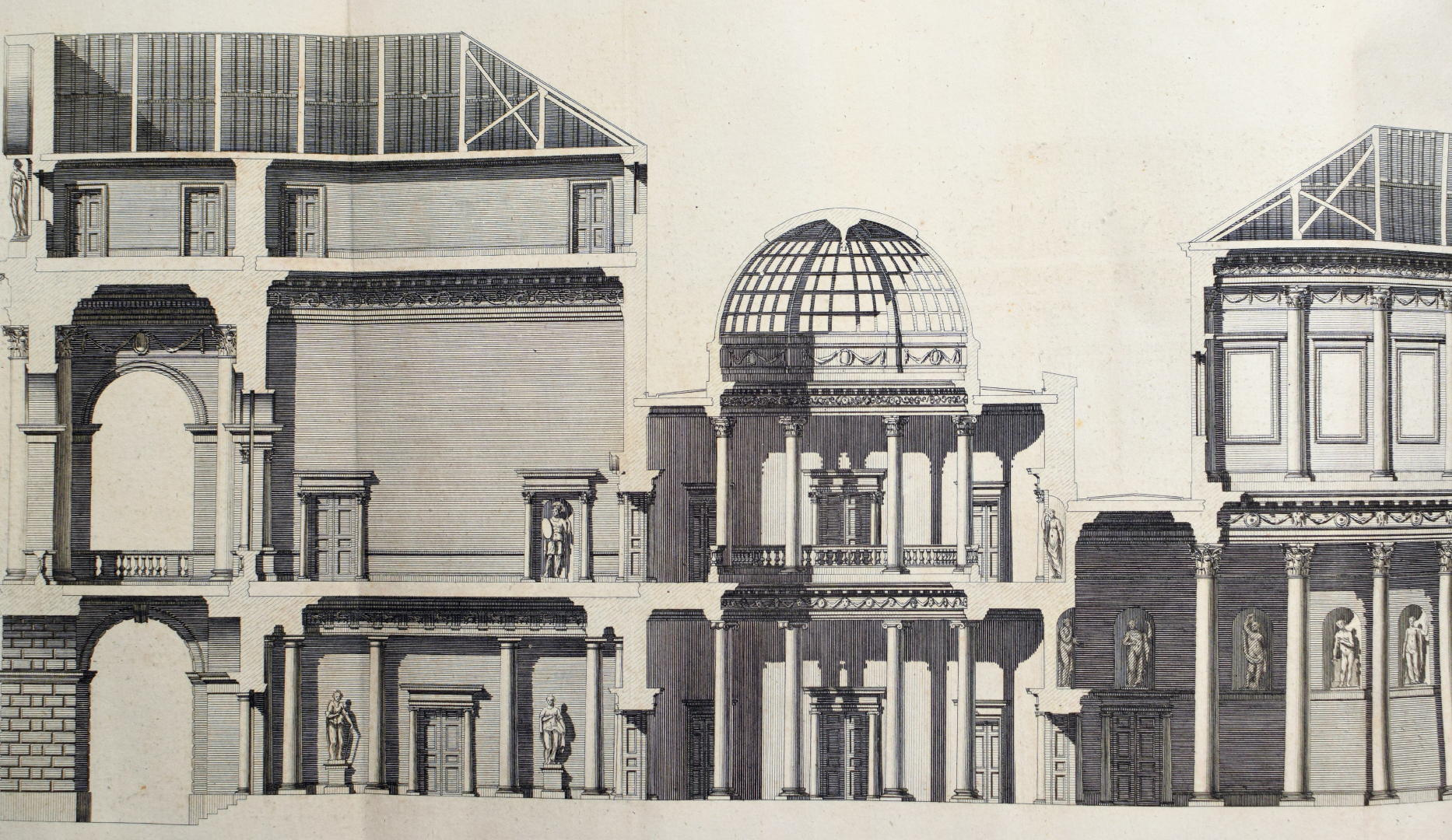
Cross Section South

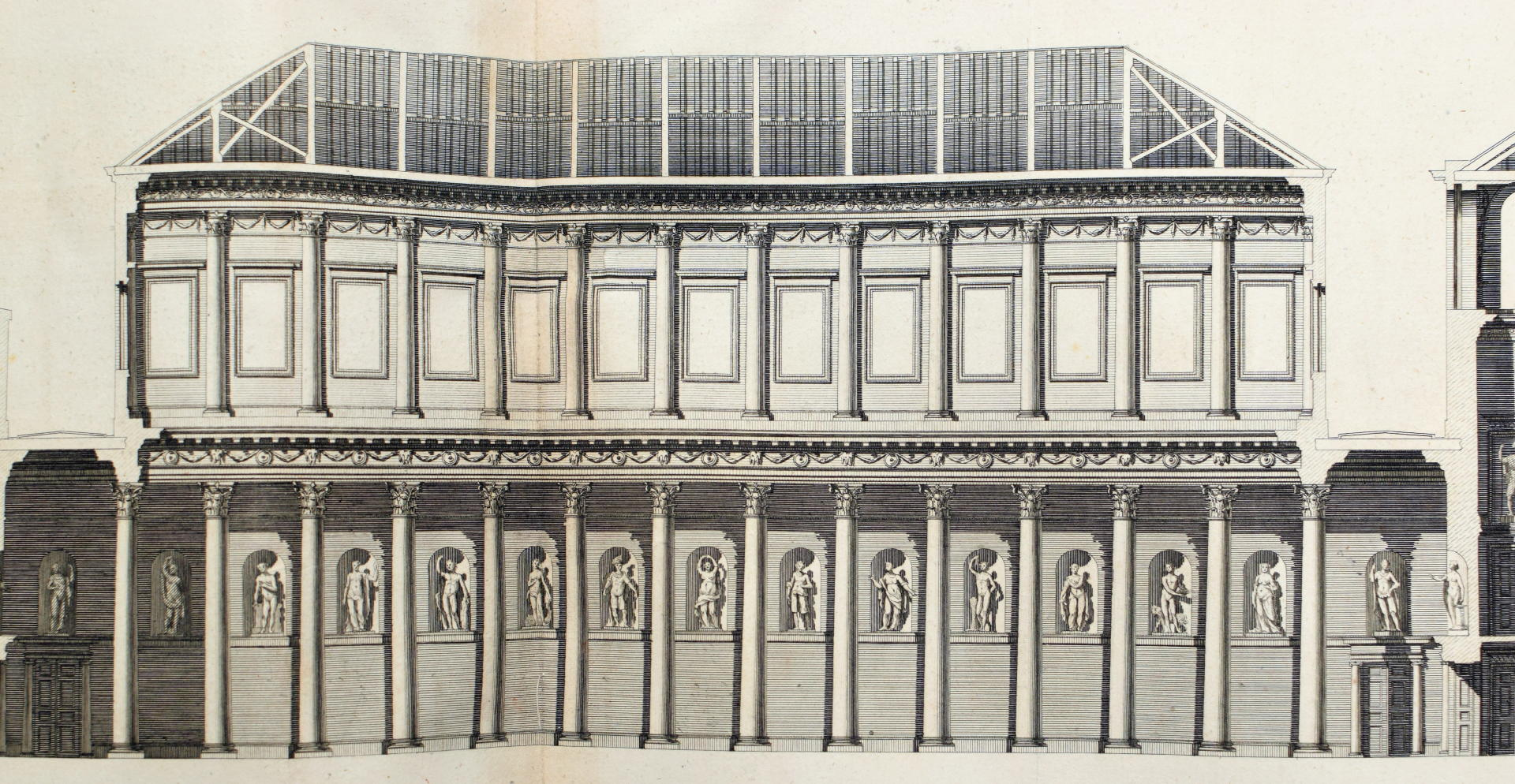
Cross Section of the Greek Hall

=== Neglect and Decline (1777 – 1838) ===
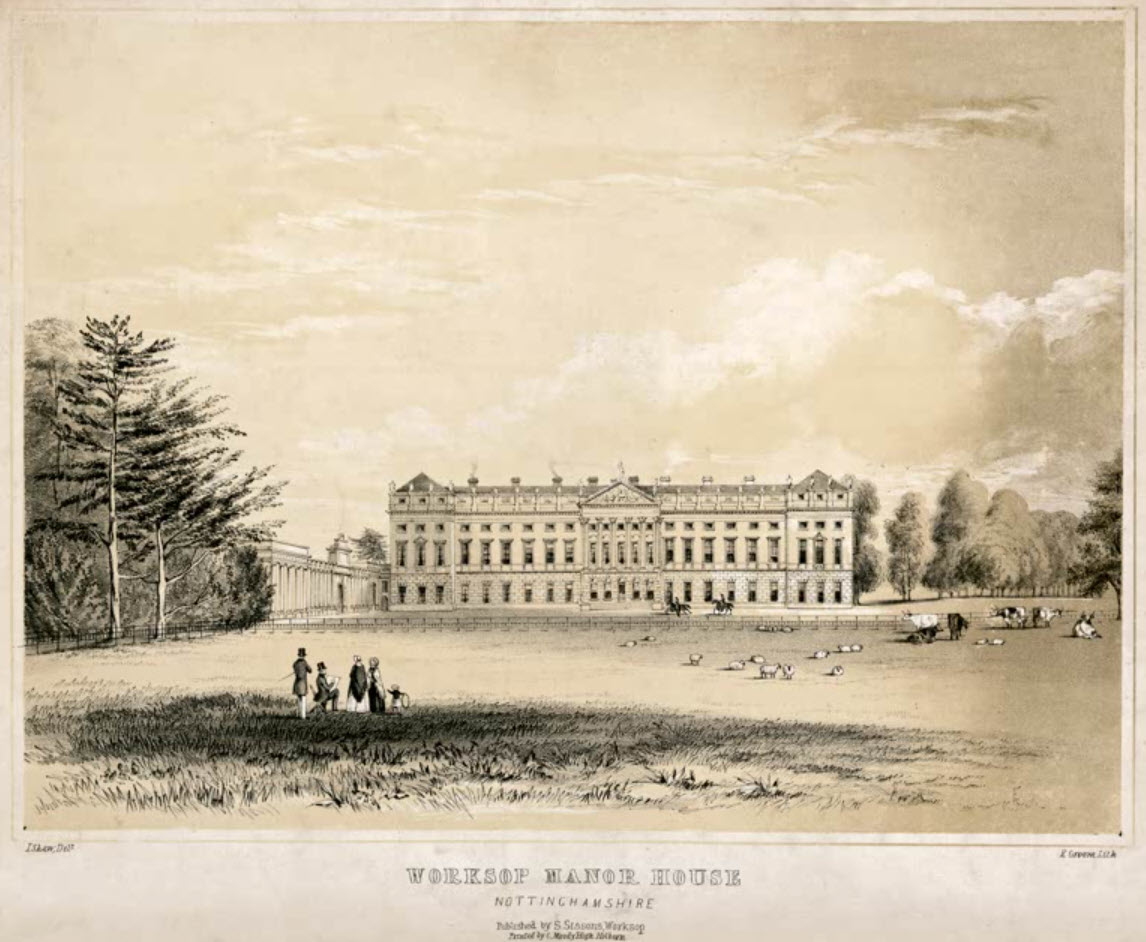
A 19th century depiction of Worksop Manor

On the death of the 9th Duke, the estate passed to a distant cousin, Charles Howard, 10th Duke of Norfolk, then aged 57 and residing in Surrey. Neither he nor his immediate successors chose to live at Worksop, and the great unfinished shell fell into neglect. Bernard Howard, 12th Duke of Norfolk eventually made it over to his son, the Earl of Surrey, in 1815.

=== Sale to the Duke of Newcastle and Demolition (1838–1840) ===
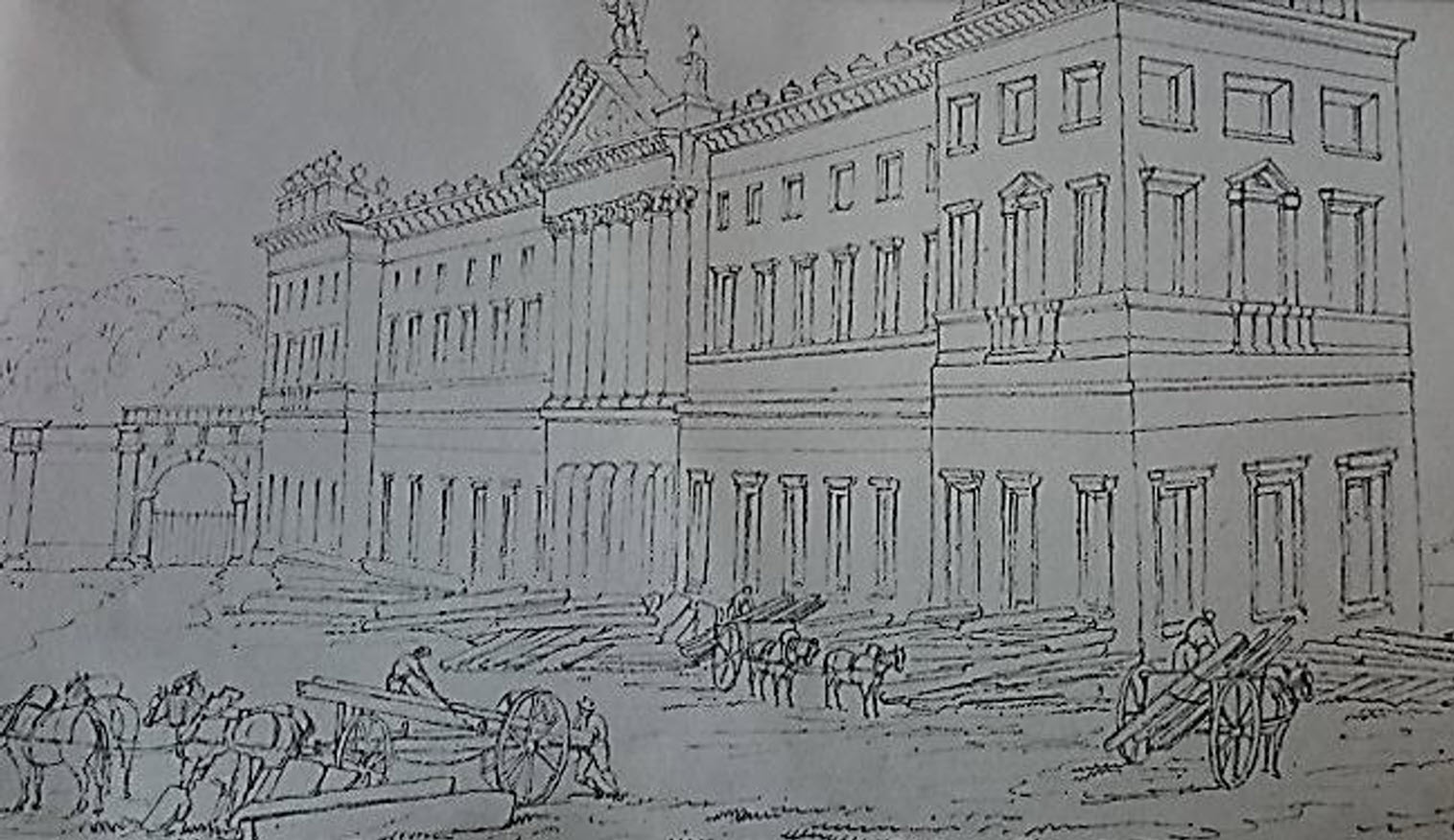
Timber being removed from the Paine house

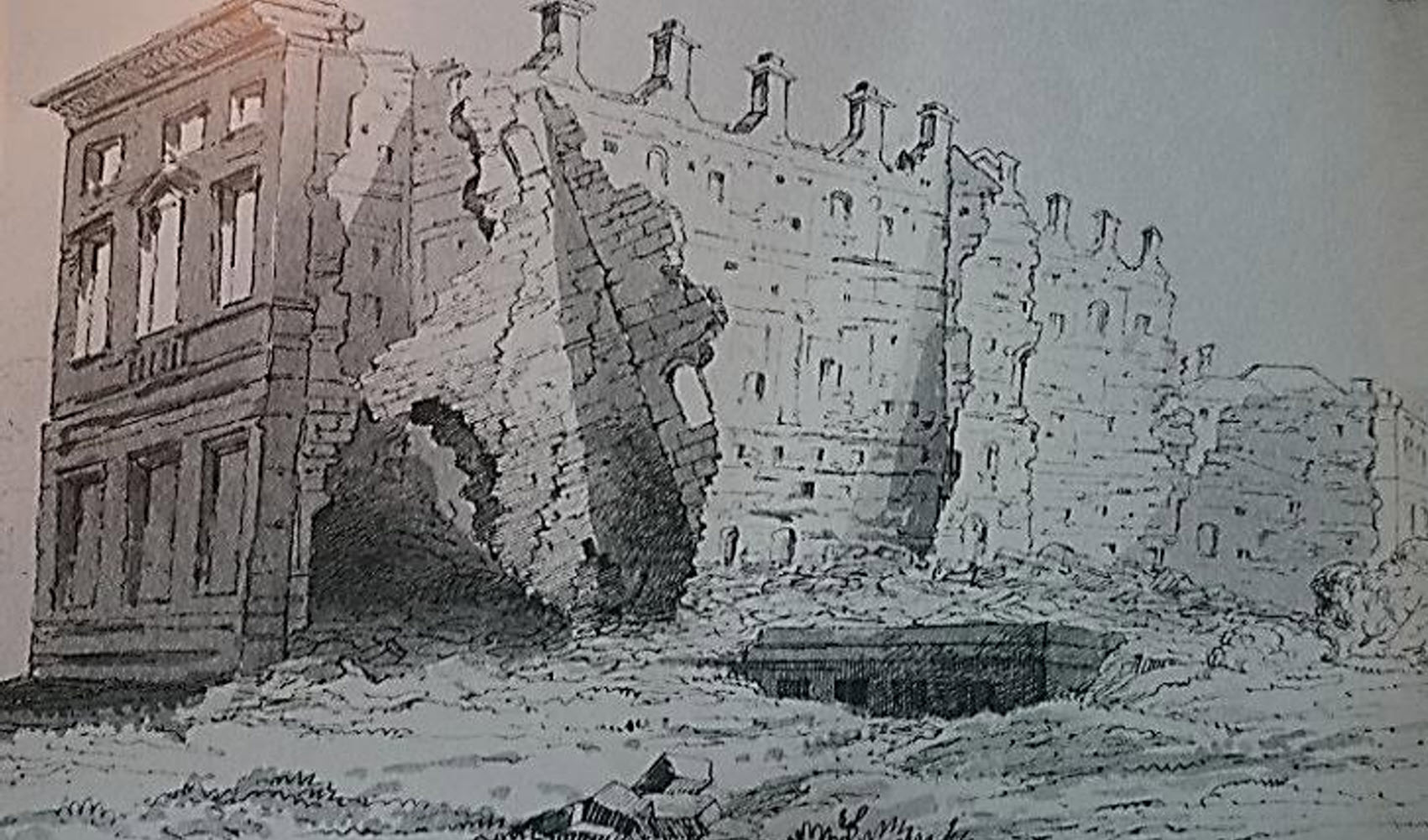
The house in ruins

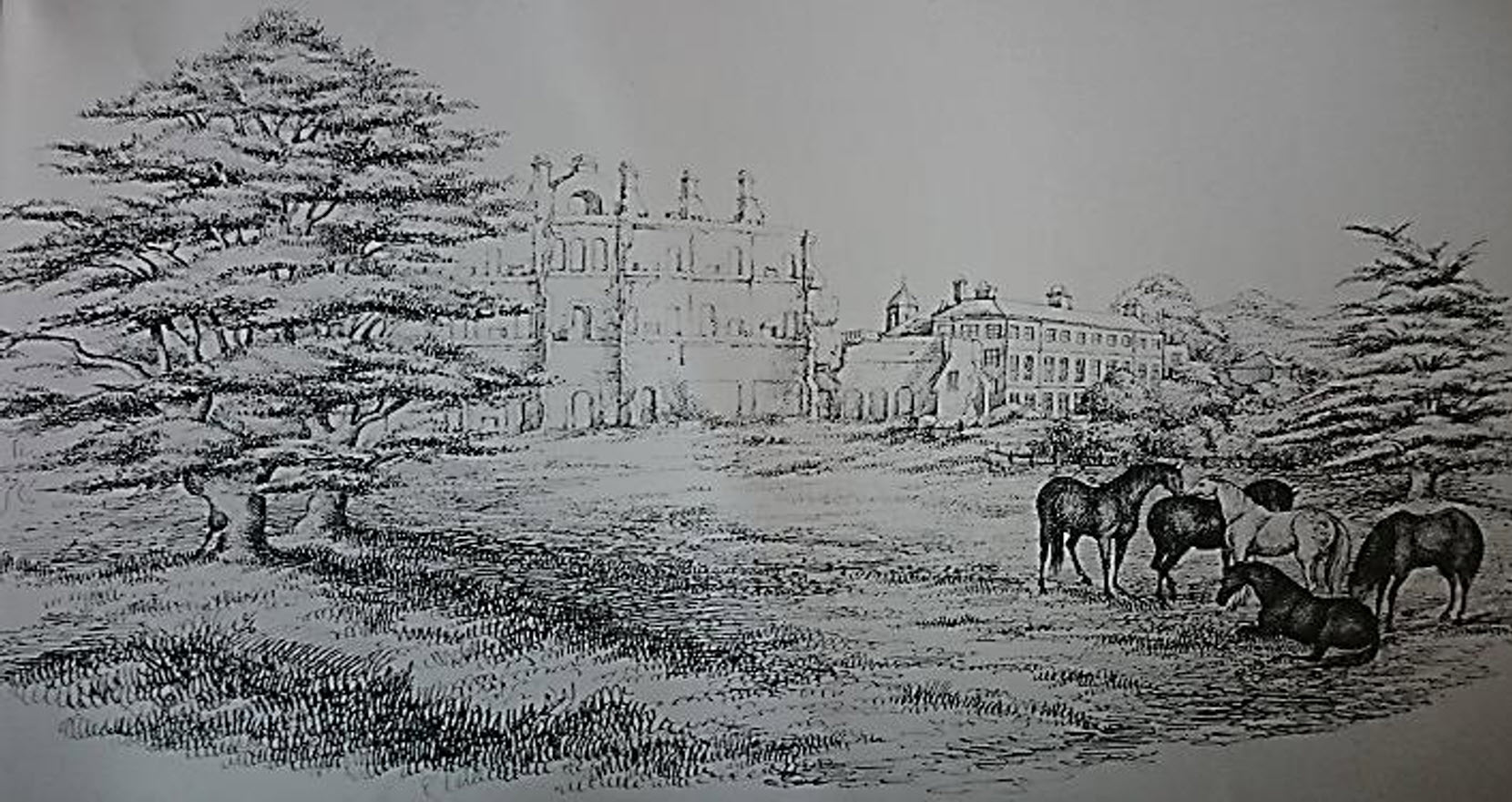
The house in ruins and the service wing to the right

In 1838, the Earl of Surrey sold the estate to Henry Pelham-Clinton, 4th Duke of Newcastle — owner of the neighbouring Clumber Park — for the sum of £375,000. The Duke had no interest in the house itself; his purpose was to absorb the land into his own holdings. He proceeded to strip the building ruthlessly, selling off the roof lead and various fittings before demolishing the main wing with gunpowder. Despite the considerable sums raised through salvage and timber, he made a substantial financial loss on the transaction — a ruinous outcome that appears to have been driven at least in part by anti-Catholic sentiment towards the Duke of Norfolk, who was one of the leading Roman Catholic aristocrats in England.

The surviving portions — the stable block, the service wing, and part of the eastern end of the principal range — were subsequently reformed into a new, reduced mansion. This was leased for a number of years to Lord Foley, and afterwards to William Isaac Cookson, a manufacturer of lead.

=== Later Ownership and the Stud Farm ===
In 1890, a large part of the estate was sold at auction; the house and adjoining parkland were acquired by Sir John Robinson, a Nottingham businessman, who felled many of the mature trees. The property passed in 1929 to his great-nephew Captain John Farr, whose descendants continue to own and manage the estate. Since at least 1890, Worksop Manor has been home to the Worksop Manor Stud, which breeds thoroughbred horses.

=== What Remains ===
The present building represents the surviving service and stable ranges of Paine's unfinished house, remodelled into a country house in the nineteenth century. The carved pediment by William Collins survives on the grounds. Nothing remains above ground of the Smythson house; of Paine's projected quadrangle, only one wing was completed, and that too was largely demolished in the 1840s. The estate is working farmland, home to the Worksop Manor Stud, and bordered by woodland on the edge of the former Sherwood Forest.

== The Coronation Glove — An Ancient Feudal Privilege ==
One of the manor's most singular distinctions is its ancient ceremonial role at the Coronation of the British monarch. The Lords of the Manor of Worksop hold their tenure by grand serjeanty, an obligation to present the monarch with a pair of white gloves and to support the sovereign's right arm whilst they bear the sceptre. This privilege, of great antiquity — said to date back at least to the time of King Alfred — was exercised at the coronations of George III, George IV, William IV, and Queen Victoria by the Dukes of Norfolk, and subsequently by the Dukes of Newcastle. At the coronation of Charles III in 2023, the Lord of Worksop Manor's claim to perform the duty was duly submitted, though ultimately Lord Singh of Wimbledon was chosen to present the glove on behalf of a scaled-back ceremony.

== See also ==
- Grade I listed buildings in Nottinghamshire
- Listed buildings in Worksop
