= Manor of Worksop =

Feudal entity in Nottinghamshire, England

The Manor of Worksop is a feudal entity in the Dukeries area of Nottinghamshire, England. Held in grand serjeanty by a lord of the manor, it was originally connected with nearby Worksop Manor, a stately home.

== History ==
Under the feudal system in late and high medieval England, tenure by serjeanty was a form of land-holding in return for some specified service, usually the discharge of duties in the household of the king or other high-ranking noble. Allegedly created to commemorate the Danegeld (c. 1163), it is said that the Worksop serjeanty was already known in the time of King Alfred if not earlier. In 1327 tenure was passed to Worksop Manor from Farnham Royal, Buckinghamshire. In 1541 Worksop Manor was held by George Talbot, 6th Earl of Shrewsbury, before passing to the Dukes of Norfolk, in whose family it remained until 1840. The estate was then sold to the Dukes of Newcastle of nearby Clumber Park who owned it until the 20th century. The land and the lordship then passed to corporate owners. In 1994 the title was bought by John Hunt (died 2016), a retired transport manager of Worksop, for a reported £40,000.The title then passed to his grandson Robert Beaumont.

== Privileges ==
The lords of the manor of Worksop traditionally belong to the people involved in coronations of the British monarch. Holding the serjeanty requires the lord of the manor of Worksop to render to the Sovereign a pair of white gloves, and also to support their right arm while carrying the sceptre.

== Lords of the manor since 1761 ==
Lords of the manor at coronations since 1761

- 1761 (coronation of George III): The 2nd Marquess of Rockingham (acting as deputy to the 9th Duke of Norfolk)
- 1821 (coronation of George IV): The 12th Duke of Norfolk
- 1831 (coronation of William IV): The 12th Duke of Norfolk
- 1838 (coronation of Victoria): The 12th Duke of Norfolk
- 1902 (coronation of Edward VII): The 7th Duke of Newcastle
- 1911 (coronation of George V): The 7th Duke of Newcastle
- 1937 (coronation of George VI): Earl of Lincoln (acting as deputy to his father, the 8th Duke of Newcastle)
- 1953 (coronation of Elizabeth II): None, as the manor was then under corporate ownership. The Chancellor of the Duchy of Lancaster, the Lord Woolton presented the Glove.
- 2023 (coronation of Charles III): The Lord of Worksop Manor’s claim to perform the duty was submitted to the claims committee, however due to a scaled back coronation and the Palace opting for changes, the Lord Singh of Wimbledon presented the glove.
