= 1904 Gateshead by-election =

UK parliamentary by-election

← 1900	20 January 1904	1906 →

Candidate	Johnson	Morpeth
Party	Liberal	Unionist
Popular vote	8,220	7,015
Percentage	54.0%	46.0%
MP before election
Sir William Allan
Liberal
Subsequent MP
John Johnson
Liberal

The 1904 Gateshead by-election was a Parliamentary by-election held on 20 January 1904. The constituency returned one Member of Parliament (MP) to the House of Commons of the United Kingdom, elected by the first past the post voting system.

== Vacancy ==
Sir William Allan had been Liberal MP for the seat of Gateshead since the 1893 Gateshead by-election. He died on the 28 December 1903 at the age of 66.

== Electoral history ==
Gateshead had returned Liberal candidates at every election since the seat was created in 1832. Since 1886 their only challengers had been Liberal Unionists. Allan's third and final election win in 1900 was his widest;

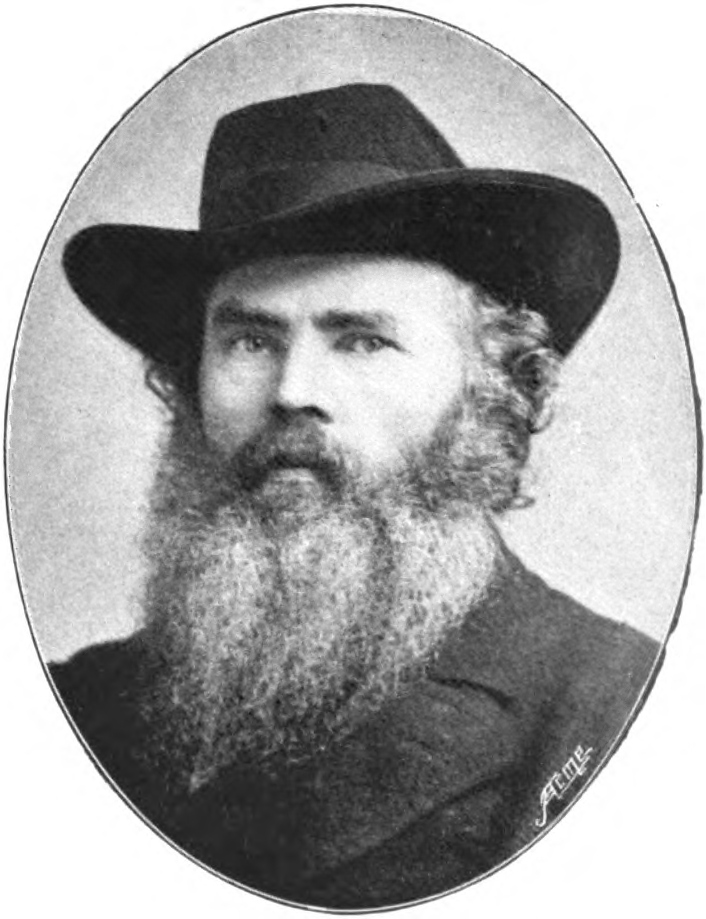
Allan

General election January 1900: Gateshead
Party	Candidate	Votes	%	±%
Liberal	William Allan	6,657	53.8	+1.8
Liberal Unionist	John Sherburn	5,711	46.2	−1.8
Majority		946	7.6	+3.6
Turnout		12,368	74.3	−7.7
Liberal hold		Swing	+1.8	

== Candidates ==
Johnson

- The local Liberal Association selected 54 year-old John Johnson as their candidate to hold the seat. He was Financial Secretary of the Durham Miners' Association and a member of the Independent Labour Party. Educated at a local village school, he had worked as a miner for 30 years. He had also been elected to Durham County Council. His candidacy was a recognition that a predominantly mining constituency should have a miners candidate.

Morpeth

- The local Liberal Unionist Association selected 37 year-old Charles Howard as their candidate. He was the eldest son of the Earl of Carlisle. He was educated at Rugby and Balliol College, Oxford. He joined the British Army, achieved the rank of Captain in the 3rd Border Regiment and served in the Second Boer War. He had contested Chester-le-Street in 1895 and Hexham in 1900.

== Campaign ==
Polling Day was fixed for 20 January 1904, just 23 days after the death of Allan. The campaign was therefore very short.

== Result ==
Despite the fact that this was a January by-election, the voter turn out was well up on the previous election. The Liberals held the seat, slightly increasing their vote share:

Gateshead by-election, 1904
Party	Candidate	Votes	%	±%
Lib-Lab	John Johnson	8,220	54.0	+0.2
Liberal Unionist	Charles Howard	7,015	46.0	−0.2
Majority		1,205	8.0	+0.4
Turnout		15,235	84.9	+10.6
Lib-Lab hold		Swing	+0.2	

== Aftermath ==
In 1904 Morpeth was elected to the House of Commons for Birmingham South, a seat he held until 1911, when he succeeded his father in the earldom and entered the House of Lords. Johnson was re-elected at the 1906 general election:

General election January 1906: Gateshead
Party	Candidate	Votes	%	±%
Lib-Lab	John Johnson	9,651	65.3	+11.3
Liberal Unionist	Theodore Angier	5,126	34.7	−11.3
Majority		4,525	30.6	+22.6
Turnout		14,777	79.4	−5.5
Lib-Lab hold		Swing	+11.3	

Johnson's majority had increased in line with the swing to the Liberals across the country. He continued to take the Liberal whip in the Commons until 1909 when he switched to the Labour Party group.
