= Sarah Melville =

British politician

Sarah, Lady Melville (1884 or 1885 – 19 October 1974) was a British political activist.

Born Sarah Tugander, she met Conservative Party politician Bonar Law in 1907 and became his private secretary. She continued in post until 1916, by which time Bonar Law had served as leader of his party. Despite this, her personal politics were socialist, and she was active in the Fabian Society. In 1916, she married James Melville, and the two soon became founder members of the South Kensington Constituency Labour Party.

Sarah campaigned for her husband in Gateshead at the 1929 UK general election, and he won election. The following year, she was elected to the executive of the Fabian Society. When James died, early in 1931, local Labour Party activists asked her to be the new candidate, but she declined. She spent the remainder of her life in retirement, dying in 1974.
