= Hansen, Schrader & Co. v De Gasperi =

South African legal case

Hansen, Schrader & Co. v De Gasperi is an important case in South African contract law. It was heard by Solomon J in the Witwatersrand High Court from April 15 to 16, 1903.

== Contractual interpretation ==
The case is important primarily for its influence on the interpretation of contracts in South Africa. "The primary purpose of the interpretation of a contract," writes Catherine Maxwell, "is to give effect to the intentions of the parties." The primary rule, therefore, is that effect must be given to the parties' common intention: that is, to what both of them intended on entering into the contract. As Innes J put it in Joubert v Enslin, "The golden rule applicable to the interpretation of all contracts is to ascertain and to follow the intention of the parties."

There is a paradox, however, in that the subjective intentions of the parties must be established with reference to certain objective factors, the most obvious being the words printed on the contract. As Solomon puts it in his judgment,

It is not for this Court to speculate as to what the intentions of the parties were when they entered into the contract. That must be gathered from their language, and it is the duty of the Court as far as possible to give to the language used by the parties its ordinary grammatical meaning.

In determining the common intention of the parties, then, the courts must consider first the literal and ordinary meaning of the words in the contract. Hence Innes J continues, in Joubert v Enslin, "If the contract itself, or any evidence admissible under the circumstances, affords a definite indication of the meaning of the contracting parties, then it seems to me that a court should always give effect to that meaning."

The Court in Hansen was not concerned, per se, with determining exactly the intention of the parties; its goal was to determine whether or not that intention was clearly reflected in the contractual document, from the literal and ordinary meaning of the language.
