= Deckham =

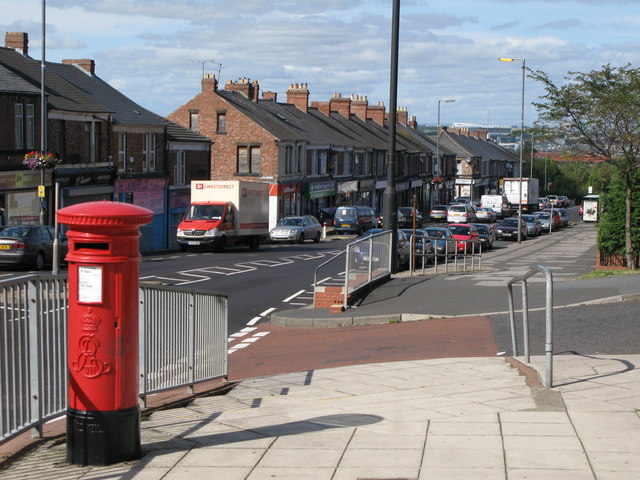
- Old Durham Road, Deckham

- Location within Tyne and Wear
- Population: 9,938
- OS grid reference: NZ2661
- Metropolitan borough: Gateshead
- Metropolitan county: Tyne and Wear
- Region: North East
- Country: England
- Sovereign state: United Kingdom
- Post town: GATESHEAD
- Postcode district: NE8
- Dialling code: 0191
- Police: Northumbria
- Fire: Tyne and Wear
- Ambulance: North East
- UK Parliament: Gateshead Central and Whickham

Deckham is a residential suburb in the Metropolitan Borough of Gateshead in Tyne and Wear, England. It is bordered by Gateshead town centre to the north, Sheriff Hill to the south, Felling and Carr Hill to the east and Shipcote to the west. It lies on the B1296, the route of the old Great North Road, 1 mile (1.6 km) south of Gateshead town centre, 1.5 miles (2.4 km) south of Newcastle-upon-Tyne and 13 miles (21 km) north of the city of Durham. In 2011, Deckham had a population of 9,938.

Deckham's history is sparsely documented but suggests that the settlement was established at the junction of Carr Hill Road and the Old Durham Road in the early 19th century alongside the estate of Deckham Hall, built several centuries earlier and inhabited at one time by Thomas Deckham. The village grew, and at the turn of the 20th century was enveloped by urban spawl when neighbouring Gateshead absorbed its outlying villages and settlements. Deckham is largely distinguished from other areas by a commercial area on Old Durham Road which is the principal route through the suburb. Historically, Deckham was a village in County Durham and was incorporated into the Metropolitan Borough of Gateshead by the Local Government Act 1972.

Deckham has steep topography which has shaped the character of the suburb. Residents can enjoy striking views towards Newcastle upon Tyne and across the Team Valley. The settlement is governed locally by a Parliamentary Labour council and elects a Labour MP.

Deckham is an area of social and economic deprivation, in the top ten per cent of such areas according to the Index of Multiple Deprivation. Housing stock is predominantly council housing and is, in many places, outdated and in need of modernisation. Whilst once the site of a coal mine, there is today no major employer in Deckham, which is considered a residential suburb of Gateshead. The main economic activity is in a commercial development on Old Durham Road. Deckham has a number of public houses, one of which, the Plough Inn, is more than 150 years old. The only education provision is at South Street primary school, which is a good school according to OFSTED. There are two churches, one of which, the Church of St George, is a Grade II listed building, and community facilities are provided by Gateshead Older People's Assembly and the Elgin Centre in Carr Hill.

== History ==
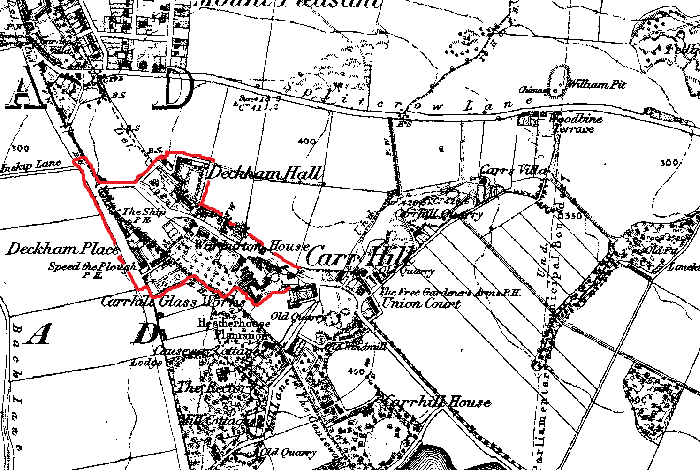
An 1895 Ordnance Survey Map of the early Deckham settlement (marked in red) on which Deckhall Hall and the two public houses are clearly evidenced

Unlike Sheriff Hill, Carr Hill and Low Fell, Deckham's history is sparsely recorded. It indicates that, by the middle of the 19th century, there was a small settlement which was part of Gateshead Fell; a wild and treacherous area of common land notable for the criminality of the tinkers and hawkers who lived there. Ordnance survey mapping illustrates the sparsity of buildings in 1860; the area contained little except Deckham Hall, a few other dwellings and two public houses at the point where the old turnpike road (Note: Now Old Durham Road. The route of the B1296 Old Durham Road is exactly the same as the old turnpike road which ran through Gateshead Fell and which linked Durham to Newcastle-upon-Tyne (see Manders, 1973: 308)) branched off towards Carr's Hill. The two public houses were the 'Speed the Plough' and 'The Ship'.

The Deckham Hall estate was on the east side of Old Durham Road, 1.25 miles from the Tyne Bridge. It is evidenced in 1614 and belonged to Thomas Deckham, who died the same year and bequeathed it to his granddaughter with "three pounds for the bringing home of water" to the poor people of the area. It changed hands regularly between the families Wooler, James and Bowker, in the centuries after Deckham's death and varied in size whilst doing so. Alderman Benjamin Biggar, Mayor of Gateshead 1861–2, is thought to have lived at Deckham Hall.

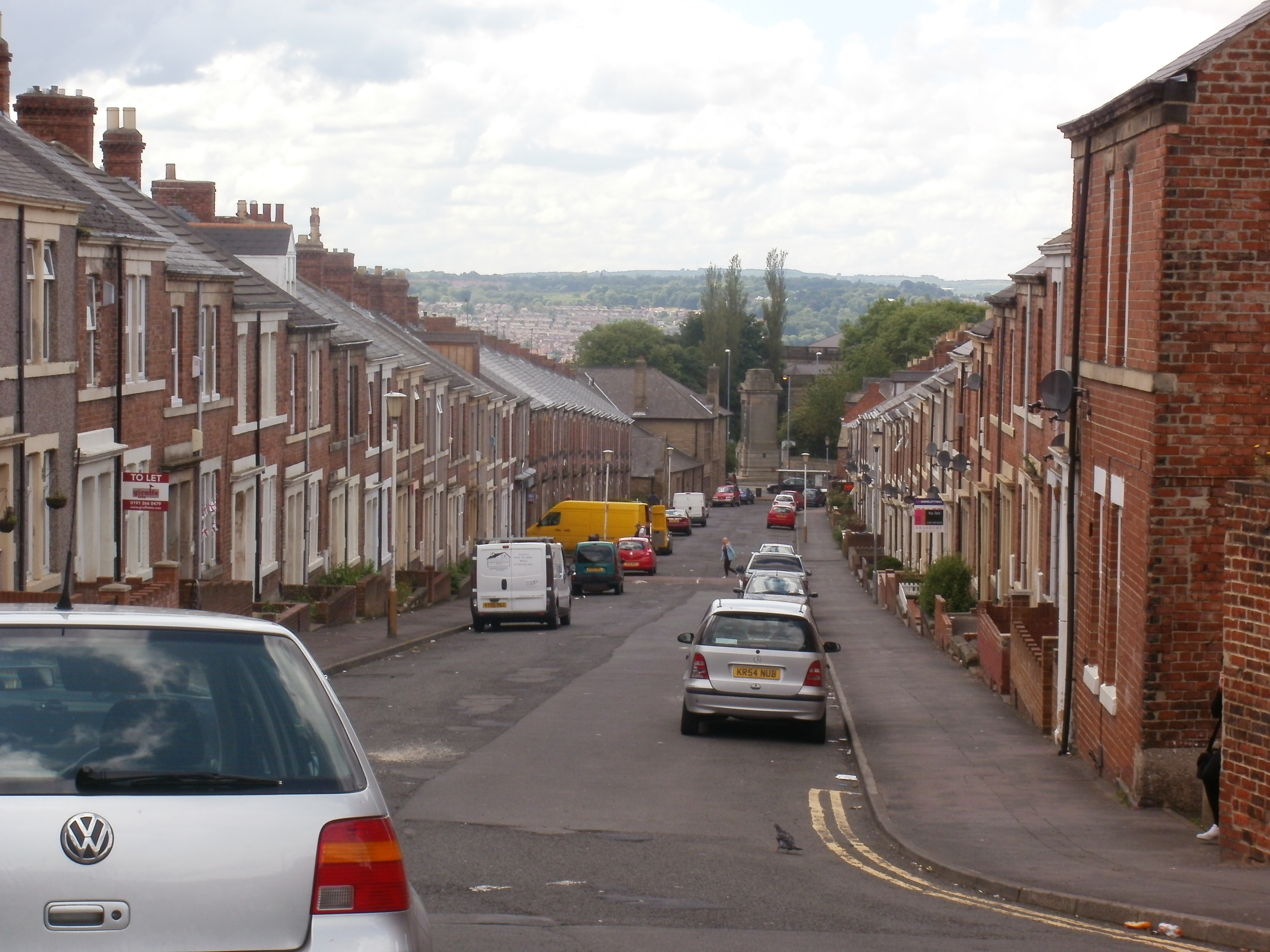
The 19th-century Tyneside flats in Northborne Street

By the turn of the 20th century Deckham's rural aspect had changed. Whilst there remained large areas of grass and woodland between Deckham and Gateshead, there was a period of extensive building; several dozen dwellings were erected by 1895 in the Mount Pleasant area as Gateshead expanded southwards. A public house was built at the junction of Taylor Terrace and Split Crow Road. Two years later, a tract of Tyneside flats was built on the west side of the Old Durham Road and many streets in the area, such as Chandos Street, Shipcote Terrace, Raby Street and Northborne Street, are evidenced, along with an unnamed school. By 1919, some rural scenes could still be enjoyed but the fields were "rapidly encroached upon" in the 1920s and 1930s and replaced with more terraced housing at Caris Street, Fullerton Place and Methuen Street and large tracts of council houses. By this time, Deckham Hall was in a state of disrepair and was notable to residents for its resemblance to a haunted house "because of its air of gloom and the strange echoes to be heard on windy nights". The hall was demolished in 1930 and more council houses were erected on the site.

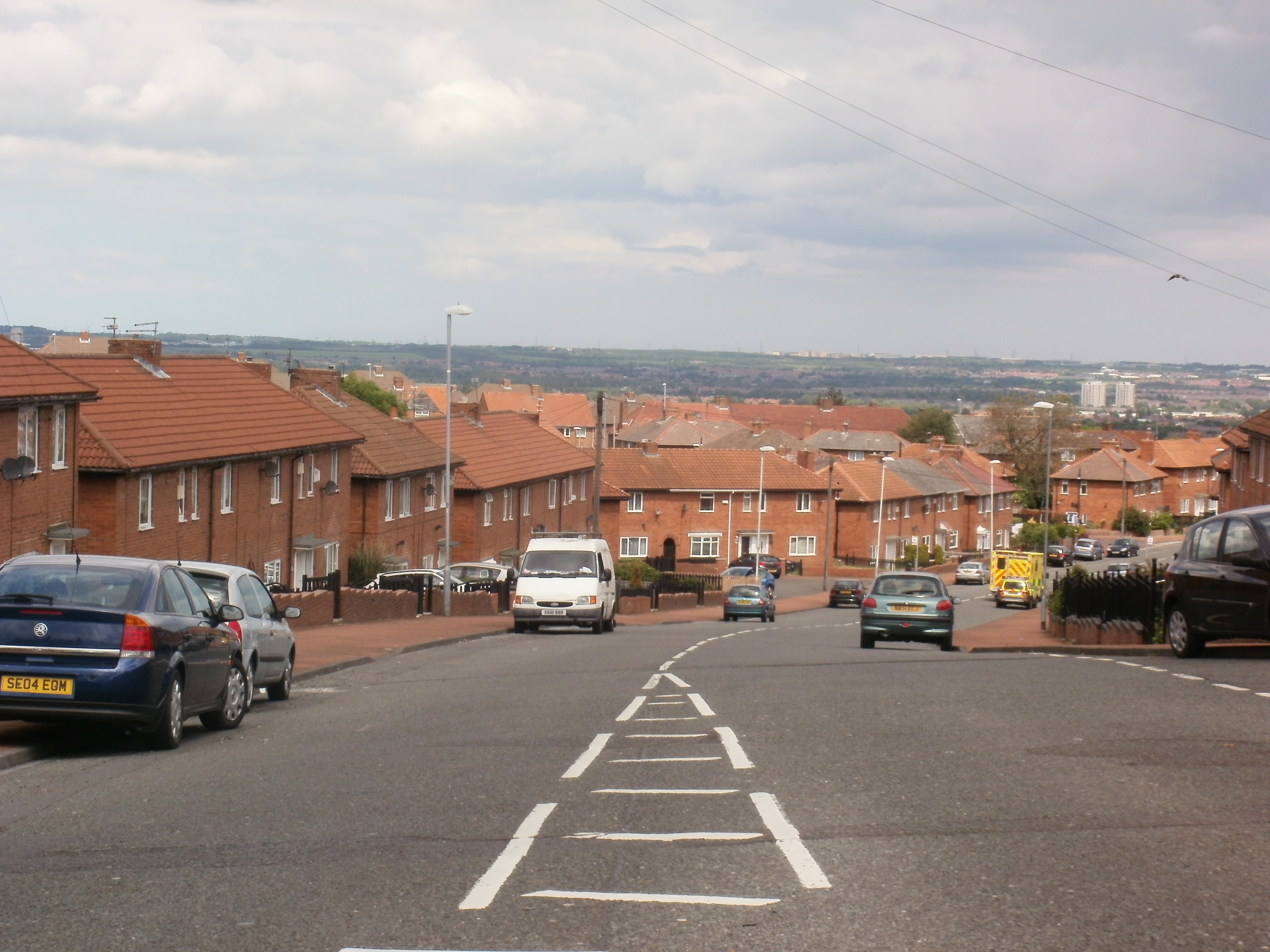
Hendon Road

Since the intensive period of house building, little has changed. At the west end of the suburb, the Tyneside flats at Northborne Street and surrounding streets remain in situ and here there is "housing and little else". Much of this housing is in poor condition, some is in "crumbling disrepair" and requires substantial investment. Old Durham Road has developed into the focal point of the neighbourhood and is the sole commercial area, with small, independent shops running along the western end of the road backing onto the streets from Inskip Terrace and Shipcote Terrace. Whilst many retail units are in a state of deterioration, and despite a report describing recent housing development on the east side of Old Durham Road as "poorly handled and unsightly", the area remains "interesting and lively". By contrast, the central and eastern areas of Deckham are affected by a more marked decline. At the western edge there are stone remnants of an old, rural settlement, but the remainder, grouped around Edgeware and Kingston Roads, consists of bland, repetitive social housing arranged on long, curved streets which combine to create an environment which is anonymous, claustrophobic and disorientating. One source describes the environment as one where "eyesores become landmarks (lock–up workshops on Kingston Road), any slight change in materials becomes significant (system–built housing on Kingston Road), and any attempt to do something different becomes a relief (a corner garden on Mayfair Gardens)".

The net result is that, in Deckham today:

There is something of a sense of isolation in parts of Deckham, especially further up the hill as development densities drop, commercial and social facilities disappear and activity levels on the street fall away. Around the Old Durham Road the surviving mix of small shops and meeting places generate some impression of communal spirit, but the poor condition of many properties and the dominance of the public realm by traffic serve to stunt it.

== Economy ==
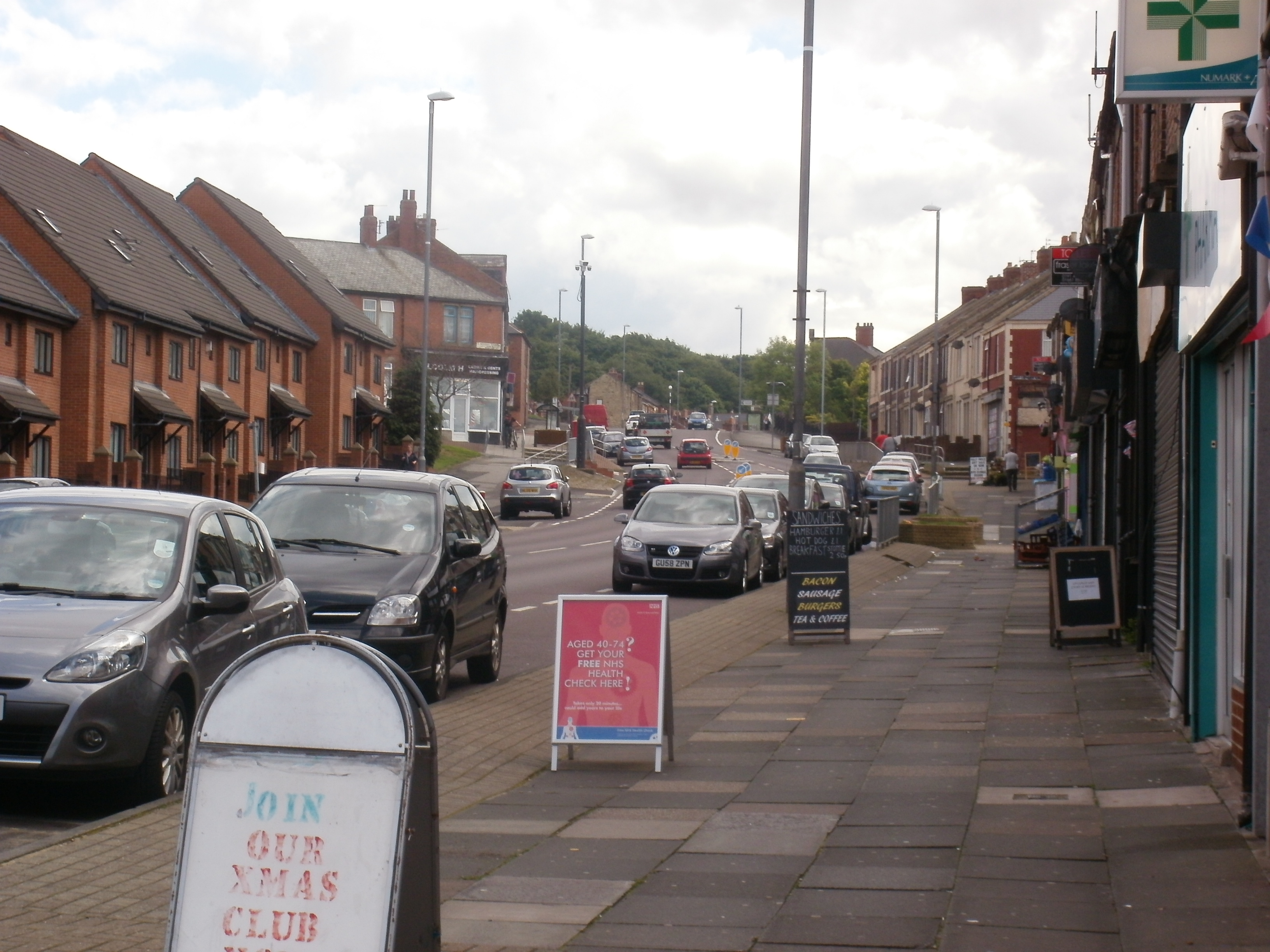
The shopping area on Old Durham Road is the economic hub of the area.

Unlike Sheriff Hill, Deckham was not founded on heavy industry. It developed primarily for its ease of access to the turnpike road, the principle route between Durham and Newcastle-upon-Tyne which ran through it. There is evidence of coal mining; the Durham Mining Museum has a record for 'Deckham Hall Colliery'. Few records of the colliery survive, and it is difficult to ascertain when it opened, but the colliery was located 1.5 miles south from Newcastle and was in the hands of Hopper, Hughes and Company in 1886. By December 1893 the colliery had been abandoned as being "not workable to a profit".

In common with most suburbs of the Metropolitan Borough of Gateshead, its economy is dominated by the economies of Newcastle–upon–Tyne and Gateshead town centre. This is reflected in terms of independent commercial space; retail floor space in the suburb totals 1% of that available in the whole metropolitan borough. There are 33 retail units concentrated on Old Durham Road, which provide some employment, though these are at the lower end of the spectrum and provide little choice. There is a good provision of hardware stores, fast–food outlets and hairdressers, a butcher's shop, a greengrocer and a supermarket, but there is no bakery, bank nor building society and the Post Office has closed. The retail units were domestic properties, so many are too small for retail purposes and around 20% are vacant.

Deckham suffers from high levels of unemployment; in 2011 the mean percentage of the population claiming Jobseekers Allowance was 7%. This compares to Gateshead's 5% average over the same period. Youth unemployment is 10%, compared to Gateshead's 9%.

== Geography and topography ==
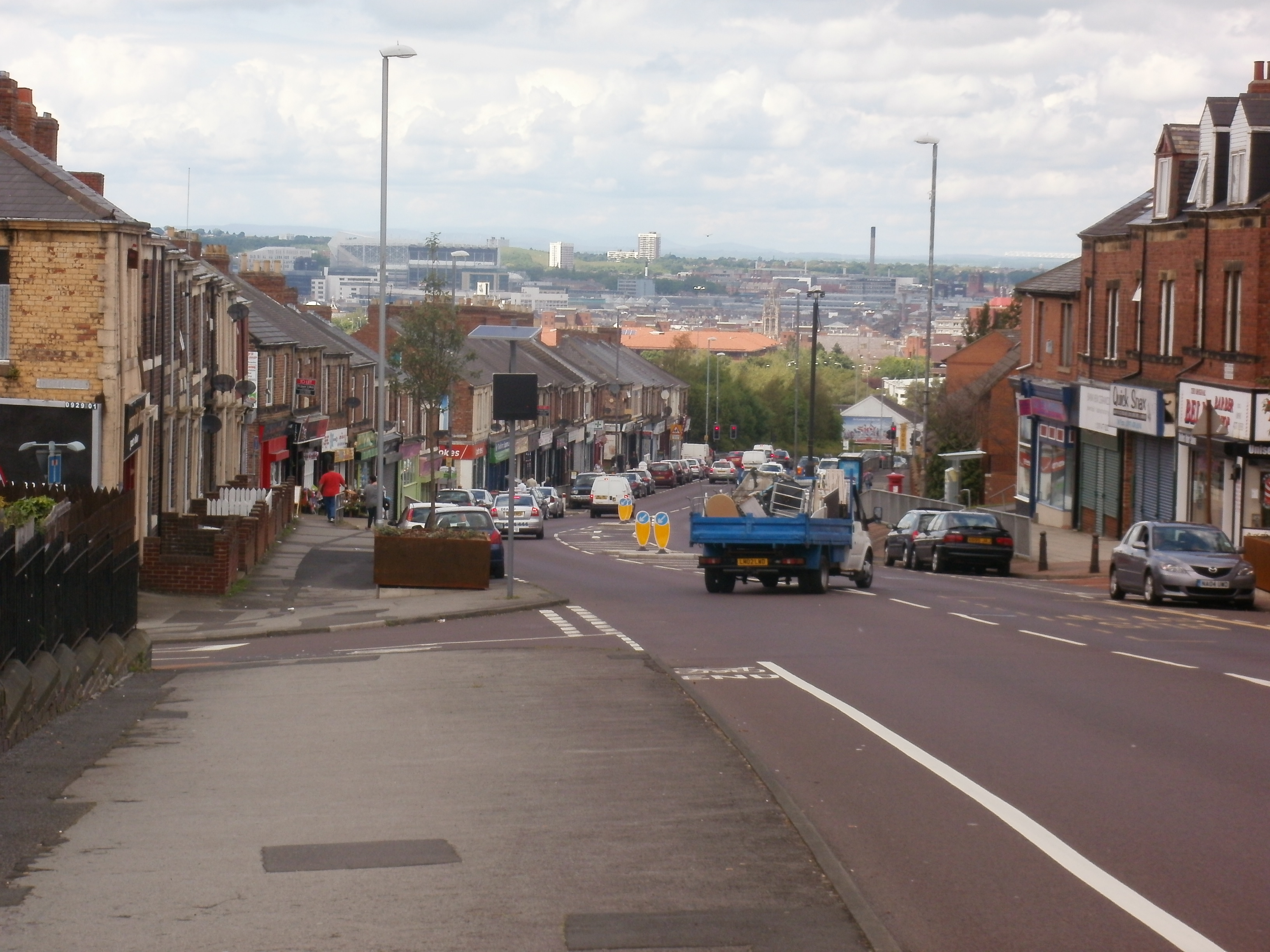
From the southern end of Old Durham Road, the steep slope north towards central Gateshead is apparent and the cityscape of Newcastle upon Tyne is clearly visible.

Deckham, at latitude 54.95° N and longitude 1.59 ° W, lies less than 1 mile (1.6 km) south and east of Gateshead town centre between two main transport corridors; Sunderland Road to the east and Old Durham Road to the west. The distance from Deckham to London is 255 miles (410 km). Deckham occupies an elevated position, especially at its north end which sits on a ridge, and some parts are steeply sloped– notably those which border Sheriff Hill to the south.

In the urban expansion of Gateshead, Deckham was enveloped so that its exact boundaries are difficult to define. The estate had boundaries at Split Crow Road, Old Durham Road, Hendon Road and Carr Hill Road but documents indicate that Deckham stretches to Durham Road in the west and the streets adjoining Hendon Road as far north as the Bankies open space at Mount Pleasant. In 1974 Deckham was incorporated into the Metropolitan Borough of Gateshead by the Local Government Act 1972. Until its implementation, Deckham was part of County Durham. It is now bordered by settlements which are part of the metropolitan borough. These are Sheriff Hill to the south, Low Fell and Shipcote to the west, Gateshead to the north and Felling and Carr Hill to the east.

Deckham has distinctive, steep topography which "shapes the character" of the suburb. Though the urbanisation of Gateshead has detracted from panoramic views that were once enjoyed by residents, the topography ensures that residents continue to have excellent views towards Newcastle-upon-Tyne and the Team Valley.

== Governance ==
Gateshead Council, Deckham–2012 local elections
Candidate name	Political party	Number of votes	% of votes cast
Brian Coates	Labour	1,407	70%
May Ainscow	Conservative	214	10.7%
Karen Therese Crozier	Liberal Democrats	146	7.3%
John Richards	National Front	124	6.2%
Norman Hall	Trade Unionist and Socialist Coalition	118	5.9%

Deckham is a council ward in the Metropolitan Borough of Gateshead. It is approximately 1.5 square kilometres (0.58 sq mi) in area and has a population of 9,228. It is represented by three councillors. In June 2012, they were Brian Coates, Martin Gannon and Bernadette Oliphant.

Deckham is part of the Westminster parliamentary constituency of Gateshead Central and Whickham. It was previously in the Gateshead East and Washington West constituency which was abolished by boundary changes before the 2010 UK General Election. For many years the MP was Joyce Quin, who retired on 11 April 2005 and was awarded a life peerage into the House of Lords on 13 June 2006 and is now Baroness Quin.

The present MP Mark Ferguson, is a member of the Labour party.

Deckham is in a safe Labour seat. Mearns' success in 2010 followed of Sharon Hodgson, who in the 2005 UK General Election polled over 60% of the votes cast whilst in 2001, Joyce Quin was returned with a majority of 53.3%.

== Demography ==
Deckham compared (2001)
	Deckham	Gateshead	England
Total population	7,886	191,151	49,138,831
White	98.0%	98.4%	90.9%
BME	2%	1.6%	4.6%
Aged 0–19	24.3%	24.2%	26.32%
Aged 65+	14.5%	17.3%	15.9%
Male	48.5%	48.3%	48.7%
Female	51.5%	51.7%	51.3%

According to the United Kingdom Census 2001, Deckham has a population of 9,228– 51.5% of the population are female, slightly above the national average, whilst 48.5% are male. Only 2% of the population are from a black or other minority ethnic group (BME), as opposed to 9.1% of the national population. Of the BME group, 35% are from the Asian or Asian–British ethnic group. Deckham has a high proportion of lone parent households at some 15% of all households. This is the third highest figure in Gateshead and compares with a borough average of 11.5%. Some 31% of households have dependent children, as opposed to 29.5% nationally and 28.4% in Gateshead. The Index of Multiple Deprivation, which divides England into 32,482 areas and measures quality of life to indicate deprivation, splits Deckham into halves and lists the western half, along with Carr Hill and Sheriff Hill, in the top 10% of all deprived areas in England in 2012. The eastern half is in the top 5% of deprived areas.

In 2011 however, the ethnic minority population increased rapidly. In 2001, 96.8% of Deckham's population were white British, this figure reduced to 92.3% white British in 2011. Also, the population increased massively too, from 7,886 in 2001 to 9,938 in 2011. 88.8% of adults in lone parent households with independent children were women.

In 2011, 7.7% of Deckham's population were non-white British. This is above average for the Metropolitan borough of Gateshead, but below average for the town of Gateshead which Deckham forms a part of.

Deckham compared 2011	Gateshead Town	Deckham (ward)
White British	92.0%	92.3%
Asian	2.5%	2.6%
Black	0.8%	0.7%

Deckham is situated to the east of Gateshead town centre. It is also split into three sub districts, Central Deckham, Mount Pleasant and Carr Hill.

== Culture ==
=== Notable buildings ===
Deckham has three buildings listed by English Heritage. They are 33 and 35 Fife Street and the Church of St George.

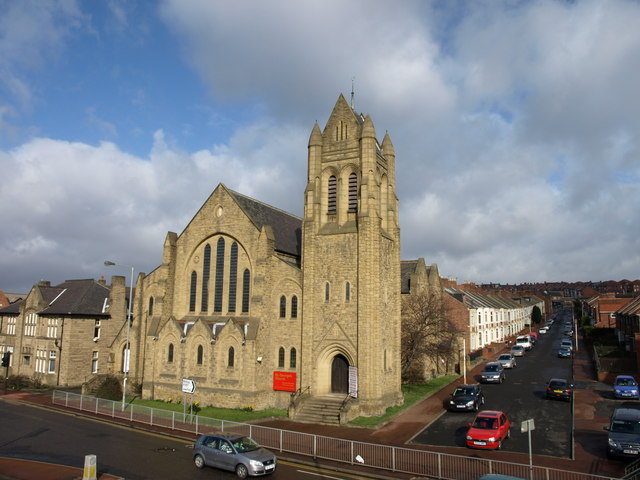
The Church of St George

The flats at 33 and 35 Fife Street, in Mount Pleasant, are Grade II Listed buildings. Described by English Heritage as "perhaps the last surviving example of an unspoilt, 2–flat dwelling of high quality but modest size", they were built in the latter part of the 19th century from sandstone ashlar and slate. The Church of St George is an Anglican church at the corner of Inskip Terrace and Durham Road built in 1896 by Stephen Piper of Newcastle. This "bold and remarkably simple" church consists of a nave, vestry, bell tower and porch, is built in sandstone and remains in very good condition. Access to the bell tower is by spiral staircase and the staircase and bells are in good order. Of particular note is the church organ; a Father Willis built organ which has been described as "an utter gem" and "exceptional".

Deckham's other church is the Emmanuel Pentecostal Church, a plain, stone building located in a prominent position on the corner of Caris Street and Old Durham Road. Little is documented regarding this church, and the date of building is difficult to ascertain, though the Pentecostal movement in Britain dates to 1907 and the church was certified for the solemnising of marriages as recently as 21 October 1959. The Church is a member of the Assembly of God denomination of Pentecostalism and hold weekly Sunday worship, a prayer service on Mondays and a children's group on Wednesdays.

Two more buildings were locally listed as places of special interest by Gateshead Council. These are Carr Hill Clinic at Carr Hill Road/Ilford Place and St Mark's Methodist Church at Shipcote Terrace.

=== Venues ===
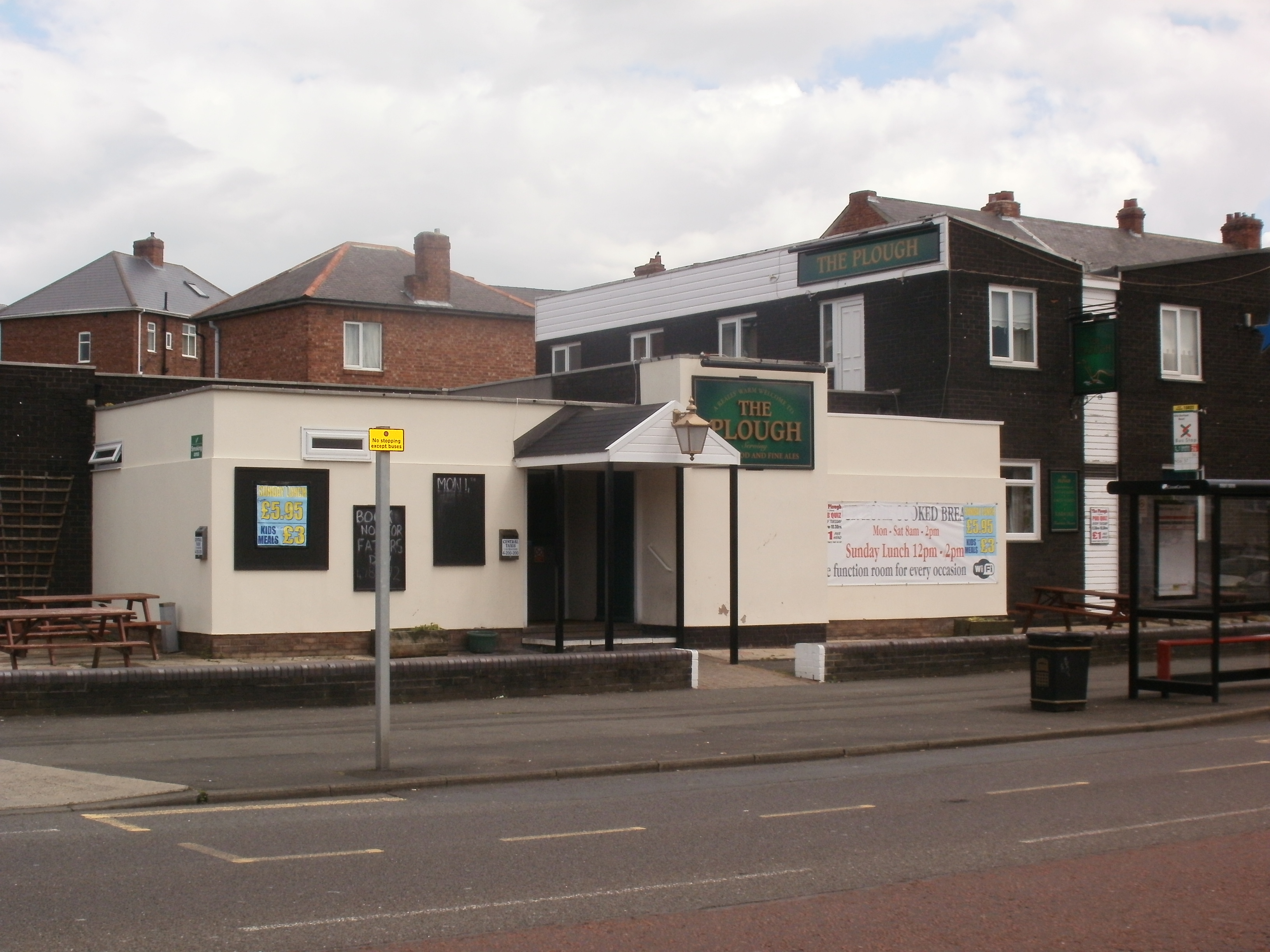
The Plough Inn, Old Durham Road

Deckham has several public houses. The Plough Inn on Old Durham Road and is evidenced on the ordnance survey map in 1862 where it is shown as 'Speed the Plough'. The Shakespeare Inn is on Split Crow Road and Mount Pleasant Working Mans Club is described by one official document as "intrusive" though it hosts several local housing discussion groups. The Deckham Inn at the junction of Split Crow Road and Old Durham Road, was closed in the early 21st century and an application to demolish it to make way for residential flats was approved in 2004. After objections were raised planning approval was rescinded but it was demolished in 2011.

== Community facilities ==
There are no libraries in Deckham, though Gateshead Central Library, the largest library in the Metropolitan Borough of Gateshead, is nearby. Gateshead Leisure Centre in Shipcote and Saltwell Park are close by.

=== The Elgin Centre ===
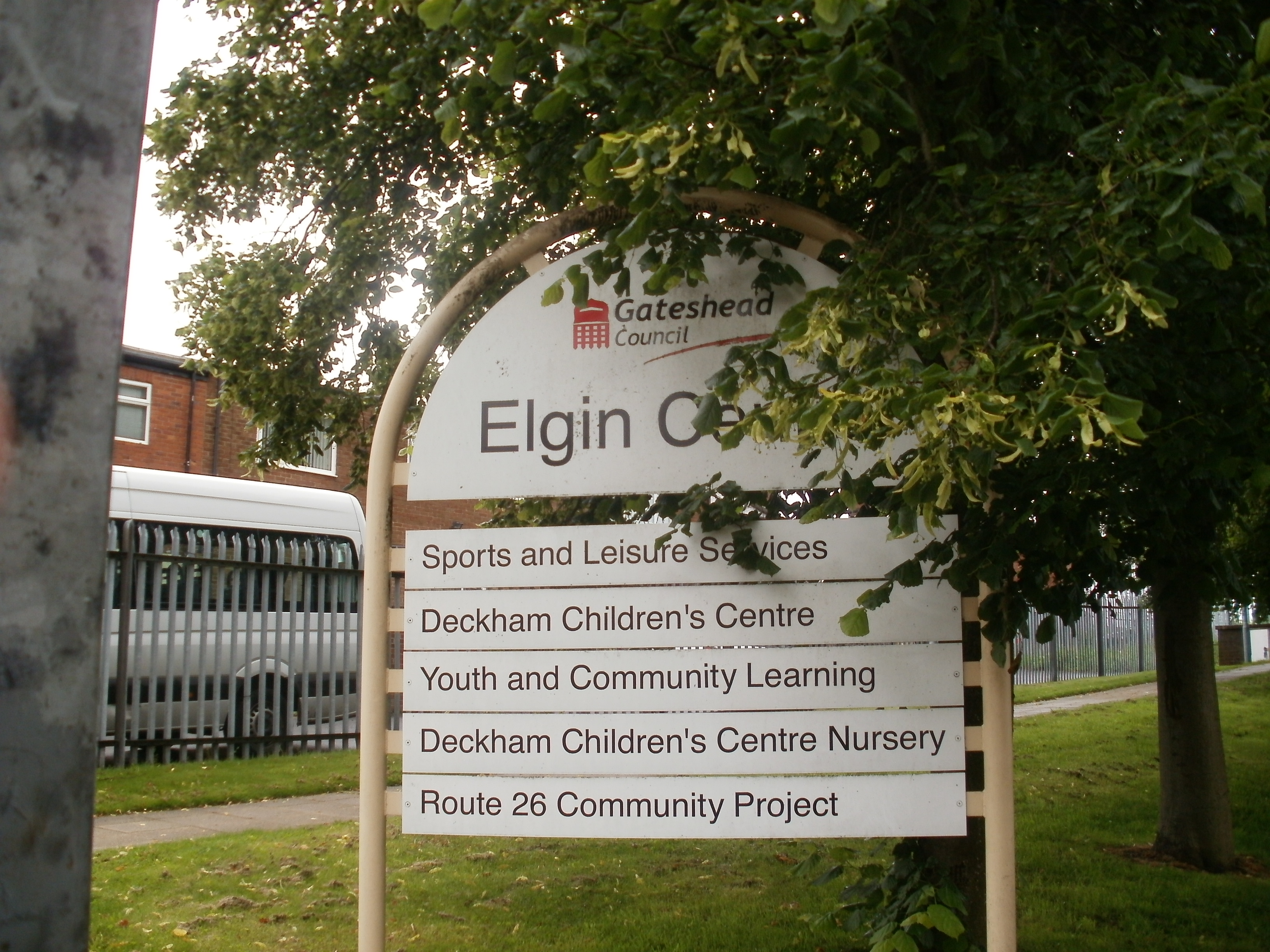
Entrance to the Elgin Centre

The Elgin Centre is on Elgin Road at the south–east boundary between Deckham and Carr Hill. Whilst geographically outside Deckham, the centre provides "the key cluster" of community provisions for its residents. These facilities contribute to the regeneration of the suburb.

The facilities are utilized by the Route 26 Community Project; a registered charity based at the centre which aims to work towards the betterment of lives in Deckham and neighbouring wards. The project works with Gateshead Council and the Gateshead Housing Company to provide a community cafe promoting healthy eating (the 'T–Junction'), a gymnasium, indoor sports hall, outdoor Five-a-side football pitches and a meeting place for resident groups. The project has education provision for young children as a registered day–care provider and it also offers adult education and training. The project hosts the 'Carnival on the Hill/Deckham Festival'; a collaborative enterprise between Route 26, Gateshead Council and Home Group which offers free activities, such as go-karting and children's soft play, against the backdrop of a steel band. The second Deckham Festival was held on 3 September 2011 and attracted over one thousand visitors, including Mayor of Gateshead and BBC local weatherman Paul Mooney.

=== Gateshead Older People's Assembly ===
Based in what was Deckham Village Hall, Gateshead Older People's Assembly is a charity working to provide opportunities for over 50s to improve their health and maintain their independence. The charity was established in 2002 and supports activities for older people in 18 of Gateshead's 22 wards. In Deckham, the charity runs a thriving wellness hub which welcomes hundreds of older people each week. In addition to a community garden and a large outdoor area dedicated to exercise groups, the charity offers the following activities for older people:

·Staying Steady falls prevention programme ·Dancercise ·Strength & Balance classes ·Never Too Old to Rock ·Tai Chi ·Cosy Crow Singing Group ·Deckham Social Group ·Pilates ·Ukulele Group ·Samba Percussion Group ·Art Group ·Reminiscence Group ·Craft Group ·Belly Dancing ·Tea Dance ·Zoom exercise classes and social activities

Activities are open to all Gateshead residents aged 50+.

== Transport ==
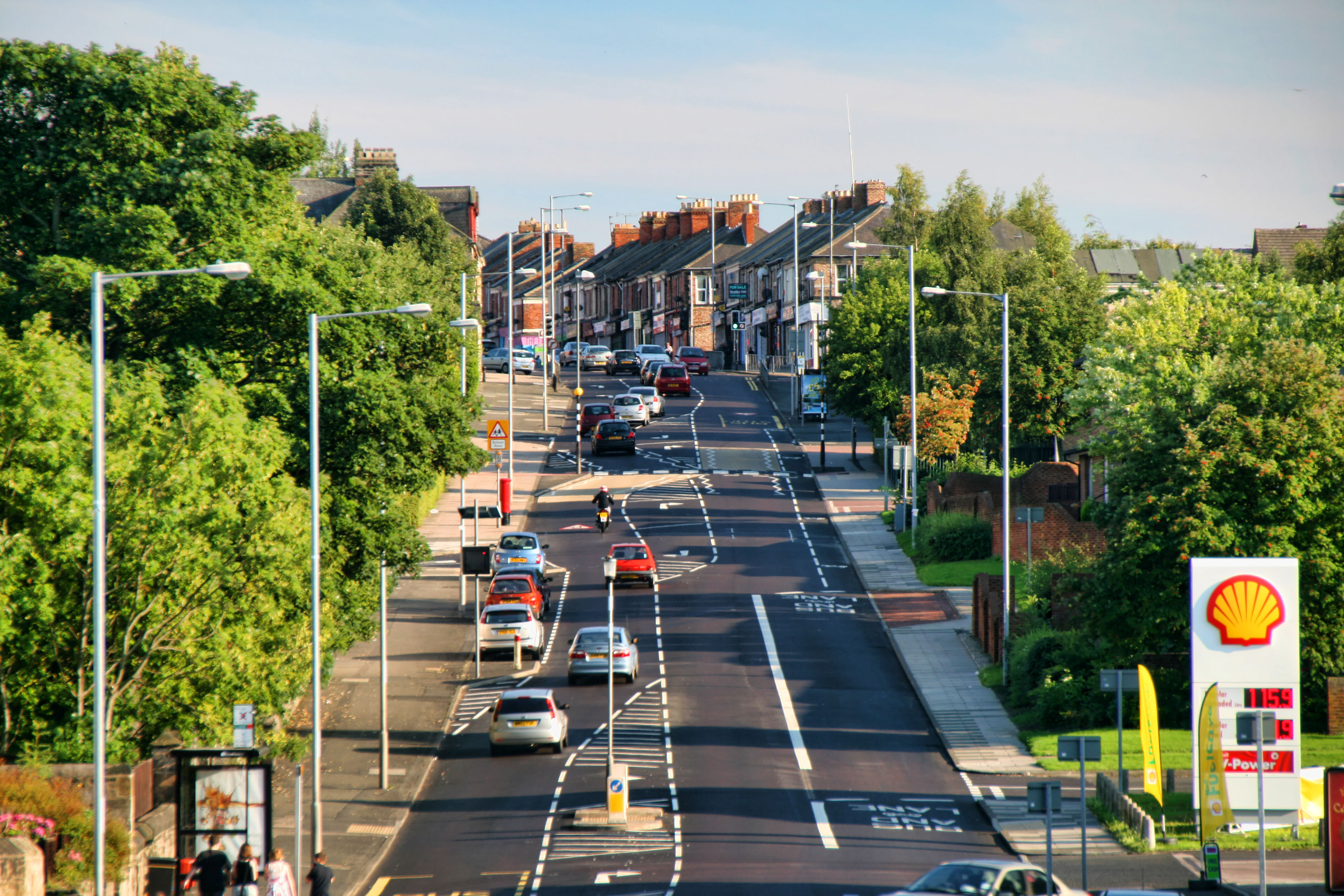
The principal road, the B1296, extends southwards from the Gateshead Roundabout uphill into Deckham.

The suburb is crossed by the B1296 Old Durham Road, a commuter road and route of the Great North Road before it was diverted through Low Fell on the route of the A167. Journey time by car or bus to Gateshead town centre is approximately 5 minutes, and 10–12 minutes into the centre of Newcastle upon Tyne.

Deckham is in a "metro corridor" so that it is broadly equidistant from Gateshead Metro station and Gateshead Stadium Metro station.

Deckham is on a major bus route into Gateshead; and Old Durham Road is a "bus priority route". The suburb is served by several bus services, such as the Cityrider 56 which continues into Sunderland, the 57 which terminates at Wardley and the East Gateshead Rider 58. It is also part of the 51/52 network. Services to MetroCentre and Chester-le-Street also run through and stop in the area. Buses serving Deckham are operated by Go North East and Gateshead Central Taxis under the administration of Nexus.

== Education ==
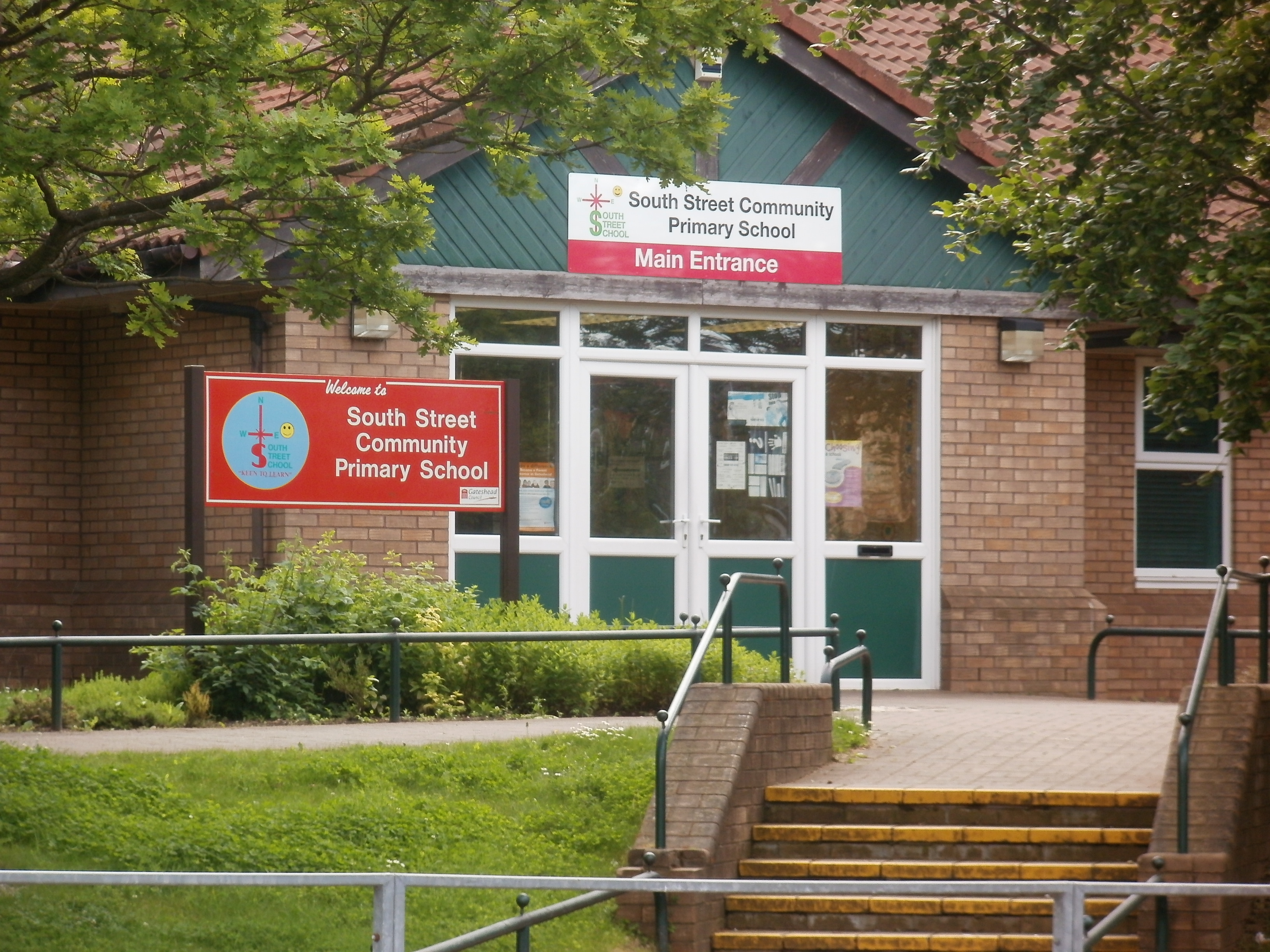
The entrance to South Street Primary School; the only school in Deckham.

South Street Community Primary school at the northern end of Deckham in Cramer Street and caters for pupils in the 3–11 age range. The number of pupils eligible for free school meals is well above the national average. In the most recent OFSTED inspection, the nursery provision was praised for enabling children who enter the school with skills below that expected of similarly–aged children nationwide to achieve well through a stimulating and engaging curriculum and the nursery provision was good overall. The primary provision was praised for providing a safe and engaging learning environment in which children are able to progress to a level broadly comparable with children nationally and where pupils are extremely well behaved. In all inspection categories, the primary provision was judged good.

South Street Primary is the only school in Deckham. Some children of primary–school age, particularly those living in the east of Deckham, attend nearby Carr Hill Primary School instead.

Deckham compares unfavourably with the wider Gateshead area in respect of adults with educational qualifications. 43% of adults have no educational qualifications, compared to 38.4% across the whole of Gateshead and the England average of 28.9%. Only 17% of adults have five or more GCSEs or equivalent at A*–C (compared to 36.9% across Gateshead and 47.6% nationally) whilst 6% of adults in the suburb have two or more A-Level's (or equivalent).

== Bibliography ==
=== Academic texts ===
- Carlton, Ian Clark (1974). A Short History of Gateshead. Gateshead Corporation. ISBN 0-901273-04-X.
- Harper, Charles George (2009). The Great North Road, the Old Mail Road to Scotland. BiblioLife. ISBN 978-1-113-19919-5.
- MacKenzie, Eneas (1827). Historical Account of Newcastle-upon-Tyne: Including the Borough of Gateshead. McKenzie and Dent. ISBN 1-144-29746-X.
- MacKenzie and Ross (1834). An Historical, Topographical and Descriptive View of the County Palatine of Durham. McKenzie and Ross. ISBN 1-150-79679-0.
- Manders, Francis William David (1973). A History of Gateshead. Gateshead Corporation. ISBN 0-901273-02-3.
- Pevsner, Nikolaus (1983). The Buildings of England–County Durham. Yale University Press. ISBN 0-300-09599-6.
- Ward, Inna (2012). Whitaker's Almanack. Bloomsbury Publishing. ISBN 978-1-4081-3012-4.

=== Journals, publications, reports and other sources ===
Where an abbreviation is used in the references this is indicated below in (brackets) at the end of the source name. When a source is available online, a link has been included.

- Bailey, Marion (2007). "Route 26 Community Project Annual Report 2006 – 2007" (PDF). Route 26 Community Project.
- Bradbury, Jennifer (15 September 2006). "The Plough". Newcastle Evening Chronicle.
- Bradshaw, Gavin (2011). "Central Area News (Issue 22)" (PDF). Gateshead Council.
- Bradshaw, Gavin (2011). "Central Area News (Christmas Issue)" (PDF). Gateshead Council. Archived from the original (PDF) on 5 March 2016.
- GVA Grimley (2006). "Deckham – Executive Summary" (PDF). Gateshead Council. Archived from the original (PDF) on 31 August 2012. (GVA)
- GVA Grimley (February 2006). "Deckham – Neighbourhood Profile Supporting Document" (PDF). Gateshead Council. Archived from the original (PDF) on 31 August 2012. (NPSD)
- GVA Grimley (2005). "Deckham – Preferred Plan" (PDF). Gateshead Council. Archived from the original (PDF) on 31 August 2012.
- GVA Grimley (March 2006). "Urban Design, Heritage, & Character Analysis Report– Deckham" (PDF). Gateshead Council. Archived from the original (PDF) on 31 August 2012. (UHC)
- Hutchinson, Lisa (4 February 2011). "Thousands in tribute to tragic Callum Wears". Newcastle Evening Chronicle.
- Jones, Dennis (18 October 2011). "Quinquennial Survey of Fabric– St George's Church" (PDF). Archdeaconry of Durham.
- Morgan, Bryn (2001). General Election Results– June 7, 2001. House of Commons.
- Nathaniel Lichfield and Partners (2006). Deckham – Neighbourhood Housing Analysis. Gateshead Council. (NLP)
- Oxborough, Brian (31 December 2008). "Emmanuel Pentecostal Church– Annual Reports and Accounts" (PDF). Emmanuel Pentecostal Church.
- Quinn, David (February 2004). Report to Council – Local Lists of Buildings, and Parks and Gardens of Special Interest. Gateshead Council. Archived from the original on 2 April 2012.
- Shearsmith, David (17–18 June 2008). South Street Community Primary School – Inspection report (PDF). OFSTED.
- Walton, Clarence (24 August 1962). A Gateshead pioneer led settlers in Africa.
- Wearmouth, Rachel (16 May 2011). "Memorial fund to honour memory of Deckham teen". Newcastle Evening Chronicle.
- Unknown (2008). "Achieving Excellent Outcomes in Deckham – Economy, Housing and Transport" (PDF). Gateshead Council. Archived from the original (PDF) on 31 August 2012. (EHT)
- Unknown (24 May 2003). "Blaze damage centre reopens". Newcastle Evening Chronicle.
- Unknown (6 February 2009). "Deckham Planning Refusal Update". Gateshead Council.
- Unknown (2012). "Gateshead East and Washington West". The Guardian.
- Unknown (2006). "GC07 – Deckham West" (PDF). Gateshead Council. Archived from the original (PDF) on 30 August 2012. (GC07)
- Unknown (2006). "GC08 – Argyll" (PDF). Gateshead Council. Archived from the original (PDF) on 30 August 2012. (GC08)
- Unknown (2006). "GC09 – Deckham East" (PDF). Gateshead Council. Archived from the original (PDF) on 30 August 2012. (GC09)
- Unknown (2012). "Local Elections 2012 – Results". Gateshead Council. Archived from the original on 18 June 2012.
- Unknown (13 December 2005). Local New– Fed Switch. Newcastle Evening Chronicle.
- Unknown (2012). "Ms Joyce Quin". Theyworkforyou.org.
- Unknown (2012). "Ward Factsheet – Deckham" (PDF). Gateshead Council. Archived from the original (PDF) on 30 August 2012.
