= Harold Elverston =

British politician (1866–1941)

Sir Harold Elverston (26 December 1866 – 10 August 1941) was a British Liberal Party politician.

== Background ==
He was born on 26 December 1866, the third son of James Booth Elverston of Heaton Chapel, Stockport. He was educated privately. He married in 1899, Josephine Taylor, daughter of J. J. Taylor of Rusholme, a newspaper proprietor. They had three sons.

== Career ==
He was a member of Manchester City Council. He served on the Executive Committee of the National Liberal Federation from 1906 to 1910. He served as Hon. Secretary of the Lancashire and Cheshire Liberal Federation from 1906 to 1925.

He served as a Justice of the Peace in Cheshire. He first stood for parliament when he contested the 1908 Worcester by-election, a seat that the Conservatives held. He was Liberal Member of Parliament for Gateshead from 1910 to 1918. Gateshead was a seat that the Liberals had won in 1906 with their candidate being sponsored by the Durham Miners' Association. The miners unions were independent until the Miners' Federation of Great Britain voted to affiliate to the Labour Party. They instructed all miners sponsored MPs to stand for re-election as Labour candidates and this is what happened in Gateshead. However, the local Liberal Association wanted a Liberal candidate to defend the seat and selected Elverston. He won the seat and the sitting Labour MP finished bottom of the poll:

Gateshead, General election January 1910 Electorate 19,138
Party	Candidate	Votes	%	±%
Liberal	Harold Elverston	6,800	40.7	+40.7
Liberal Unionist	Nicholas Grattan-Doyle	6,323	37.9	+3.2
Labour	John Johnson	3,572	21.4	−43.9
Majority		477	2.8	
Turnout			87.2	+7.8
Liberal gain from Labour		Swing	+42.3	

He held the seat at the following General Election shortly after;

Gateshead, General election December 1910 Electorate 19,138
Party	Candidate	Votes	%	±%
Liberal	Harold Elverston	8,763	61.0	+20.3
Conservative	Herbert Conyers Surtees	5,608	39.0	+1.1
Majority		3,155	22.0	+19.2
Turnout			75.1	
Liberal hold		Swing		

He was knighted in 1911. He sought to defend his seat at the general election at the end of the war but was up against a Unionist candidate who had the Coalition Coupon of support for the Lloyd George Government. As a result, he finished bottom of the poll;

Gateshead, General election 1918 Electorate 55,443
Party	Candidate	Votes	%	±%
Unionist	Brig-Gen. Herbert Conyers Surtees	17,215	56.9	+17.9
Labour	John Brotherton	7,212	23.8	+23.8
Liberal	Sir Harold Elverston	5,833	19.3	−41.7
Majority		10,003	33.1	
Turnout			54.6	
Unionist gain from Liberal		Swing		

He did not stand for parliament again.

He was elected as a member of Cheshire County Council in 1921. He again served on the Executive Committee of the National Liberal Federation from 1921 to 1925.

Outside politics he was a member of the Council of Royal Manchester College of Music, a member of the Advisory Committee of the Royal London Mutual Assurance Society, and a director of Mutual Finance Ltd.

== Sources ==
- Who Was Who
- British parliamentary election results 1885–1918, Craig, F. W. S.

Parliament of the United Kingdom
Preceded by John Johnson	Member of Parliament for Gateshead; January 1910–1918	Succeeded by Herbert Conyers Surtees
