= Conyers Surtees =

British politician (1858–1933)

Brigadier-General Sir Conyers Surtees CB CMG DSO MVO JP FSA

Member of Parliament for Gateshead
- In office 14 December 1918 – 26 October 1922
- Preceded by: Sir Harold Elverston
- Succeeded by: John Brotherton

Personal details
- Born: 13 January 1858 London, England
- Died: 18 April 1933 (aged 75) London, England
- Party: Conservative
- Relations: Virginia Surtees (granddaughter); Evangeline Bruce (granddaughter)
- Parent(s): Charles Freville Surtees; Bertha Chauncey Surtees
- Education: Sandhurst Military College

Brigadier-General Sir Herbert Conyers Surtees CB CMG DSO MVO JP FSA (13 January 1858 – 18 April 1933) was a British Army officer, politician and historical author.

== Early life ==
He was born in London on 13 January 1858. He was the only son of Col. Charles Freville Surtees of the 10th Hussars and his wife, Bertha Chauncey. He was christened in St James' Church in Paddington. He was descended from Robert Surtees of Mainsforth. His father was MP for South Durham 1865 to 1868.

He was educated at Harrow School and the Royal Military College, Sandhurst, before entering the British Army in 1876, joining the 49th Regiment of Foot. In October 1877 he transferred to the Coldstream Guards and remained with them for the rest of his career.

== Career ==
He worked initially as a "musket instructor". From 1884 to 1887 he was posted in Egypt. He was promoted to Captain in 1887 and Major in 1895. He mainly served with the Coldstream Guards he rose to the rank of Brigadier General. He saw action as a Lt. Colonel in from 1899 to 1900 South Africa (during the Boer War).

In 1899, he saw action at the Siege of Kimberley, Belmont, Enslin, the Modder River, Magersfontein, and the Orange Free State. In 1900 he saw action at Driefontein, the Vet River, the Zand River and Belfast. For these numerous actions he received the Queen's South African Medal with six clasps (indicating seven awards). He also received the DSO.

In 1904, he was promoted to Brevet Colonel and served as a military attache in Constantinople and Athens.

He retired in 1912, but came out of retirement due to the First World War commanding the 52nd Infantry Brigade in France and Belgium. On 21 April 1916 he was appointed as an inspector of infantry at the War Office in London and was granted the temporary rank of brigadier general whilst employed in this role.

=== Political career ===
From 1918 to 1922 he was the Member of Parliament for Gateshead as a Conservative. He lived at Mainsforth Hall (inherited from his father, demolished in 1962 though the Mainsforth Hall south entrance gate piers and gates on east boundary survive and are Grade II listed) near Ferryhill in County Durham.

A notable freemason he was created Provincial Grand Master for Durham in October 1932 and Provisional Prior of the Knights Templar in November 1932.

== Personal life ==
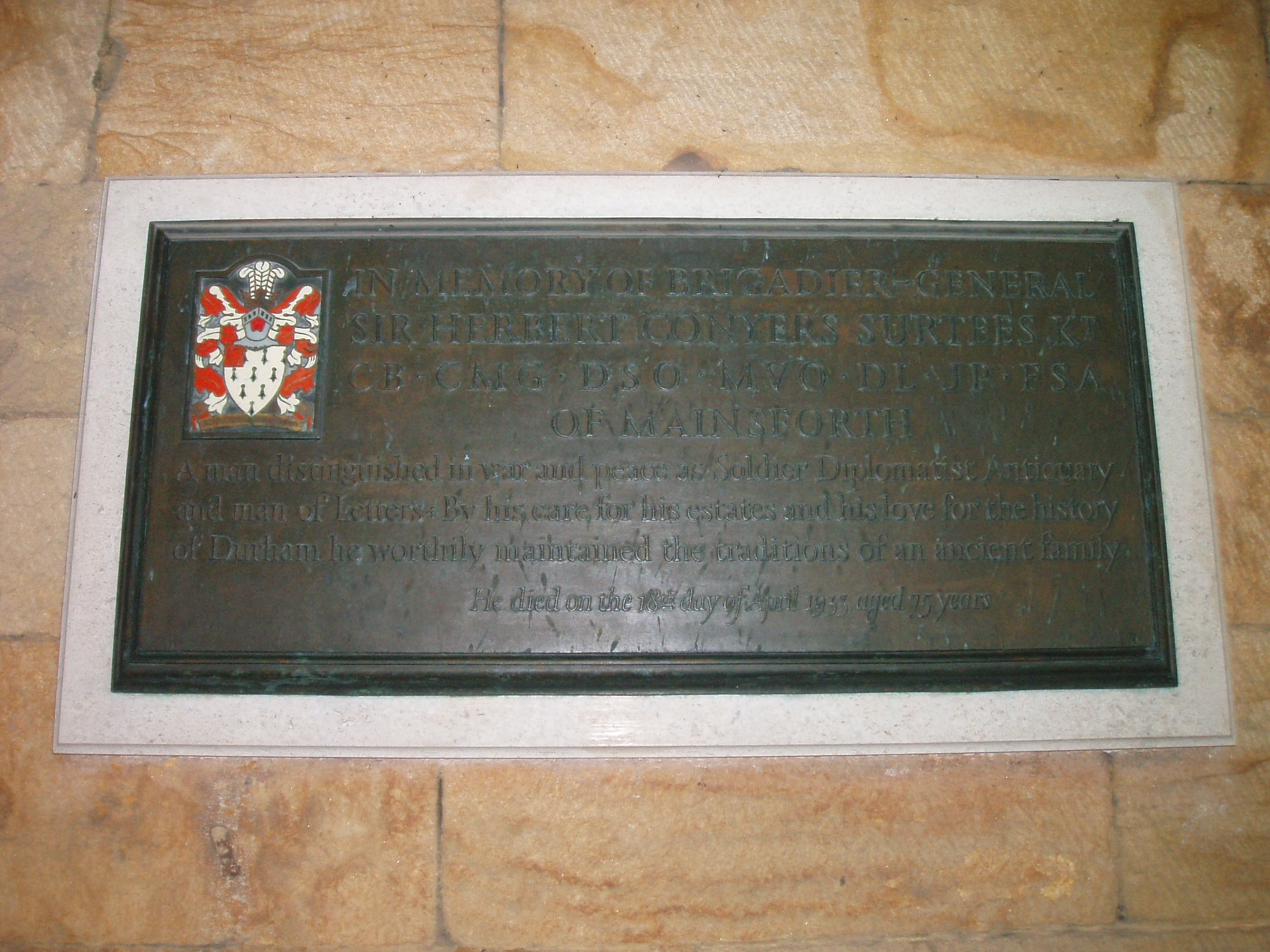
Plaque for Brigadier-General Herbert Conyers Surtees in Durham Cathedral

In 1887 he married Madeline Augusta Crabbe, daughter of Edward Crabbe and his wife Ruth Herbert, a stage actress and the artist's model to Dante Gabriel Rossetti. Together, Madeline and Herbert had two daughters:

- Dorothy Cynthia Surtees (1890–1957), who married Christopher Cecil Tower. After his death, she married Sir Patrick Ramsay, the second son of John Ramsay, 13th Earl of Dalhousie and a brother-in-law of Princess Patricia of Connaught (through her husband Sir Alexander Ramsay).
- Etelka Bertha Surtees (1891–1974), who married the American diplomat Edward J. Bell (1882–1924), nephew of the publisher James Gordon Bennett Jr., in 1914. After his death in Peking (while acting Minister to China when Minister Jacob Gould Schurman was in Washington) in 1924, she remarried to Sir James Leishman Dodds (1891–1972), a son of Under-Secretary of State for Scotland Sir James Miller Dodds, in Paris in 1927. During World War II, Dodds was the British Minister to Bolivia.

He died in London on 18 April 1933 after an operation. His widow, a recipient of Turkish Order of the Chefaket, died in 1957. After Lady Surtees' death, their granddaughter Virginia inherited Mainsforth Hall and changed her name to Surtees in 1962.

=== Descendants ===
Through his daughter Dorothy, he was a grandfather of David Patrick Maule Ramsay (1919–1978), who married (and divorced) Hélène Arvanitidi, and James Surtees Maule Ramsay (1923–1944), a Lt. in the Scots Guards who died in the Netherlands at the Western Front during World War II.

From his daughter Etelka's first marriage, he was a grandfather of noted society hostess and writer Evangeline Bell, who married David K. E. Bruce (a son of U.S. Senator William Cabell Bruce, he served as the U.S. Ambassador to France, the Federal Republic of Germany, and the United Kingdom), and Virginia Bell, who married (and later divorced) Sir Henry Ashley Clarke, the British Ambassador to Italy. From Etelka's second marriage, he was a grandfather of Josephine Leishman Dodds, who married Squadron Leader Hugh Glyn Laurence Arthur Brooking in 1949. Brooking, the King's Messenger, a younger son of Hugh Cyril Arthur Brooking.

=== Legacy and honours ===
He was knighted by King George V in 1932. After his death, a memorial plaque was erected in the cloister of Durham Cathedral to his memory. His portrait is held by Darlington Library.

== Publications ==
- The History of the Church of St Brandon in Brancepeth, County Durham (1919)
- The History of the castle of Brancepeth at Brancepeth, County Durham (1920)
- The History of the Parish of Byers Green, including the Townships of Newfield and Binchester (1922)
- The History of the Township of Newton Cap in the County Palatine of Durham (1922)
- The History of the Village and Church of Escombe, County Durham (1922)
- The History of the Parish of Byers Green, including the Townships of Newfield and Binchester (1922)
- The History of Frosterley and District in the County Palatine of Durham (1923)
- The History of New Shildon and East Thickley in the County Palatine of Durham (1923)
- The History of the Parishes of Hunwick, Helmington, Witton Park and Etherley in the County Palatine of Durham (1923)
- The History of the Parish and Township of Evenwood and the Parish of Eldon in the County Palatine of Durham (1923)
- The History of the Parish of Coundon with the townships of Coundon, Westerton and Windlestone in the County Palatine of Durham (1924)
- The History of the Parish and Township of St. Helen Auckland in the County Palatine of Durham together with the Township of West Auckland (1924)
- The History of the Parish of Witton-le-Wear in the County Palatine of Durham (1924)
- The History of the Parish of Middleton-in-Teesdale in the County of Durham with the townships of Egglestone, Newbiggin, and Forest and Frith with Harwood (1924)
- The History of the Parishes of Tudhoe and Sunnybrow in the County Palatine of Durham (1925)
- The History of the Parishes of Willington and Crook with Billy Row and Stanley in the County Palatine of Durham (1925)
- The History of the Parishes of St. John's Chapel and Heathery Cleugh in the County Palatine of Durham (1925)
- Records of the Family of Surtees (1925)
- The History of the Parishes of Rookhope, Westgate and Eastgate in the County Palatine of Durham (1925)
- The History of the Parishes of Hamsterley and Lynesack and Softley in the County Palatine of Durham (1926)
- The History of the Parishes of Thornley and Tow Law, together with the Lordship of Bradley and the Ecclesiastical Parish of Firtree, with the Township of North Redburn in the County Palatine of Durham (1926)
- The History of Durham Castle (1928)
- The History of the Parish of Wolsingham (1929)
- The history of the Parish of Brancepeth together with the civil and ecclesiastical parish and township of Brandon with Byshottles, including East and West Brandon, Holywell, Langley Moor, Littleburn, Browney, Sleetburn and Waterhouses with Hareholm and NewHouse (1930)
- The Heraldry of the Cloisters of Durham Cathedral (1930)
- Memorial Inscriptions in Durham Cathedral (1932)

Parliament of the United Kingdom
Preceded by Sir Harold Elverston	Member of Parliament for Gateshead; 1918 – 1922	Succeeded by John Brotherton
