= Herbert Evans (politician) =

British Labour MP (1868-1931)

Member of Parliament for Gateshead
- In office 8 June 1931 – 7 October 1931

Personal details
- Born: 1868
- Died: 7 October 1931 (aged 62–63)

Herbert Evans (1868 – 7 October 1931) was a Labour Party politician in the United Kingdom.

He contested the 1929 general election in the Conservative safe seat of Maldon in Essex, where the Conservative vote fell but the gains were made by the Liberal candidate.

He was elected as member of parliament (MP) for Gateshead at a by-election in June 1931, following the death of the Labour MP Sir James Melville. However, four months later Evans died in office aged 63, on the day when Parliament was dissolved for the 1931 general election.

== See also ==
List of United Kingdom MPs with the shortest service

Parliament of the United Kingdom
Preceded by James Melville	Member of Parliament for Gateshead; June 1931–October 1931	Succeeded by Thomas Magnay
