= Gateshead Central and Whickham =

UK Parliament constituency (since 2024)

Coordinates: 54.95°N 1.64°W

- Borough constituency for the House of Commons
- Interactive map of boundaries since 2024
- Location within North East England
- County: Tyne and Wear
- Electorate: 69,827 (2024)
- Major settlements: Gateshead and Whickham

Current constituency
- Created: 2024
- Member of Parliament: Mark Ferguson (Labour)
- Seats: One
- Created from: Gateshead; Blaydon (part)

Gateshead Central and Whickham is a constituency in Tyne and Wear represented in the House of Commons of the UK Parliament since 2024 by Mark Ferguson of the Labour Party. The constituency was created by the 2023 review of Westminster constituencies, and was first contested at the 2024 general election.

== Constituency profile ==
Gateshead Central and Whickham is an urban and suburban constituency located in the Metropolitan Borough of Gateshead in the county of Tyne and Wear. It lies on the south bank of the River Tyne opposite the city of Newcastle upon Tyne and forms part of the city's wider urban area. The constituency covers the central and western parts of the large town of Gateshead and the villages of Whickham and Sunniside. The area has an industrial heritage in ironworking and engineering. High levels of deprivation are present in Gateshead whilst Whickham and Sunniside are comparatively wealthier. House prices are similar to the rest of North East England but low compared to national averages.

In general, residents of the constituency have average levels of education and professional employment. Average household income is lower than the rest of the country but similar to the rest of North East England. White people made up 91% of the population at the 2021 census. At the local borough council, most of Gateshead is represented by the Labour Party whilst Whickham and Sunniside elected Liberal Democrats. An estimated 55% of voters in the constituency supported leaving the European Union in the 2016 referendum, marginally higher than the nationwide figure of 52%.

== Boundaries ==
Further to the 2023 boundary review, the constituency was defined as composing the following wards of the Metropolitan Borough of Gateshead (as they existed on 1 December 2020):

- Bridges; Chowdene; Deckham; Dunston & Teams^{1}; Dunston Hill & Whickham East; High Fell; Lobley Hill and Bensham; Low Fell; Saltwell; Whickham North^{1}; Whickham South & Sunniside.

^{1} Further to a local government boundary review which came into effect in May 2026, these wards were renamed Dunston, Teams & Riverside, and Whickham North & Swalwell, respectively.

The seat was formed from the majority of the abolished Gateshead constituency, with the addition of the three wards which incorporate the community of Whickham from the abolished constituency of Blaydon.

== Members of Parliament ==
Gateshead prior to 2024

Election	Member	Party
2024	Mark Ferguson	Labour Party

== Elections ==
=== Elections in the 2020s ===
General election 2024: Gateshead Central and Whickham
Party	Candidate	Votes	%	±%
Labour	Mark Ferguson	18,245	45.4	−1.7
Reform	Damian Heslop	8,601	21.4	+17.5
Liberal Democrats	Ron Beadle	4,987	12.4	+0.2
Conservative	Nick Oliver	4,628	11.5	−21.5
Green	Rachel Cabral	3,217	8.0	+4.2
TUSC	Norman Hall	369	0.9	N/A
Save Us Now	Graham Steele	170	0.4	N/A
Majority		9,644	24.0	+9.9
Turnout		40,217	57.6	−1.6
Registered electors		69,827		
Labour hold		Swing		

=== Elections in the 2010s ===
2019 notional result
Party	Vote	%
Labour	19,787	47.1
Conservative	13,876	33.0
Liberal Democrats	5,138	12.2
Brexit	1,629	3.9
Green	1,430	3.8
Turnout	42,021	59.2
Electorate	70,994	

== See also ==
- Parliamentary constituencies in Tyne and Wear
- List of parliamentary constituencies in North East England (region)
