= Virginia Surtees =

British art historian and author (1917–2017)

- Photograph of Virginia by Cecil Beaton, 1953
- Born: Virginia Bell; 9 January 1917; London, England
- Died: 22 September 2017 (aged 100); London, England
- Occupation: Historian
- Spouses: Henry Ashley Clarke (m. 1937; div. 1960) David Craig (m. 1960; div. 1962)
- Relatives: Evangeline Bruce (sister); Sir James Dodds (stepfather); Sir Conyers Surtees (grandfather); Sir Patrick Ramsay (uncle)

Virginia Surtees (née Bell, formerly Virginia, Lady Clarke and Virginia Craig) (9 January 1917 – 22 September 2017) was a British art historian and author.

== Early life ==
Born in London on 9 January 1917, she was the second daughter of American diplomat Edward Bell (1882–1924) and his second wife, English heiress Etelka Bertha (née Surtees) Bell, whom Virginia did not like. Her elder sister, Evangeline, later married the American diplomat David K. E. Bruce. Her father, who was involved in the reception in 1917 of the Zimmermann telegram, died in Peking while serving as the acting British Minister to China (when Minister Jacob Gould Schurman was back in Washington) in 1924. After the death of her father in 1924, her mother remarried to Sir James Leishman Dodds, a British career diplomat who served as the British Minister to Bolivia, Cuba and the Ambassador to Peru. From her mother's second marriage, she had a younger half-sister, Josephine Leishman Dodds, who married Squadron Leader Hugh Glyn Laurence Arthur Brooking, the King's Messenger, in 1949.

Her maternal grandparents were Brig. Gen. Sir Herbert Conyers Surtees and the former Madeleine Augusta Crabbe (a daughter of Edward Crabbe and Ruth Herbert, artist's model to the English poet and painter Dante Gabriel Rossetti, of whom Virginia later wrote a catalogue of his drawings and watercolours). Her aunt Dorothy was married to Sir Patrick Ramsay, the second son of John Ramsay, 13th Earl of Dalhousie and a brother-in-law of Princess Patricia of Connaught (through her husband Sir Alexander Ramsay), a granddaughter of Queen Victoria. On her father's side, she was a grand-niece of the publisher James Gordon Bennett Jr.

When Virginia was young, the family lived in Beijing, and then according to her step-father's international movements.

== Career ==
After her divorces and as an heiress living in London, she concentrated on research in art history, publishing several books and editing several others. Her books included a biography of George Howard, 9th Earl of Carlisle, and his wife, Rosalind Howard, Countess of Carlisle, a biography of Louisa Baring, Lady Ashburton, the Scottish art collector and philanthropist, and a book about the friendship of art critic John Ruskin and Pauline, Lady Trevelyan.

== Personal life ==
On June 15, 1937, Virginia Bell married the diplomat Henry Ashley Clarke in Tokyo. Clarke was a son of Dr. and Mrs. H. H. R. Clarke of Kent. During their marriage, he was posted to Lisbon and Paris, before he was knighted KCMG in the Queen's Birthday Honours of 1952, and in 1953 became the British Ambassador to Italy in Rome. In 1956, she met David Craig, the general manager in Italy for the British European Airways and began an affair which led to Lady Clarke divorcing Sir Ashley in 1960. She remarried to Craig, but the marriage ended after two years.

Virginia was photographed by Cecil Beaton and was friendly with critic and biographer Percy Lubbock, writer Osbert Sitwell and essayist Max Beerbohm.

Upon the death of her grandmother, Lady Surtees, in 1948, Virginia inherited Mainsforth Hall and, in 1962, changed her surname to Surtees. Until 2014, she lived in a London flat overlooking Onslow Square in South Kensington. She sold her most important works at Christie's in 2014 and bequeathed others to the Victoria and Albert Museum, the Ashmolean Museum and the Fitzwilliam Museum.

Virginia Surtees spend the last years of her life in a Pimlico nursing home. She turned 100 in January 2017, but her health was poor by this point, and biographer Richard Dorment described her as "tired of living"; she eventually chose to stop eating and died on 22 September 2017. She was buried at Mainsforth.

== Selected publications ==
- Paintings and Drawings of Dante Gabriel Rossetti: A Catalogue Raisonne - 2 vols. (pub. Oxford University Press, 1971)
- Sublime & Instructive: Letters From John Ruskin To Louisa, Marchioness Of Waterford, Anna Blunden And Ellen Heaton - editor (Michael Joseph, 1972)
- Charlotte Canning: Lady in Waiting to Queen Victoria and Wife of the first Viceroy of India, 1817-61 (John Murray, 1975)
- A Beckford Inheritance: The Lady Lincoln Scandal (Michael Russell, 1977)
- Reflections of a Friendship: John Ruskin's Letters to Pauline Trevelyan, 1848-1866 - editor (George Allen & Unwin, 1979)
- The Diaries of George Price Boyce - editor (Real World, 1980)
- The Diary of Ford Madox Brown - editor (Yale University Press, 1981)
- The Ludovisi Goddess: Life of Louisa, Lady Ashburton (Michael Russell, 1984)
- Jane Welsh Carlyle (Michael Russell, 1986)
- Artist and the Autocrat: George and Rosalind Howard, Earl and Countess of Carlisle (Michael Russell, 1988)
- A Second Self: Letters of Harriet Granville, 1810-45 - editor (Michael Russell, 1990)
- Rossetti's Portraits of Elizabeth Siddal: A Catalogue of the Drawings and Watercolours (Scolar Press, 1991)
- Coutts Lindsay, 1824-1913 (Michael Russell, 1993)
- The Grace of Friendship: Horace Walpole and the Misses Berry - editor (Michael Russell, 1995)
- The Actress and the Brewer's Wife. Two Victorian Vignettes (Michael Russell, 1997)
