= Mark Ferguson (politician) =

British politician

Mark Ferguson MP
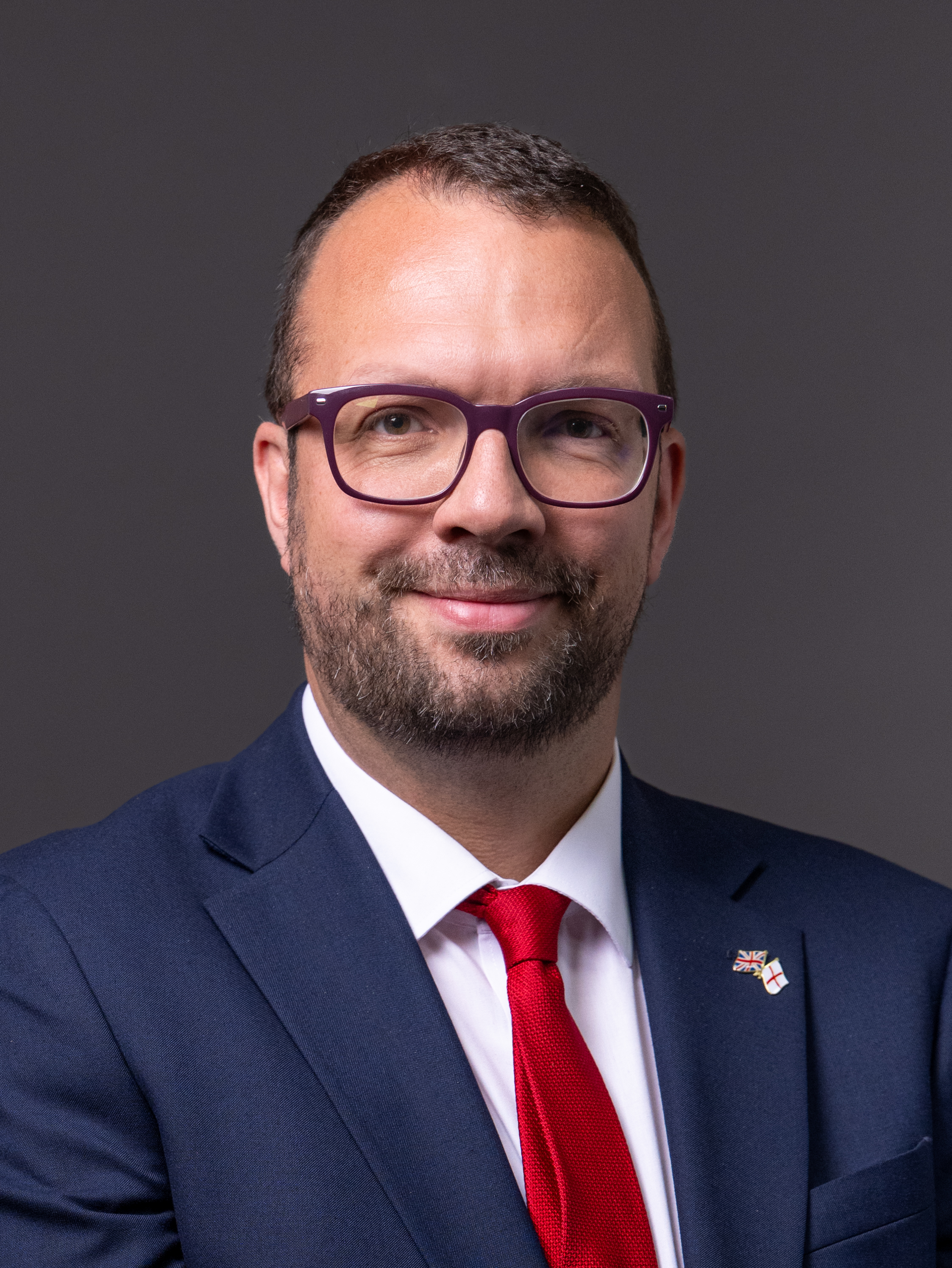
- Official portrait, 2026

Parliamentary Secretary for the Cabinet Office
- Incumbent
- Assumed office 22 July 2026
- Prime Minister: Andy Burnham

Member of Parliament for Gateshead Central and Whickham
- Incumbent
- Assumed office 4 July 2024
- Preceded by: New constituency
- Majority: 9,644 (24.0%)

Personal details
- Born: Mark Andrew Ferguson; 11 March 1985 (age 41) Gateshead, England
- Party: Labour
- Education: Robinson College, Cambridge
- Website: mark-ferguson.co.uk

Mark Andrew Ferguson (born 11 March 1985) is a British politician, journalist, and trade unionist. He became the Labour Member of Parliament (MP) for Gateshead Central and Whickham at the 2024 general election.

== Early life ==
Ferguson grew up in Gateshead, and attended Ryton Comprehensive School. He studied social and political science at Robinson College, Cambridge, and was President of the Cambridge University Students' Union (CUSU) from 2006 to 2007.

== Career ==
Ferguson has worked as a journalist and trade unionist. He is a former editor of the Labour-supportive website LabourList. Ferguson was a trade unionist representative on the National Executive Committee of the Labour Party.

Ferguson was selected as the prospective parliamentary candidate for Gateshead Central and Whickham, to succeed retiring Labour MP Ian Mearns (Gateshead). He won the constituency in the 2024 general election with a majority of 9,644 votes.

In the September 2025 cabinet reshuffle Ferguson was appointed to the ministerial position of assistant government whip.

Parliament of the United Kingdom
New constituency	Member of Parliament for Gateshead Central and Whickham; 2024–present	Incumbent
