= James Dodds (diplomat) =

British diplomat (1891–1972)

Sir James Dodds KCMG

British Ambassador to Peru
- In office 1949–1951
- Preceded by: Walter Roberts
- Succeeded by: Sir Oswald Scott

British Minister to Cuba
- In office 1943–1949
- Preceded by: Sir George Ogilvie-Forbes
- Succeeded by: Adrian Holman

British Minister to Bolivia
- In office 1940–1943
- Preceded by: Gordon Vereker
- Succeeded by: T. Ifor Rees

Personal details
- Born: James Leishman Dodds; 5 May 1891
- Died: 13 August 1972 (aged 81); Beckley, East Sussex, England
- Spouse: Etelka Surtees Bell (m. 1927)
- Children: 1
- Parent(s): Sir James Miller Dodds; Helen Picton Baumgarten
- Education: Marlborough College
- Alma mater: Oxford University

Sir James Leishman Dodds KCMG (5 May 1891 – 13 August 1972) was a British career diplomat who served in Madrid, Berne, Stockholm, The Hague, Tehran, Tokyo and as Minister to Bolivia, Minister to Cuba and lastly, as Ambassador to Peru.

== Early life ==
James Leishman Dodds was born on 5 May 1891. He was a son of Sir James Miller Dodds KCB (1861–1935) and the former Helen Picton Baumgarten. He had two sisters and a younger brother; Frances Jean Macalister Dodds (wife of Peter Hately Waddell), Helen Isobel Mackenzie Dodds, and Edward Anthony Charles Dodds.

His father, who served as Permanent Under-Secretary of State for Scotland from 1909 to 1921, was the second son of Rev. James Dodds, minister of the parish of Corstorphine, Scotland. His maternal grandparents were Capt. Edward Picton Baumgarten of the 10th Royal Hussars and Anna Isabella (née Mackenzie) Baumgarten.

Dodds entered Marlborough College in September 1904, before studying at Oxford University. While at Oxford, Dodds, Michael Nethersole, (later Commissioner for Indian Civil Service) another student were charged with being "drunk and disorderly" and with assault of a cinema attendant who threw them out of the Palace Cinema.

== Career ==
During World War I, Dodds served in the British Army, achieving the rank of Second Lieutenant, then Captain with the Royal Garrison Artillery. He entered the Foreign Office and throughout his career, he served all over the world, beginning as third Secretary and ending his career as an Ambassador.

In August 1937, as the British chargé d'affaires in Tokyo, he was tasked with delivering to Japans's Foreign Minister Kōki Hirota (and former Prime Minister), his government's official protest of a Japanese airman's wounding of Sir Hughe Knatchbull-Hugessen, the Britain's Ambassador to China. Hirota was later executed for war crimes committed during World War II in the Tokyo Trials. On 12 March 1938, he was appointed a Counsellor of Embassy in His Majesty's Diplomatic Service by the King.

From 1940 to 1943, during World War II, he served as the British Minister to Bolivia in La Paz. After his service in Bolivia, he was the Minister to Cuba in Havana from 1944 to 1949. While in Cuba, the family stayed in a two-story house in suburban Jaimanitas that overlooked a golf course and contained the Dodd's collection of Chinese art objects he had bought while stationed there. His last post was as the British Ambassador to Peru from 1949 to 1951.

== Personal life ==
On 7 July 1927, Dodds was married to Etelka Bertha (née Surtees) Bell (1891–1974) in Paris. Etelka, a daughter of Brig. Gen. Sir Herbert Conyers Surtees, was the widow of American diplomat Edward J. Bell, who died in Peking while serving as the acting British Minister to China in 1924. Her sister, Dorothy was married to Sir Patrick Ramsay, the second son of John Ramsay, 13th Earl of Dalhousie and a brother-in-law of Princess Patricia of Connaught (through her husband Sir Alexander Ramsay). From his wife Etelka's first marriage, he was a stepfather to Evangeline Bell (1914–1995), who married David K. E. Bruce (a son of U.S. Senator William Cabell Bruce, he served as the U.S. Ambassador to France, the Federal Republic of Germany, and the United Kingdom), and Virginia Bell (1917–2017), who married (and later divorced) Sir Henry Ashley Clarke, the British Ambassador to Italy. From their marriage, Etelka and James were the parents of one daughter:

- Josephine Leishman Dodds (b. 1928), who married the King's Messenger, Squadron Leader Hugh Glyn Laurence Arthur Brooking (1914–2000) in 1949. Brooking was a younger son of Hugh Cyril Arthur Brooking.

Sir James died on 13 August 1972 at Church House in Beckley.
