= Bobby Pattinson =

English comedian and actor (born 1935)

- Born: 21 July 1935 (age 91); Gateshead, England
- Presenting career
- Style: Comedian
- Country: United Kingdom

Bobby Pattinson (born 21 July 1935) is an English comedian and actor from Gateshead, Tyne and Wear.

== Career ==
Pattinson grew up in Gateshead, County Durham, now Tyne and Wear. His first appearance in comedy was at the Haswell Social Club in County Durham when he was just 13.

In 2015, Pattinson performed his final comedy show at the Customs House, South Shields.

In 2018, Pattinson helped to raised over £15,000 for Variety The Children's Charity. He hosted ‘The New Stars of North East Comedy Talent’ show at the Hilton Newcastle in Gateshead, despite having fractured his back in a fall.

== Awards ==
In July 2023, Pattinson was awarded Freedom of the Borough of Gateshead, for his contribution to charity, business and entertainment in the town.
