= John Dickie (British politician) =

British politician (1874–1963)

John Purcell Dickie (born 14 July 1874 – 1963) was a Liberal Party (later National Liberal) politician in the United Kingdom.

At the 1922 general election, he contested the Gateshead constituency, coming third. However, in 1923 he won the seat, but was Member of Parliament (MP) for Gateshead for less than a year, losing the seat at the general election in October 1924. He did not contest Gateshead again, but stood unsuccessfully in the Darlington by-election in 1926 and at Consett in 1929.

When the Liberal Party split over participation in the Conservative-dominated National Government, Dickie joined the breakaway National Liberals, and was elected at the 1931 general election as National Liberal MP for Consett. He was defeated at the 1935 general election, and did not stand again.

Parliament of the United Kingdom
Preceded by John Brotherton	Member of Parliament for Gateshead; 1923–1924	Succeeded by John Beckett
Preceded by Herbert Dunnico	Member of Parliament for Consett; 1931–1935	Succeeded by David Adams
