= 1931 Gateshead by-election =

UK parliamentary by-election

The 1931 Gateshead by-election was a parliamentary by-election held on 8 June 1931 for the British House of Commons constituency of Gateshead.

== Previous MP ==
The seat had become vacant on when the constituency's Labour Member of Parliament (MP), Sir James Melville, had died on 1 May, aged 46. He had been Gateshead's MP since the 1929 general election, and had been Solicitor-General from 1929 to 1930.

== Candidates ==
The Conservative Party candidate was Cuthbert Headlam, who had been MP for Barnard Castle from 1924 until his defeat in 1929. Labour selected Herbert Evans, who had stood unsuccessfully at the 1929 election in the Maldon constituency in Essex.

In 1929, there had been both a Liberal and an independent candidate in Gateshead, but the by-election was a two-way contest between Labour and Conservative.

== Result ==
The result was a narrow victory for Evans. His 51.6% share of the votes was only a small fall from his predecessor's result in 1929, but Headlam picked up the votes which had previously gone to Liberal and independent candidates, and cut the Labour majority from a safe 31.1% to a precarious 3.2%.

However, Evans did not live to defend the seat; he died on 7 October, the day on which Parliament was dissolved for the 1931 general election. The Gateshead seat was then won by the National Liberal Party candidate, Thomas Magnay, and Headlam was re-elected in Barnard Castle.

Gateshead by-election, 8 June 1931
Party	Candidate	Votes	%	±%
Labour	Herbert Evans	22,893	51.6	−1.0
Conservative	Cuthbert Headlam	21,501	48.4	+26.9
Majority		1,392	3.2	−27.9
Turnout		44,394	60.8	−13.1
Labour hold		Swing		

== See also ==
- Gateshead constituency
- Gateshead
- List of United Kingdom by-elections (1918–1931)
- United Kingdom by-election records
