= John Beckett (politician) =

British politician

- Beckett in 1929

Member of Parliament for Gateshead
- In office 29 October 1924 – 10 May 1929
- Preceded by: John Purcell Dickie
- Succeeded by: James Melville

Member of Parliament for Peckham
- In office 30 May 1929 – 7 October 1931
- Preceded by: Hugh Dalton
- Succeeded by: Viscount Borodale

Personal details
- Born: John Warburton Beckett; 11 October 1894 London, England
- Died: 28 December 1964 (aged 70) London, England
- Party: Independent Labour Party, British Union of Fascists, National Socialist League, British People's Party
- Children: Francis Beckett, Clare Beckett-Wrighton.
- Occupation: soldier, politician

John Warburton Beckett (11 October 1894 – 28 December 1964) was a British politician who was a Labour Party MP from 1924 to 1931. During the 1930s, he joined the fascist movement, first in the British Union of Fascists and later as founder of the National Socialist League and the British People's Party.

During World War II, Beckett was interned after being implicated in a fascist plot against the British government. Of three such plots revealed by MI5, Beckett's plan was described as the most politically developed. Beckett said he had plans to set up a Quisling government if and when Britain was conquered by Germany.

== Early life ==
Beckett was born in Hammersmith, London, the son of William Beckett, a draper, and his wife Dorothy (née Salmon), who had been born into Judaism but abandoned the faith to marry Beckett. According to his son Francis, he was christened Jack William Beckett but assumed the name John Warburton Beckett in 1918.

He was educated at Latymer Upper School until the age of 14 when his father lost all his money in a scheme run by notorious swindler Horatio Bottomley and could no longer afford the fees; as a result the young John was forced to work as an errand boy. On the outbreak of the First World War, he enlisted in the Middlesex Regiment before being transferred to the King's Shropshire Light Infantry soon afterwards. He was invalided out of the army in 1916 because of a heart defect.

Beckett claimed however, on one occasion publicly, that he was invalided because of a wound received in the Balkans in 1917. (Source PRO KV2 1519 File on him for subversive activity).

== Early career ==
Beckett founded the National Union of Ex-Servicemen in 1918 to look after the needs of the war veterans (although it was eventually absorbed into the later Royal British Legion having failed to gain Labour Party recognition). At this time, he also joined the Independent Labour Party, sitting on Hackney Council from 1919 to 1922.

Beckett first stood for Parliament at the 1923 general election but failed to be elected for Newcastle upon Tyne North. He became the Labour MP for Gateshead in 1924, moving to Peckham in 1929, after which he served as an ILP whip. In these early years, Beckett was considered a close ally of Clement Attlee, alongside whom he had worked as a Labour Party agent before his election to Parliament. He gained attention in 1930 when he lifted the Ceremonial mace during a Commons debate over the suspension of Fenner Brockway and it had to be wrested away from him at the door.

As a campaigner, Beckett was known for his fiery, passionate speeches. Beckett opposed Ramsay MacDonald's formation of the National Government and returned to the ILP fold in 1931, failing to hold his seat, with the vote split between three "Labour" candidates. Retiring from active politics, he visited Italy where he was impressed by the corporate state that had been set up.

== Fascism ==
Beckett joined the British Union of Fascists (BUF) in 1934 and before long had risen through the party to become Director of Publications and served as an editor of both BUF publications, Action and Blackshirt, for a time. He was arrested outside Buckingham Palace during the Edward VIII abdication crisis and was the only BUF activist to win a court case against its opponents by securing £1,000 in damages in a slander suit against an antifascist organisation although it disbanded before payment was collected. Beckett, however, struggled to reconnect with his former supporters on the left and in 1934 when he returned to Gateshead and Newcastle upon Tyne for speaking engagements he was met with large hostile crowds and shouts of "Traitor". He was forced to cancel one such speaking engagement near Newcastle on 13 May 1934 when a crowd of around 1,000 antifascists rushed the stage on which he was due to speak.

After initial successes, the BUF began to founder and to devolve into two factions, a militarist one led by Neil Francis Hawkins and F. M. Box, and a more political one that hoped to convert the masses to fascism under Beckett and William Joyce. In 1937, Oswald Mosley sacked Beckett from his salaried position, in part because of a lack of funds but also because of Mosley's increasing support for the Hawkins wing. Beckett soon returned to politics by forming the National Socialist League along with William Joyce, but his membership did not last long as he left the League in 1938, disillusioned by Hitler and arguing that Joyce was being too extremist in his public anti-Semitic outbursts.

While a leading figure in the League, he was also prominent in the British Council Against European Commitments, an attempt by Viscount Lymington to establish an umbrella movement of right-wingers opposed to war with Germany. He continued his close association with Lymington after his departure from the League, and the pair launched a journal, The New Pioneer, which tended to reflect a strong antisemitic and pro-German worldview. He left the journal in mid-1939 to become Honorary Secretary of the British People's Party (BPP), a newly-established party controlled by Lord Tavistock (later the Duke of Bedford). After the outbreak of war, he became secretary of the British Council for Christian Settlement in Europe, a group that sought a swift peace settlement. The group had 1,500 members, 300 in London and 1,200 in the provinces.

An investigation by MI5 revealed the group to be a fifth columnist organization. According to a report:

"Beckett has stated that he is making intensive efforts to obtain contacts in H.M. Forces in order that when the time is ripe there [sic] persons will – to quote Beckett's actual words – 'turn their rifles in the right direction'."

According to a letter to Tavistock in 1940, Beckett said he was planning to set up a "Coalition Government of National Security" if and when Britain was invaded:

"I have had a series of conversations with key people who realize the situation and there is a general consensus of opinion that you are the only person around whom we could build an alternative government in time. I cannot say more than this by letter and have probably said too much, but I consider it vitally necessary that you should be here as soon as possible for consultation with various people."

According to Beckett, he would be the Home Secretary and minister for "National Security", Tavistock would be Prime Minister, Oswald Mosley would be the Leader of the House and the "President of Council", Robert Gordon-Canning would be placed in control of all British Dominions, Lord Lymington would be the Secretary of Food and Agriculture, and the Duke of Buccleuch would take charge of the War Office. Numerous senior members of the Right Club were given junior ministerial posts. Beckett said retired general J. F. C. Fuller would be his Minister of Defence, and expected Fuller's friend Edmund Ironside, whom he believed to be a closeted fascist sympathiser, to support his coup. Overall, Beckett listed 39 puppet government ministers, 32 of whom were already under watch by MI5.

Beckett was one of the leading fascists and rightists to be interned under Defence Regulation 18b during the Second World War. He spent his internment in HM Prison Brixton, an internment camp on the Isle of Man and then back in Brixton and was moved each time after he had clashed with BUF members with whom he was imprisoned. While imprisoned, Beckett received instruction from a Catholic chaplain and subsequently converted to Catholicism. He was released before the end of the war on account of ill health.

Beckett's son Francis considers that his father came out of prison far more racist and, in particular, antisemitic than he went in, as was common after detention, and he had internalised his rage. On his release, Beckett, not allowed to live within 20 miles of London or to travel more than five miles from his home, reactivated the BPP and represented the group in talks with A. K. Chesterton, who had organised a group that he called "National Front After Victory" in the hopes of developing a united far-right group that could contest the first postwar election. The scheme was not a success, and Beckett rejected the merger.

== Postwar activity ==
After the war, Beckett and his wife were under constant surveillance by intelligence agency MI5 until at least 1955, with their movements followed and telephone conversations recorded. Just after the war, Beckett found administrative employment at a hospital but was dismissed on the secret instigation of the MI5 officer in charge of the case, Graham Mitchell. He was unable to find the "quiet, normal job" that his wife hoped for. The only work he could get was being paid to run the neofascist British People's Party by its patron, the Duke of Bedford.

Beckett's first postwar role was in leading a campaign for clemency for his erstwhile colleague William Joyce, also known as Lord Haw-Haw, who was facing a death sentence for treason. The campaign was not a success, and Joyce was executed. In 1946, Beckett co-operated with a young Colin Jordan and gave him a seat on the BPP national council, but the association was short-lived as Jordan soon made Arnold Leese his mentor.

In 1953, the Duke of Bedford died, and the BPP, which he had funded, was wound up. Beckett's income ceased (he was salaried as BPP leader), and the new Duke, who did not share his father's politics, moved to evict Beckett from his home on the family's estate. Beckett started a stock exchange tip magazine called Advice and Information and eventually bought Thurlwood House, where he had been living, from the estate trustees in 1958.

Having sold the house and returned to London in 1962, Beckett was diagnosed with stomach cancer in 1963. He survived until the following year and died on 28 December. He was cremated.

== Personal life ==
The Beckett family had originated from rural Cheshire. His mother was the daughter of a Jewish jeweller, whose family refused to attend the wedding. Whilst in the army, Beckett met Helen Shaw, and married her four days later. The couple had a daughter Lesley, but split in the mid 1920s due to Beckett's infidelity.

His second wife was Kyrle Bellew, a stage actress from a well-known acting dynasty. Their marital life was short-lived, but Bellew refused to divorce Beckett even though they lived apart for eighteen years.

He subsequently lived with Anne Cutmore, and their son Francis Beckett was born in 1945; they married in 1963. Cutmore was for a time secretary to Robert Forgan at BUF headquarters.

== Media portrayals ==
In the 2026 film Peaky Blinders: The Immortal Man, Beckett is played by Tim Roth. The film was criticised by Beckett's family, who claimed he had been portrayed as a "one-dimensional villain" and noted that the real Beckett was interned at the time the film takes place.

Parliament of the United Kingdom
| Preceded by John Purcell Dickie | Member of Parliament for Gateshead; 1924–1929 | Succeeded by Sir James Melville |
| Preceded by Hugh Dalton | Member of Parliament for Peckham; 1929–1931 | Succeeded by Viscount Borodale |
