= James Melville (politician) =

British politician

Sir James Benjamin Melville KC (20 April 1885 – 1 May 1931) was a British Labour Party politician and government minister, and earlier a successful barrister, who died aged 46, five months before Labour's major defeat in the 1931 general election.

== Private life and importance in the Labour Party with Sarah Tugander ==
James Melville was born at Le Havre, France, son of William Melville, from County Kerry, Ireland, who was stationed there on Intelligence work, and Kate O'Reilly. He married Sarah Tugander, formerly Conservative Prime Minister Bonar Law's private secretary. They were said to be the 'real founders' of the Labour Party in the 'difficult area' of South Kensington, despite his having first started as a Liberal. He died while Solicitor General (as a government MP) on 1 May 1931, aged 46. He was buried at Kensal Green Cemetery in London.

== Legal career ==
As barrister in 1911 he had successfully defended the anarchists Yourka Dubof and Jacob Peters who were allegedly involved in the Sidney Street siege (also known as the Houndsditch murders) which so embarrassed Winston Churchill. According to Donald Rumbelow's The Siege of Sidney Street, Peters was guilty, but the prosecution's case was a shambles. Peters later returned to Russia to play a leading part in the Bolshevik revolution; he became deputy director of the Cheka and worked with Lenin and Dzerzhinsky.

His legal career was odd, considering the number of anarchists that his father, William Melville, had apprehended and his emergent role in counter-intelligence.

Sir James also, albeit unsuccessfully, acted in appeal against the obscenity criminal verdict which included a censorship order against The Well of Loneliness by Radclyffe Hall. When he took silk he was the youngest KC in England, a record he held for many years.

== War service ==
He served in World War I as an officer in the Army Service Corps, including in Gallipoli and Macedonia from the first day to the last, was mentioned in despatches, and ended the war as a Major at GHQ Staff. Shortly after the Armistice he was gazetted out of the Army at 50% disability. His obituary in The Law Journal states:

'His ill health in the last years and his early death were the belated toll exacted by his service in during the war in which he fought with the same placid courage which distinguished him in peace.'

== Political career ==
He was elected at the 1929 general election as Member of Parliament (MP) for Gateshead, a Labour Party safe seat where he won over 50% of the votes. At his posthumous Gateshead by-election on 8 June, Herbert Evans held the seat for Labour, but died in office on 7 October, the day when Parliament was dissolved for the 1931 general election.

In Ramsay MacDonald's Second Labour Government, he was Solicitor General for England and Wales from 1929 to 1930.

Parliament of the United Kingdom
Preceded by John Beckett	Member of Parliament for Gateshead; 1929–1931	Succeeded by Herbert Evans
Legal offices
Preceded by Frank Merriman	Solicitor General for England and Wales; 1929–1930	Succeeded by Stafford Cripps
