= Enslin =

Enslin is a surname. Notable people with the surname include:

- Eduard Enslin, German ophthalmologist and entomologist
- Frederick Gotthold Enslin, Continental Army officer convicted of sodomy in 1778
- Johan H. Enslin, South African electrical engineer
- Theodore Enslin, American poet

== See also ==
- Battle of Enslin in the Second Boer War
- Joubert v Enslin, an important case in South African contract law
