= Evangeline Bruce =

American hostess and writer

- Born: Evangeline Bell; November 27, 1914
- Died: December 12, 1995 (aged 81); Washington, D.C., U.S.
- Resting place: Oak Hill Cemetery; Washington, D.C., U.S.
- Education: Radcliffe College
- Spouse: David K. E. Bruce (m. 1945; died 1977)
- Children: 3
- Relatives: Virginia Surtees (sister); Sir James Dodds (stepfather); Sir Conyers Surtees (grandfather); Sir Patrick Ramsay (uncle)

Evangeline Bruce (née Bell) (November 27, 1914 – December 12, 1995) was an American society hostess and writer.

== Early life ==
Evangeline was born on November 27, 1914. She was the eldest of two daughters born to Etelka Bertha (née Surtees) Bell (1891–1974) and American diplomat Edward J. Bell. Her father died in Peking while serving as the acting British Minister to China (when Minister Jacob Gould Schurman was back in Washington) in 1924. Her younger sister Virginia, married (and later divorced) Sir Henry Ashley Clarke, the British Ambassador to Italy.

After the death of her father in 1924, her mother remarried to Sir James Leishman Dodds, a British career diplomat who served as the British Minister to Bolivia, Cuba and the Ambassador to Peru. From her mother's second marriage, she had a younger half-sister, Josephine Leishman Dodds, who married Squadron Leader Hugh Glyn Laurence Arthur Brooking, the King's Messenger, in 1949.

Her maternal grandfather was Brig. Gen. Sir Herbert Conyers Surtees. Her aunt Dorothy was married to Sir Patrick Ramsay, the second son of John Ramsay, 13th Earl of Dalhousie and a brother-in-law of Princess Patricia of Connaught (through her husband Sir Alexander Ramsay). On her father's side, she was a grand-niece of the publisher James Gordon Bennett Jr.

By the time she began attending Radcliffe College in Cambridge, Massachusetts, in 1937 to study Chinese history and French literature, she had lived in a dozen countries and spoke Italian, German, French, Japanese and Chinese.

== Career ==
In 1942, during World War II, she was recruited and moved to London to work for the American Office of Strategic Services, the predecessor of the Central Intelligence Agency, where she met her husband, who was appointed the head of the London headquarters by General William J. Donovan.

During David's long career, he worked for every U.S. President from Harry S. Truman to Gerald R. Ford in various capacities, including as the U.S. Ambassador to France, the Ambassador to the Federal Republic of Germany in Bonn, and the Ambassador to the United Kingdom. In Paris, they lived in an apartment which had belonged to the Princesse de Lamballe in the rue de Lille before Bruce became the Ambassador and they moved into the Ambassador's residence.

Evangeline "was known for her legendary soirees at their Georgetown home, at once properly old-fashioned and glitteringly up to the minute. Jacqueline Kennedy Onassis once sent her a note praising "the bright path you cut through an age where so few people have grace and imagination and the virtues of another time." She was known for her many friendships with prominent people around the world, including with Marie-Louise Bousquet, Marietta Peabody Tree, Ludovic and Moira Kennedy, Lord and Lady Jenkins of Hillhead, Sir Nicholas and Lady Henderson, Lord and Lady Weidenfeld, Edna O'Brien, Katharine Graham, Vernon E. Jordan, David Brinkley, Arthur Schlesinger Jr., and Arianna Huffington, among others. Evangeline was referred to as "one of the best-dressed women in the world" and when she was pregnant in France, Christian Dior created a special set of maternity clothes for her.

In the 1970s, she organized Sasha Bruce Youthwork Inc., a Washington organization for runaways and abused teenagers that was named for her daughter who was shot to death by her husband on the family estate in Virginia in 1975.

=== Writing career ===
While in China for 18 months in 1973, when her husband was Chief of the U.S. Liaison Office to the People's Republic of China in Beijing, she began writing a book about the year 1798 in France. She finished the book in the 1990s and it was published by Lisa Drew at Scribner's as Napoleon and Josephine: An Improbable Marriage in 1995. In a review in The New York Times Book Review, her novel was called "an extremely readable account of their lives together, and an easy and attractive introduction to Napoleon and his private life."

== Personal life ==
On April 23, 1945, three days after his divorce from his first wife, Evangeline was married to David K. E. Bruce at the Lindsey Memorial Chapel in Boston. She was given away by her uncle, Harold W. Bell. Bruce, a son of U.S. Senator William Cabell Bruce and brother of Ambassador James Cabell Bruce, was previously married to Ailsa Mellon (daughter of the banker and diplomat Andrew W. Mellon) who was considered the wealthiest woman in America. Together, Evangeline and David were the parents of three children:

- Alexandra "Sasha" Bruce (1946–1975), who married Greek businessman Marios Michaelides in 1975 and died that year in still-undetermined circumstances.
- David Surtees Bruce (1948–2008)
- Nicholas Cabell Bruce (b. 1951).

Bruce purchased and restored Staunton Hill, the Bruce family's former estate in Charlotte County, Virginia. Her husband's only daughter from his first marriage, Audrey Bruce (1934–1967), and her husband, Stephen Currier, were presumed dead when a plane in which they were flying in the Caribbean disappeared on January 17, 1967. In 1968, her husband's first wife donated $5,000,000 to Radcliffe in memory of Audrey.

Her husband died in Washington on December 5, 1977. Evangeline died at her home in Washington, D.C., on December 12, 1995. She was buried alongside her husband at Oak Hill Cemetery in Washington.
