= John Johnson (British politician) =

John Johnson MP, circa 1906

John Johnson (1850 – 29 December 1910) was a British trade unionist and Lib-Lab politician.

== Trade Unionist ==
He worked in the mining industry. In 1890 he became Treasurer of the Durham Miners' Association and then in 1897 their Financial Secretary.

== Politician ==
In 1904, following the death of the Gateshead Liberal MP, William Allan, Johnson, though a member of the Independent Labour Party, was selected as Liberal candidate to defend the predominantly mining seat at a by-election. He won the election and joined the Liberal-Labour trade union group, as a miners union sponsored MP.

In 1906 he was re-elected at the General Election.

General election 1906 Electorate 18,614
Party	Candidate	Votes	%	±%
Liberal	John Johnson	9,651	65.3	
Liberal Unionist	Sir Theodore Vivian Samuel Angier	5,126	34.7	
Majority		4,525	30.6	
Turnout			79.4	
Liberal hold		Swing		

In 1909, when the Miners Federation of Great Britain affiliated to the Labour party he was required to cross the floor to sit as a Labour MP. He was also required to seek re-election at the next general election as a Labour candidate.

In 1910, he contested the January General Election as a Labour candidate but was opposed by a Liberal candidate, Harold Elverston. Johnson was a supporter of the Coal Mines Regulation Act 1908 (8 Edw. 7. c. 57) – the 'Eight Hours Act' – which brought him opposition from many miners in Gateshead. Johnson finished in third place as the Liberals re-gained the seat.

General election January 1910 Electorate 19,138
Party	Candidate	Votes	%	±%
Liberal	Harold Elverston	6,800	40.7	+40.7
Liberal Unionist	Nicholas Grattan-Doyle	6,323	37.9	+3.2
Labour	John Johnson	3,572	21.4	−43.9
Majority		477	2.8	
Turnout			87.2	+7.8
Liberal gain from Labour		Swing	+42.3	

He died in December 1910 at the age of 60 in Durham, England.

Parliament of the United Kingdom
Preceded by William Allan	Member of Parliament for Gateshead; 1904–1910	Succeeded by Harold Elverston
Trade union offices
Preceded by William Hammond Patterson?	Treasurer of the Durham Miners' Association; 1890–1896	Succeeded by Thomas Cann
