= Gateshead (constituency) =

UK Parliament constituency (1832–1950; 2010–2024)

- Former borough constituency for the House of Commons
- 2010–2024 boundary of Gateshead in Tyne and Wear

- Location of Tyne and Wear within England
- County: Tyne and Wear
- Electorate: 66,066 (December 2010)
- Major settlements: Gateshead

2010–2024
- Seats: One
- Created from: Gateshead East and Washington West, and Tyne Bridge
- Replaced by: Gateshead Central and Whickham

1832–1950
- Seats: One
- Type of constituency: Borough constituency
- Created from: County Durham
- Replaced by: Gateshead East and Gateshead West

Gateshead was a constituency (Note: A borough constituency (for the purposes of election expenses and type of returning officer)) most recently represented in the House of Commons of the UK Parliament since it was re-established in 2010 until its abolition for the 2024 general election by Ian Mearns of the Labour Party. (Note: As with all current constituencies, the constituency elects one Member of Parliament (MP) by the first past the post system of election at least every five years.)

Under the 2023 review of Westminster constituencies, the majority of the constituency was included in the new seat of Gateshead Central and Whickham, with the Felling, and Windy Nook and Whitehills wards being added to the new constituency of Jarrow and Gateshead East.

== History ==
=== First creation ===
The seat was first created by the Reform Act 1832 as a single-member parliamentary borough. It was abolished under the Representation of the People Act 1948 for the 1950 general election and split into Gateshead East and Gateshead West.

=== Revival ===
As a result of the Boundary Commission's Fifth periodic review of Westminster constituencies, the seat was re-established for the 2010 general election, combining over half of the electorates of both of the abolished constituencies of Gateshead East and Washington West, and Tyne Bridge.

== Boundaries ==
Map of boundaries 2010–2024

=== 1832–1918 ===
Under the Parliamentary Boundaries Act 1832, the contents of the borough were defined as the Parish of Gateshead and part of the Chapelry of Heworth in the Parish of Jarrow.

See map on Vision of Britain website.

=== 1918–1950 ===
- The County Borough of Gateshead.

No change to boundaries.

=== 2010–2024 ===
- The Metropolitan Borough of Gateshead wards of Bridges, Chowdene, Deckham, Dunston and Teams, Felling, High Fell, Lobley Hill and Bensham, Low Fell, Saltwell, and Windy Nook and Whitehills.

== Constituency profile ==
Under the current boundaries, the constituency is overwhelmingly White, and working-class; with 95% of its electorate identifying as White British and being in the top decile of constituencies for routine work. The area's politics are influenced by these demographics; with the exception of Low Fell, all of the wards that make up the constituency are safely Labour areas, and the constituency voted overwhelmingly to leave the European Union, like the borough as a whole.

== Members of Parliament ==
Among famous representatives are James Melville KC who was Solicitor General for England and Wales before he died, while holding the seat, and international statesman Konni Zilliacus who assisted in creating peaceful bilateral relations during the Cold War, including though work at the United Nations.

=== MPs 1832–1950 ===
Election	Member	Party
1832	Cuthbert Rippon	Radical
1841	Sir William Hutt	Radical
1859	Sir William Hutt	Liberal
1874	Walter James	Liberal
1893	Sir William Allan	Liberal
1904	John Johnson	Liberal
1910	Sir Harold Elverston	Liberal
1918	Herbert Surtees	Coalition Conservative
1922	John Brotherton	Labour
1923	John Dickie	Liberal
1924	John Beckett	Labour
1929	Sir James Melville	Labour
1931	Herbert Evans	Labour
1931	Thomas Magnay	National Liberal
1945	Konni Zilliacus	Labour (1945–49); Labour Independent Group (1949); Independent Labour (1949–50)
1950	Constituency abolished	

=== MPs since 2010 ===
Election	Member	Party
2010	Ian Mearns	Labour
2024	Constituency abolished	

== Elections results 2010–2019 ==
=== Elections in the 2010s ===
General election 2010: Gateshead
Party	Candidate	Votes	%	±%
Labour	Ian Mearns	20,712	54.1	−7.3
Liberal Democrats	Frank Hindle	8,163	21.3	+0.6
Conservative	Hazel Anderson	5,716	14.9	+4.8
BNP	Kevin Scott	1,787	4.7	+1.6
UKIP	John Tennant	1,103	2.9	−0.4
Green	Andy Redfern	379	1.0	New
TUSC	Elaine Brunskill	266	0.7	New
Christian	David Walton	131	0.3	New
Majority		12,549	32.8	−7.9
Turnout		38,257	57.5	+3.8
Labour hold		Swing		

General election 2015: Gateshead
Party	Candidate	Votes	%	±%
Labour	Ian Mearns	21,549	56.8	+2.7
UKIP	John Tennant	6,765	17.8	+14.9
Conservative	Thomas Smith	5,502	14.5	−0.4
Liberal Democrats	Frank Hindle	2,585	6.8	−14.5
Green	Andy Redfern	1,548	4.1	+3.1
Majority		14,784	39.0	+6.2
Turnout		37,949	59.4	+1.9
Labour hold		Swing		

General election 2017: Gateshead
Party	Candidate	Votes	%	±%
Labour	Ian Mearns	27,426	65.1	+8.3
Conservative	Lauren Hankinson	10,076	23.9	+9.4
UKIP	Mark Bell	2,281	5.4	−12.4
Liberal Democrats	Frank Hindle	1,709	4.1	−2.7
Green	Andy Redfern	611	1.5	−2.6
Majority		17,350	41.2	+2.2
Turnout		42,103	64.6	+5.2
Labour hold		Swing	−0.5	

General election 2019: Gateshead
Party	Candidate	Votes	%	±%
Labour	Ian Mearns	20,450	53.6	−11.5
Conservative	Jane MacBean	13,250	34.7	+10.8
Liberal Democrats	Peter Maughan	2,792	7.3	+3.2
Green	Rachael Cabral	1,653	4.3	+2.8
Majority		7,200	18.9	−22.3
Turnout		38,145	59.2	−5.4
Labour hold		Swing	−11.2	

== Election results 1832–1950 ==
=== Elections in the 1830s ===
General election 1832: Gateshead
Party	Candidate	Votes	%
Radical	Cuthbert Rippon	Unopposed	
Registered electors		454	
Radical win (new seat)			

General election 1835: Gateshead
Party	Candidate	Votes	%
Radical	Cuthbert Rippon	Unopposed	
Registered electors		506	
Radical hold			

General election 1837: Gateshead
Party	Candidate	Votes	%
Radical	Cuthbert Rippon	236	61.0
Radical	John William Williamson	151	39.0
Majority		85	22.0
Turnout		387	72.5
Registered electors		534	
Radical hold			

=== Elections in the 1840s ===
General election 1841: Gateshead
Party	Candidate	Votes	%	±%
Radical	William Hutt	Unopposed		
Registered electors		554		
Radical hold				

General election 1847: Gateshead
Party	Candidate	Votes	%	±%
Radical	William Hutt	Unopposed		
Registered electors		656		
Radical hold				

=== Elections in the 1850s ===
General election 1852: Gateshead
Party	Candidate	Votes	%	±%
Radical	William Hutt	270	45.3	N/A
Conservative	Adolphus Frederick Octavius Liddell	190	31.9	New
Independent Liberal	Ralph Walters	136	22.8	New
Majority		80	13.4	N/A
Turnout		596	83.8	N/A
Registered electors		711		
Radical hold				

General election 1857: Gateshead
Party	Candidate	Votes	%	±%
Radical	William Hutt	Unopposed		
Registered electors		895		
Radical hold				

General election 1859: Gateshead
Party	Candidate	Votes	%	±%
Liberal	William Hutt	Unopposed		
Registered electors		913		
Liberal hold				

=== Elections in the 1860s ===
By-election, 13 February 1860: Gateshead
Party	Candidate	Votes	%	±%
Liberal	William Hutt	Unopposed		
Liberal hold				

- Caused by Hutt's appointment as Vice-President of the Board of Trade.

General election 1865: Gateshead
Party	Candidate	Votes	%	±%
Liberal	William Hutt	Unopposed		
Registered electors		1,165		
Liberal hold				

General election 1868: Gateshead
Party	Candidate	Votes	%	±%
Liberal	William Hutt	2,442	63.5	N/A
Independent Liberal	William Arbuthnot	1,406	36.5	New
Majority		1,036	27.0	N/A
Turnout		3,848	69.0	N/A
Registered electors		5,578		
Liberal hold		Swing	N/A	

=== Elections in the 1870s ===
General election 1874: Gateshead
Party	Candidate	Votes	%	±%
Liberal	Walter James	4,250	75.1	+11.6
Conservative	Richard Forster	1,396	24.7	New
Independent Liberal	William Arbuthnot	12	0.2	−36.3
Majority		2,854	50.4	+23.4
Turnout		5,658	57.8	−11.2
Registered electors		9,782		
Liberal hold		Swing	+24.0	

- Arbuthnot retired from the race the day before polling.

=== Elections in the 1880s ===
General election 1880: Gateshead
Party	Candidate	Votes	%	±%
Liberal	Walter James	5,749	78.5	+3.4
Conservative	Gainsford Bruce	1,570	21.5	−3.2
Majority		4,179	57.0	+6.6
Turnout		7,319	63.4	+5.6
Registered electors		11,551		
Liberal hold		Swing	+3.2	

General election 1885: Gateshead
Party	Candidate	Votes	%	±%
Liberal	Walter James	5,756	65.6	−12.9
Conservative	James Henry Bottomley	3,024	34.4	+12.9
Majority		2,732	31.2	−25.8
Turnout		8,780	66.5	+3.1
Registered electors		13,206		
Liberal hold		Swing	−12.9	

General election 1886: Gateshead
Party	Candidate	Votes	%	±%
Liberal	Walter James	Unopposed		
Liberal hold				

=== Elections in the 1890s ===
General election 1892: Gateshead
Party	Candidate	Votes	%	±%
Liberal	Walter James	5,336	51.4	N/A
Liberal Unionist	Pandeli Ralli	5,043	48.5	New
Majority		293	2.9	N/A
Turnout		10,379	76.4	N/A
Registered electors		13,581		
Liberal hold		Swing	N/A	

By-election, 1893: Gateshead
Party	Candidate	Votes	%	±%
Liberal	William Allan	6,434	53.6	+2.2
Liberal Unionist	Pandeli Ralli	5,566	46.4	−2.1
Majority		868	7.2	+4.3
Turnout		12,000	85.2	+8.8
Registered electors		14,090		
Liberal hold		Swing	+2.2	

- Caused by James' succession to the peerage as Lord Northbourne.

General election 1895: Gateshead
Party	Candidate	Votes	%	±%
Liberal	William Allan	6,137	52.0	+0.6
Liberal Unionist	J. Lucas	5,654	48.0	−0.5
Majority		483	4.0	+1.1
Turnout		11,791	82.0	+5.6
Registered electors		14,383		
Liberal hold		Swing	+0.6	

=== Elections in the 1900s ===
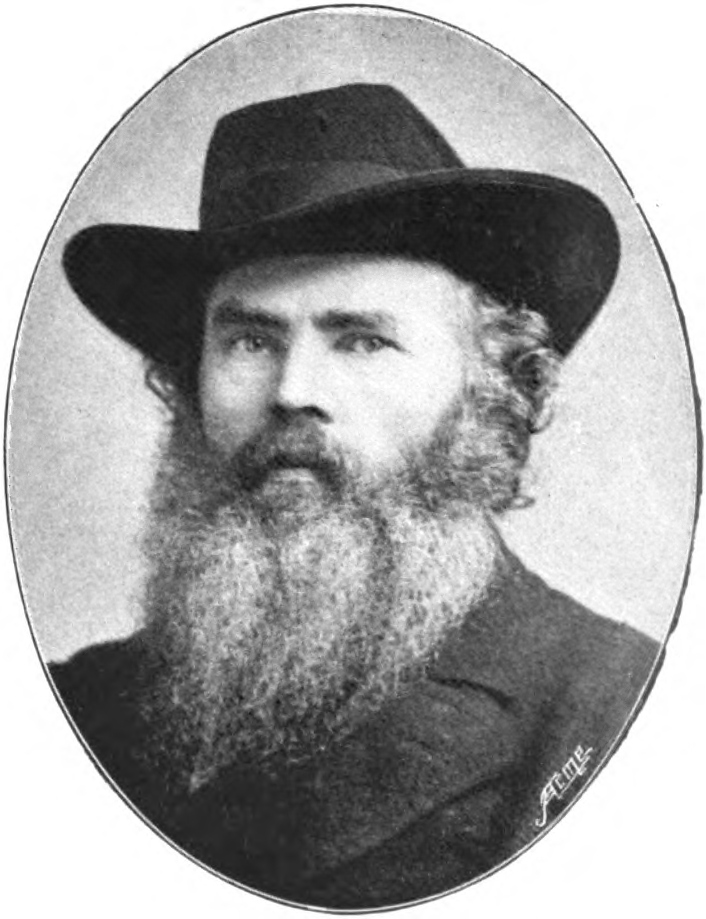
Allan

General election 1900: Gateshead
Party	Candidate	Votes	%	±%
Liberal	William Allan	6,657	53.8	+1.8
Liberal Unionist	John Sherburn	5,711	46.2	−1.8
Majority		946	7.6	+3.6
Turnout		12,368	74.3	−7.7
Registered electors		16,635		
Liberal hold		Swing	+1.8	

Morpeth

1904 Gateshead by-election
Party	Candidate	Votes	%	±%
Lib-Lab	John Johnson	8,220	54.0	+0.2
Liberal Unionist	Charles Howard	7,015	46.0	−0.2
Majority		1,205	8.0	+0.4
Turnout		15,235	84.9	+10.6
Registered electors		17,951		
Lib-Lab hold		Swing	+0.2	

General election 1906: Gateshead
Party	Candidate	Votes	%	±%
Lib-Lab	John Johnson	9,651	65.3	+11.5
Liberal Unionist	Theodore Angier	5,126	34.7	−11.5
Majority		4,525	30.6	+23.0
Turnout		14,777	79.4	+5.1
Registered electors		18,614		
Lib-Lab hold		Swing	+11.5	

=== Elections in the 1910s ===
John Johnson

General election January 1910: Gateshead
Party	Candidate	Votes	%	±%
Liberal	Harold Elverston	6,800	40.7	+40.7
Liberal Unionist	Nicholas Grattan-Doyle	6,323	37.9	+3.2
Labour	John Johnson	3,572	21.4	−43.9
Majority		477	2.8	−27.8
Turnout		16,695	87.2	+7.8
Liberal hold		Swing	+42.3	

General election December 1910: Gateshead
Party	Candidate	Votes	%	±%
Liberal	Harold Elverston	8,763	61.0	+20.3
Conservative	Herbert Surtees	5,608	39.0	+1.1
Majority		3,155	22.0	+19.2
Turnout		14,371	75.1	−12.1
Liberal hold		Swing		

General election 1918: Gateshead
Party		Candidate	Votes	%	±%
C	Unionist	Herbert Surtees	17,215	56.9	+17.9
	Labour	John Brotherton	7,212	23.8	New
	Liberal	Harold Elverston	5,833	19.3	−41.7
Majority			10,003	33.1	N/A
Turnout			30,260	54.6	−20.5
	Unionist gain from Liberal		Swing		
C indicates candidate endorsed by the coalition government.

=== Elections in the 1920s ===
General election 1922: Gateshead
Party	Candidate	Votes	%	±%
Labour	John Brotherton	18,795	43.8	+20.0
Unionist	Herbert Surtees	13,424	31.3	−25.6
Liberal	John Dickie	10,679	24.9	+5.6
Majority		5,371	12.5	N/A
Turnout		42,898	78.4	+23.8
Labour gain from Unionist		Swing	+22.8	

General election 1923: Gateshead
Party	Candidate	Votes	%	±%
Liberal	John Dickie	17,344	42.7	+17.8
Labour	John Brotherton	16,689	41.1	−2.7
Unionist	George Francis Stephen Christie	6,592	16.2	−15.1
Majority		355	1.6	N/A
Turnout		40,625	73.2	−5.2
Liberal gain from Labour		Swing	+10.3	

General election 1924: Gateshead
Party	Candidate	Votes	%	±%
Labour	John Beckett	23,514	50.2	+9.1
Unionist	Hilton Philipson	14,178	30.2	+14.0
Liberal	John Dickie	9,185	19.6	−23.1
Majority		9,336	20.0	N/A
Turnout		46,877	82.7	+9.5
Labour gain from Liberal		Swing	−2.5	

General election 1929: Gateshead
Party	Candidate	Votes	%	±%
Labour	James Melville	28,393	52.6	+2.4
Unionist	Ian Orr-Ewing	11,644	21.5	−8.7
Liberal	John Fennell	10,314	19.1	−0.5
Independent Liberal	John Leonard Watson	3,688	6.8	New
Majority		16,749	31.1	+11.1
Turnout		54,039	73.9	−8.8
Labour hold		Swing	+5.5	

=== Elections in the 1930s ===
Conservative candidate Charles White withdrew on 15 October 1931. Barr and Fennell also withdrew, but their names remained on the ballot paper.

1931 Gateshead by-election
Party	Candidate	Votes	%	±%
Labour	Herbert Evans	22,893	51.6	−1.0
Conservative	Cuthbert Headlam	21,501	48.4	+26.9
Majority		1,392	3.2	−27.9
Turnout		44,394	60.8	−13.1
Labour hold		Swing		

Sir James Melville died on 1 May 1931, leading to a by-election on 8 June. The winner of the by-election, Herbert Evans, himself died on 7 October, the day parliament was dissolved for the 1931 general election.

General election 1931: Gateshead
Party	Candidate	Votes	%	±%
National Liberal	Thomas Magnay	34,764	60.09	
Labour	Ernest Bevin	21,826	37.73	
New Party	John Stuart Barr	1,077	1.86	New
National Labour	John Fennell	187	0.32	New
Majority		12,938	22.36	N/A
Turnout		57,314	78.32	
National Liberal gain from Labour		Swing		

General election 1935: Gateshead
Party	Candidate	Votes	%	±%
National Liberal	Thomas Magnay	28,772	52.72	
Labour	James Wilson	25,804	47.28	
Majority		2,968	5.44	
Turnout		54,576	74.68	
National Liberal hold		Swing		

=== Elections in the 1940s ===
General election 1945: Gateshead
Party	Candidate	Votes	%	±%
Labour	Konni Zilliacus	36,736	67.5	+20.2
National Liberal	Thomas Magnay	17,719	32.5	−20.2
Majority		19,017	35.0	N/A
Turnout		54,455	76.0	+1.3
Labour gain from National Liberal		Swing		

== See also ==
- 1931 Gateshead by-election
- parliamentary constituencies in Tyne and Wear
- History of parliamentary constituencies and boundaries in Tyne and Wear
- History of parliamentary constituencies and boundaries in Durham

== Sources ==
- Craig, F. W. S. (1983) [1969]. British parliamentary election results 1918-1949 (3rd ed.). Chichester: Parliamentary Research Services. ISBN 978-0-900178-06-1.
