= Chowdene =

Suburb and electoral ward in England

Coordinates: 54.928333°N 1.601667°W

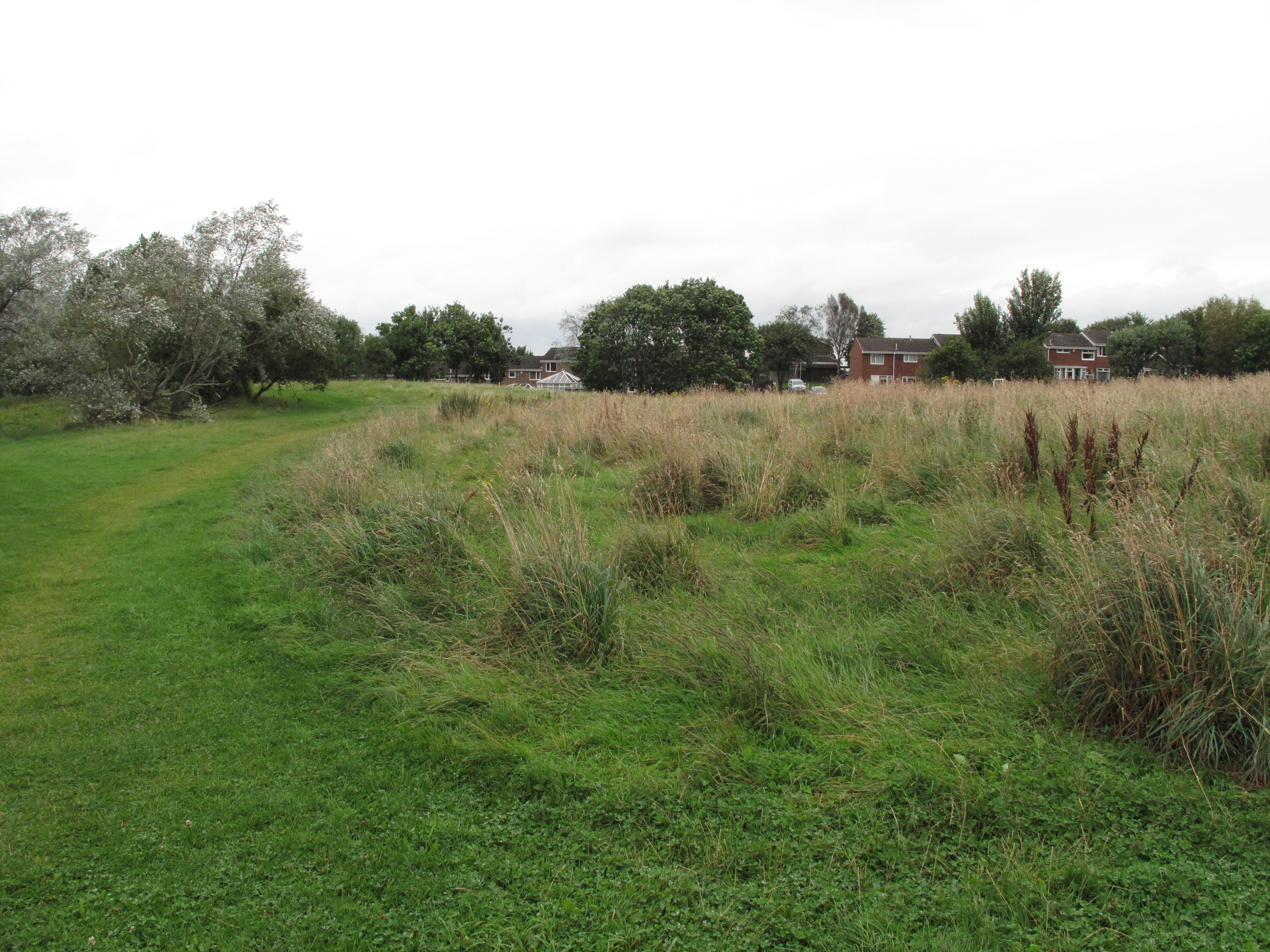
- Chowdene Estate in 2012

- Location within Tyne and Wear
- OS grid reference: NZ2559
- Metropolitan borough: Gateshead
- Metropolitan county: Tyne and Wear
- Region: North East
- Country: England
- Sovereign state: United Kingdom
- Post town: NEWCASTLE UPON TYNE
- Postcode district: NE9
- Dialling code: 0191
- Police: Northumbria
- Fire: Tyne and Wear
- Ambulance: North East
- UK Parliament: Gateshead Central and Whickham

Chowdene is a suburb and electoral ward of Gateshead, Tyne and Wear.

== History ==
In 2003, plans for a mobile phone mast in the area were refused.

== Politics ==
Chowdene elects three councillors to Metropolitan Gateshead Council.

Chowdene is part of the Gateshead Central and Whickham parliamentary constituency.
