= John Brotherton (politician) =

English politician (1867–1941)

John Brotherton (7 March 1867 – 8 March 1941) was Labour MP for Gateshead.

Born in Leeds, Brotherton completed an apprenticeship as an engineer, and joined the Amalgamated Society of Engineers, serving as a branch secretary for 21 years.

Brotherton stood unsuccessfully as the Labour Party candidate for Gateshead at the 1918 United Kingdom general election. He won the seat from the Unionists in 1922, but lost it to the Liberals in 1923. In 1927, he was elected to Leeds City Council, serving until 1930, and again from 1932 onwards. He also served as the secretary of Leeds Trades Council, and represented it on the Trades Councils' Joint Consultative Committee.

Parliament of the United Kingdom
Preceded by Herbert Conyers Surtees	Member of Parliament for Gateshead; 1922 – 1923	Succeeded by John Purcell Dickie
