= Joubert v Enslin =

South African legal case

Joubert v Enslin is an important case in South African contract law, heard in the Cape Town Appellate Division on July 8, 9, and 22, 1910.

== Golden rule of interpretation ==
The case is famous primarily for its articulation of the fundamental precept of contractual interpretation in South Africa:

The golden rule applicable to the interpretation of all contracts is to ascertain and to follow the intention of the parties; and, if the contract itself, or any evidence admissible under the circumstances, affords a definite indication of the meaning of the contracting parties, then it seems to me that a Court should always give effect to that meaning.

Effect must be given, in other words, to the parties' common intention: "that is to say, to what both of them intended upon entering into the contract, and not to what the one or the other had in the back of his or her mind." This dictum suggests that the courts take a "factual or historical-psychological approach to interpretation, i.e. one which seeks to establish the intention of the parties as a fact existing at the time of contracting." This more or less accords with the subjective and consensual basis of the rest of the South African law of contract, but it gives rise to a paradox, since the subjective intentions of the parties must be established with reference to certain objective factors, most obviously the words printed on the contract.
