= Parliamentary constituencies in Tyne and Wear =

The ceremonial county of Tyne and Wear is divided into 13 parliamentary constituencies, including 2 cross-county boundary seats with Northumberland and one with Durham, of which 9 are borough constituencies and 4 county constituencies.

== Constituencies ==
Conservative Labour Reform UK

Constituency (Note: BC denotes borough constituency, CC denotes county constituency.)	Electorate	Majority (Note: The majority is the number of votes the winning candidate receives more than their nearest rival.)	Member of Parliament	Nearest opposition	Map
Blaydon and Consett CC (part)	70,487	11,153	Liz Twist	David Ayre	
Cramlington and Killingworth CC (part)	76,228	12,820	Emma Foody	Gordon Fletcher	
Gateshead Central and Whickham BC	69,827	9,644	Mark Ferguson	Damian Heslop	
Hexham CC (part)	76,431	3,713	Joe Morris	Guy Opperman	
Houghton and Sunderland South CC	78,448	7,168	Bridget Phillipson	Sam Woods-Brass	
Jarrow and Gateshead East BC	70,272	8,946	Kate Osborne	Lynda Alexandra	
Newcastle upon Tyne Central and West BC	76,969	11,060	Chi Onwurah	Ashton Muncaster	
Newcastle upon Tyne East and Wallsend BC	76,425	12,817	Mary Glindon	Janice Richardson	
Newcastle upon Tyne North BC	75,146	17,762	Catherine McKinnell	Guy Renner-Thompson	
South Shields BC	68,366	6,653	Emma Lewell-Buck	Steve Holt	
Sunderland Central BC	76,145	6,073	Lewis Atkinson	Chris Eynon	
Tynemouth BC	76,145	15,455	Alan Campbell	Lewis Bartoli	
Washington and Gateshead South BC	70,972	6,913	Sharon Hodgson	Paul Donaghy	

== Boundary changes ==
=== 2024 ===
See 2023 review of Westminster constituencies for further details.

Name (2010-2024)
1. Blaydon
2. Gateshead
3. Houghton and Sunderland South
4. Jarrow
5. Newcastle upon Tyne Central
6. Newcastle upon Tyne East
7. Newcastle upon Tyne North
8. North Tyneside
9. South Shields
10. Sunderland Central
11. Tynemouth
12. Washington and Sunderland West
Boundaries 2010-2024

Parliamentary constituencies in Tyne and Wear (2010-2024)

Name (2024-present)
1. Blaydon and Consett
2. Cramlington and Killingworth
3. Gateshead Central and Whickham
4. Hexham
5. Houghton and Sunderland South
6. Jarrow and Gateshead East
7. Newcastle upon Tyne Central and West
8. Newcastle upon Tyne East and Wallsend
9. Newcastle upon Tyne North
10. South Shields
11. Sunderland Central
12. Tynemouth
13. Washington and Gateshead South
Boundaries 2024-present

Parliamentary constituencies in Tyne and Wear (2024-present)

For the 2023 review of Westminster constituencies, which redrew the constituency map ahead of the 2024 general election, the Boundary Commission for England opted to combine Newcastle upon Tyne and North Tyneside with Northumberland as a sub-region of the North East Region, with the creation of two cross-county boundary constituencies comprising an expanded Hexham seat and a new seat named Cramlington and Killingworth. Gateshead, South Tyneside and Sunderland would be combined with County Durham, resulting in another cross-county boundary constituency, named Blaydon and Consett. The constituencies names of Blaydon, Gateshead, Jarrow, North Tyneside, Newcastle upon Tyne Central, Newcastle upon Tyne East, and Washington and Sunderland West were abolished, and new or re-established constituency names of Gateshead Central and Whickham, Jarrow and Gateshead East, Newcastle upon Tyne Central and West, Newcastle upon Tyne East and Wallsend, and Washington and Gateshead South created.

The following seats resulted from the boundary review:

Containing electoral wards from Gateshead

- Blaydon and Consett (part)
- Gateshead Central and Whickham
- Jarrow and Gateshead East (part)
- Washington and Gateshead South (part)

Containing electoral wards from Newcastle upon Tyne

- Cramlington and Killingworth (parts also in North Tyneside and Northumberland)
- Hexham (part also in Northumberland)
- Newcastle upon Tyne Central and West
- Newcastle upon Tyne East and Wallsend (part)
- Newcastle upon Tyne North (part)

Containing electoral wards from North Tyneside

- Cramlington and Killingworth (parts also in Newcastle upon Tyne and Northumberland)
- Newcastle upon Tyne East and Wallsend (part)
- Newcastle upon Tyne North (part)
- Tynemouth

Containing electoral wards from South Tyneside

- Jarrow and Gateshead East (part)
- South Shields

Containing electoral wards from Sunderland

- Houghton and Sunderland South
- Sunderland Central
- Washington and Gateshead South (part)

=== 2010 ===
Under the fifth periodic review of Westminster constituencies, the Boundary Commission for England decided to reduce the number of seats in Tyne and Wear from 13 to 12, leading to significant changes. The constituencies of Gateshead East and Washington West, Houghton and Washington East, Sunderland North, Sunderland South, and Tyne Bridge were abolished and replaced with Gateshead, Houghton and Sunderland South, Sunderland Central, and Washington and Sunderland West. Newcastle upon Tyne East and Wallsend became Newcastle upon Tyne East.

Name (1997-2010)
1. Blaydon
2. Gateshead East and Washington West
3. Houghton and Washington East
4. Jarrow
5. Newcastle upon Tyne Central
6. Newcastle upon Tyne East and Wallsend
7. Newcastle upon Tyne North
8. North Tyneside
9. South Shields
10. Sunderland North
11. Sunderland South
12. Tyne Bridge
13. Tynemouth
Boundaries 1997-2010

Parliamentary constituencies in Tyne and Wear (1997-2010)

Name (2010-2024)
1. Blaydon
2. Gateshead
3. Houghton and Sunderland South
4. Jarrow
5. Newcastle upon Tyne Central
6. Newcastle upon Tyne East
7. Newcastle upon Tyne North
8. North Tyneside
9. South Shields
10. Sunderland Central
11. Tynemouth
12. Washington and Sunderland West
Boundaries 2010–2024

Parliamentary constituencies in Tyne and Wear (2010-2024)

== Results history ==
Primary data source: House of Commons research briefing - General election results from 1918 to 2019

=== 2024 ===
The number of votes cast for each political party who fielded candidates in constituencies comprising Tyne and Wear in the 2024 general election were as follows: (Note: Vote shares include the cross-county constituencies of Blaydon and Consett and Cramlington and Killingworth which have roughly evenly split electorates between Tyne and Wear and County Durham and Northumberland respectively. Vote shares exclude Hexham which has a majority Northumberland electorate)

Party	Votes	%	Change from 2019	Seats	Change from 2019
Labour	238,034	47.7%	▼0.1%	12	0
Reform	109,162	21.9%	▲12.8	0	0
Conservative	66,117	13.2%	▼17.7%	0	0
Greens	39,282	7.9%	▲4.8%	0	0
Liberal Democrats	33,350	6.7%	▼0.3%	0	0
Others	13,155	2.6%	▲0.6%	0	0
Total	499,100	100.0		12	

=== Percentage votes ===
Election year	1983	1987	1992	1997	2001	2005	2010	2015	2017	2019	2024
Labour	45.4	53.6	57.1	67.1	62.9	55.8	48.7	52.1	60.8	47.8	47.7
Reform	-	-	-	-	-	-	-	-	-	9.1	21.9
Conservative	31.3	27.6	28.8	17.3	17.7	17.4	21.4	20.3	28.5	30.9	13.2
Green Party	-	*	*	*	*	*	0.6	4.1	1.6	3.1	7.9
Liberal Democrat^{1}	23.3	18.6	13.7	11.8	16.6	23.2	21.7	5.5	4.0	7.0	6.7
UKIP	-	-	-	*	*	*	1.8	17.3	4.7	*	*
Other	0.1	0.3	0.4	3.8	2.8	3.6	5.8	0.7	0.3	2.0	2.6

^{1}1983 & 1987 - Alliance

* Included in Other

=== Seats ===
Election year	1983	1987	1992	1997	2001	2005	2010	2015	2017	2019	2024
Labour	11	12	12	13	13	13	12	12	12	12	12
Conservative	2	1	1	0	0	0	0	0	0	0	0
Total	13	13	13	13	13	13	12	12	12	12	12

=== Maps ===
==== 1983 to 2024 ====
1983

1987

1992

1997

2001

2005

2010

2015

2017

2019

==== 2024 to present (including three cross-county constituencies) ====
2024

== Historical representation by party ==
=== 1983 to 2010 ===
Conservative Labour

Constituency	1983	85	1987	1992	1997	2001	2005
Blaydon	McWilliam						Anderson
Gateshead East / Gateshead East & Washington West (1997)	Conlan		Quin				Hodgson
Houghton and Washington / Houghton & Washington East (1997)	Boyes				Kemp		
Jarrow	Dixon				Hepburn		
Newcastle upon Tyne Central	Merchant		Cousins				
Newcastle upon Tyne East / Newcastle-u-T East & Wallsend (1997)	N. Brown						
Newcastle upon Tyne North	R. Brown		Henderson				
Wallsend / North Tyneside (1997)	Garrett			Byers			
South Shields	Clark					Miliband	
Sunderland North	Clay			Etherington			
Tyne Bridge	Cowans	Clelland					
Tynemouth	Trotter				Campbell		
Sunderland South	Bagier		Mullin				

=== 2010 to present ===
Independent Labour

Constituency	2010	13	2015	2017	19	2019	23	2024
Blaydon / Blaydon & Consett (2024)^{1}	Anderson			Twist				
Gateshead / Gateshead Central & Whickham ('24)	Mearns							Ferguson
Houghton & Sunderland South	Phillipson							
Jarrow / Jarrow & Gateshead East (2024)	Hepburn				→	Osborne		
Newcastle upon Tyne Central / N-u-T Central & West (2024)	Onwurah							
Newcastle upon Tyne East / N-u-T East & Wallsend (2024)	N. Brown						→	Glindon
Newcastle upon Tyne North	McKinnell							
South Shields	Miliband	Lewell-Buck						
Sunderland Central	Elliott							Atkinson
Tynemouth	Campbell							
Washington & Sunderland W / Washington & Gateshead S ('24)	Hodgson							
North Tyneside^{2}	Glindon							N/A

^{1}includes areas of County Durham

^{2}parts transferred in 2024 to the seat of Cramlington & Killingworth which is mostly in Northumberland

== See also ==
- List of parliamentary constituencies in the North East (region)
- History of parliamentary constituencies and boundaries in Tyne and Wear
