= History of parliamentary constituencies and boundaries in Tyne and Wear =

The ceremonial county of Tyne and Wear was created under the Local Government Act 1972, which came into effect on 1 April 1974, comprising the urban areas around the mouths of the Rivers Tyne and Wear, previously parts of the historic counties of Northumberland and Durham. It returned 12 MPs to the UK Parliament from 2010 to 2024. Under the 2023 review of Westminster constituencies, coming into effect for the 2024 general election, the boundary commission proposed two cross-county boundary seats with Northumberland and one with Durham, in addition to 10 constituencies wholly within the county boundaries, .

== Numbers of seats ==
The table below shows the number of MPs representing Tyne and Wear at each major redistribution of seats affecting the county.

| Year | County seats^{1} | Borough seats^{1} | Total |
|---|---|---|---|
| 1974–1983^{2} | 1 | 13 | 14 |
| 1983–1997 | - | 13 | 13 |
| 1997–2010 | - | 13 | 13 |
| 2010–2024 | - | 12 | 12 |
| 2024–present^{3} | 2 | 9 | 11 |

^{1}Since 1950, seats have been classified as County or Borough Constituencies.

^{2}Approximate equivalent number of constituencies. Prior to the redistribution coming into effect for the 1983 general election, several constituencies were split between Tyne and Wear and the counties of Northumberland or Durham.

^{3}Approximate equivalent number of constituencies. 10 constituencies wholly within Tyne and Wear; two shared with Northumberland; and one shared with Durham.

== Constituencies timeline ==
County seat Borough seat

| Constituencies | 1974-1983 | 1983-1997 | 1997-2010 | 2010-2024 | 2024-present |
|---|---|---|---|---|---|
| Tynemouth | ←present | | | | |
| Blyth (part) | ←1983 | | | | |
| Cramlington and Killingworth (part) | | | | | 2024-present |
| North Tyneside | | | 1997-2024 | | |
| Wallsend | ←1997 | | | | |
| Newcastle upon Tyne North | ←present | | | | |
| Newcastle upon Tyne East | ←1997 | | | 2010-2024 | |
| Newcastle upon Tyne East and Wallsend | | | 1997-2010 | | 2024-present |
| Newcastle upon Tyne Central | ←2024 | | | | |
| Newcastle upon Tyne Central and West | | | | | 2024-present |
| Newcastle upon Tyne West | ←1983 | | | | |
| Hexham (part) | ←1983 | Wholly within Northumberland | | | 2024-present |
| Blaydon | ←2024 | | | | |
| Blaydon and Consett (part) | | | | | 2024-present |
| Gateshead West | ←1983 | | | | |
| Gateshead Central and Whickham | | | | | 2024-present |
| Tyne Bridge | | 1983-2010 | | | |
| Gateshead | | | | 2010-2024 | |
| Gateshead East | ←1997 | | | | |
| Gateshead East and Washington West | | | 1997-2010 | | |
| Jarrow and Gateshead East | | | | | 2024-present |
| Jarrow | ←2024 | | | | |
| South Shields | ←present | | | | |
| Sunderland North | ←2010 | | | | |
| Sunderland Central | | | | 2010-present | |
| Sunderland South | ←2010 | | | | |
| Houghton and Sunderland South | | | | 2010-2024 | 2024-present |
| Houghton-le-Spring (part) | ←1983 | | | | |
| Houghton and Washington | | 1983-1997 | | | |
| Houghton and Washington East | | | 1997-2010 | | |
| Chester-le-Street (part) | ←1983 | | | | |
| Washington and Sunderland West | | | | 2010-2024 | |
| Washington and Gateshead South | | | | | 2024-present |

== Boundary reviews ==
=== 1974 ===
At the time of its creation, Tyne and Wear contained the equivalent of approximately 14 constituencies. North of the River Tyne, previously part of Northumberland, they comprised the four Newcastle upon Tyne constituencies and those of Wallsend and Tynemouth^{1}, together with small areas of Hexham and Blyth. South of the River Tyne and around the River Wear, previously part of Durham, they comprised the two Gateshead and two Sunderland constituencies and those of Blaydon, Jarrow and South Shields, together with most of Houghton-le-Spring and parts of Chester-le-Street.

^{1} Apart from the small community of Seaton Sluice.

=== 1983 ===
The next change to parliamentary constituency boundaries, following the recommendations of the Third Periodic Review of Westminster constituencies, reflected the change in county boundaries and reorganisation of local government authorities in 1974. The review did not come into effect for a further nine years, at the 1983 general election, and resulted in a reduction of one seat. This was achieved by effectively abolishing the existing seats of Newcastle upon Tyne Central and Gateshead West and creating a new constituency named Tyne Bridge which spanned the River Tyne.

The boundaries of Newcastle upon Tyne Central were completely redrawn with only a small part of the existing constituency retained. The majority of the old seat was incorporated into Tyne Bridge, with eastern parts transferred to Newcastle upon Tyne East. The reconstituted seat comprised the bulk of the existing Newcastle upon Tyne North seat, combined with parts of the abolished constituency of Newcastle upon Tyne West and small area transferred from Wallsend.

Newcastle upon Tyne North was also reconstituted, with no part of the existing constituency retained. The new boundaries comprised about half of the abolished Newcastle upon Tyne West seat, including Newburn, together with areas which had been absorbed into the metropolitan borough, transferred from Wallsend (South Gosforth) and Hexham (part of Castle Ward). Wallsend now included a small area transferred from Blyth (Earsdon and Backworth).

The abolished seat of Gateshead West was absorbed into Gateshead East and Tyne Bridge. Blaydon gained the former parishes of Birtley and Lamesley from the abolished constituency of Chester-le-Street. Houghton-le-Spring gained the new town of Washington, which had also been part of Chester-le-Street, and lost the town of Seaham and surrounding communities, which had been retained in County Durham (transferred to Easington). It was consequently renamed Houghton and Washington.

Parts of Jarrow were transferred to South Shields to equalise their electorates. Sunderland North, Sunderland South and Tynemouth were largely unchanged.

=== 1997 ===
Under the Fourth Periodic Review, the following transfers between constituencies were made:

| Wards transferred | From | To |
|---|---|---|
| Sandyford | Newcastle upon Tyne East | Newcastle upon Tyne Central |
| Wallsend; Northumberland | Wallsend (renamed North Tyneside) | Newcastle upon Tyne East (renamed Newcastle upon Tyne East and Wallsend) |
| Riverside | Tynemouth | North Tyneside |
| Deckham; Saltwell | Gateshead East | Tyne Bridge |
| Wrekendyke | Gateshead East | Jarrow |
| Biddick Hall | Jarrow | South Shields |
| South Hylton | Sunderland North | Sunderland South |
| Washington South; Washington West | Houghton and Washington (renamed Houghton and Washington East) | Gateshead East (renamed Gateshead East and Washington West) |
| Ryhope | Sunderland South | Houghton and Washington East |

=== 2010 ===
The Fifth Review resulted in a further reduction in the county's representation, from 13 to 12 MPs, with the abolition of the cross-river constituency of Tyne Bridge.

The part of Tyne Bridge to the north of the River Tyne was transferred to Newcastle upon Tyne Central, with eastern parts of this seat being moved back to the re-established seat of Newcastle upon Tyne East (replacing Newcastle upon Tyne East and Wallsend). The North Tyneside borough wards of Wallsend and Northumberland were transferred back out to the North Tyneside constituency, with Valley ward moving to Tynemouth.

The majority of the Tyne Bridge constituency, south of the Tyne, was incorporated into a re-established Gateshead constituency. This also included the Gateshead borough wards in the abolished constituency of Gateshead East and Washington West, with the exception of the Pelaw and Heworth ward which was transferred to Jarrow. The South Tyneside borough ward of Whitburn and Marsden was transferred from Jarrow to South Shields.

The boundaries of the three constituencies in the city of Sunderland were radically redrawn with Sunderland North, Sunderland South, and Houghton and Washington East being replaced by Sunderland Central, Houghton and Sunderland South, and Washington and Sunderland West. The last of these included the two Washington wards which had been in Gateshead East and Washington West, thus reuniting the town of Washington.

Blaydon and Newcastle upon Tyne North were affected by ward boundary changes.

=== 2024 ===
For the 2023 Periodic Review of Westminster constituencies, which redrew the constituency map ahead of the 2024 United Kingdom general election, the Boundary Commission for England opted to combine Newcastle upon Tyne and North Tyneside with Northumberland as a sub-region of the North East Region, with the creation of two cross-county boundary constituencies comprising an expanded Hexham seat and a new seat named Cramlington and Killingworth. Gateshead, South Tyneside and Sunderland were combined with County Durham, resulting in another cross-county boundary constituency, named Blaydon and Consett.

To the north of the River Tyne, the constituency of North Tyneside was abolished; Newcastle upon Tyne East was once again largely absorbed into the re-established seat of Newcastle upon Tyne East and Wallsend; Newcastle upon Tyne Central was expanded westwards and renamed Newcastle upon Tyne Central and West; and Newcastle upon Tyne North was completely reconfigured with less than half its previous electorate being included within its new boundaries.

To the south of the River Tyne, Blaydon was abolished, with the knock-on impact resulting in Gateshead Central and Whickham replacing Gateshead, Jarrow and Gateshead East replacing Jarrow, and Washington and Gateshead South replacing Washington and Sunderland West.

Movements between constituencies are detailed in the table below

| Communities transferred | From | To |
|---|---|---|
| Killingworth, Camperdown, Wideopen | North Tyneside | Cramlington and Killingworth |
| Wallsend | North Tyneside | Newcastle upon Tyne East and Wallsend |
| North Shields | North Tyneside | Tynemouth |
| Benton, Longbenton | North Tyneside | Newcastle upon Tyne North |
| Shiremoor, Backworth | Tynemouth | Cramlington and Killingworth |
| Jesmond | Newcastle upon Tyne East | Newcastle upon Tyne North |
| Lemington, Denton | Newcastle upon Tyne North | Newcastle upon Tyne Central and West |
| Newburn, Throckley | Newcastle upon Tyne North | Hexham |
| Blaydon, Ryton | Blaydon | Blaydon and Consett |
| Whickham | Blaydon | Gateshead Central and Whickham |
| Birtley, Lamesley | Blaydon | Washington and Gateshead South |
| Felling | Gateshead | Jarrow and Gateshead East |
| South Hylton, Pennywell | Washington and Sunderland West | Houghton and Sunderland South |

== Maps ==
1974-1983

1983-1997

1997-2010

2010-2024

2024-present

== Communities Timeline ==
The table below shows which constituencies represented selected communities within the current county from 1885 onwards.

| Metropolitan borough | Community | 1885-1918 | 1918-1950 | 1950-1955 | 1955-1974 | 1974-1983 | 1983-1997 | 1997-2010 | 2010-2024 | 2024-present |
|---|---|---|---|---|---|---|---|---|---|---|
| Gateshead | Bensham | Gateshead | | Gateshead West | | | Tyne Bridge | | Gateshead | Gateshead Central & Whickham |
| Gateshead | Birtley | Chester-le-Street | | | | | Blaydon | | | Washington & Gateshead South |
| Gateshead | Blaydon | Chester-le-Street | Blaydon | | | | | | | Blaydon & Consett |
| Gateshead | Dunston | Chester-le-Street | Blaydon | | | | Tyne Bridge | | Gateshead | Gateshead Central & Whickham |
| Gateshead | Felling | Jarrow | | | Gateshead East | | | Gateshead East &Washington West | Gateshead | Jarrow & Gateshead East |
| Gateshead | Heworth | Jarrow | | | Gateshead East | | | Gateshead East &Washington West | Jarrow | Jarrow & Gateshead East |
| Gateshead | Low Fell | Gateshead | | Gateshead East | | | | Gateshead East &Washington West | Gateshead | Gateshead Central & Whickham |
| Gateshead | Ryton | Chester-le-Street | Blaydon | | | | | | | Blaydon & Consett |
| Gateshead | Saltwell | Gateshead | | Gateshead West | | | Gateshead East | Tyne Bridge | Gateshead | Gateshead Central & Whickham |
| Gateshead | Town centre | Gateshead | | Gateshead West | | | Tyne Bridge | | Gateshead | Gateshead Central & Whickham |
| Gateshead | Whickham | Chester-le-Street | Blaydon | | | | | | | Gateshead Central & Whickham |
| Gateshead | Wrekenton | Chester-le-Street | | Gateshead East | | | | Gateshead East & Washington West | Gateshead | Gateshead Central & Whickham |
| Metropolitan borough | Community | 1885-1918 | 1918-1950 | 1950-1955 | 1955-1974 | 1974-1983 | 1983-1997 | 1997-2010 | 2010-present | 2024-present |
| Newcastle upon Tyne | Benwell | Tyneside | Newcastle upon Tyne West | | Newcastle upon Tyne Central | | Tyne Bridge | | Newcastle upon Tyne Central | Newcastle upon Tyne Central & West |
| Newcastle upon Tyne | Byker | Newcastle upon Tyne | Newcastle upon Tyne East | Newcastle upon Tyne Central | | | Newcastle upon Tyne East | Newcastle upon Tyne East & Wallsend | Newcastle upon Tyne East | Newcastle upon Tyne East & Wallsend |
| Newcastle upon Tyne | City centre | Newcastle upon Tyne | Newcastle upon Tyne Central | | | | Tyne Bridge | | Newcastle upon Tyne Central | Newcastle upon Tyne Central & West |
| Newcastle upon Tyne | Elswick | Newcastle upon Tyne | Newcastle upon Tyne West | Newcastle upon Tyne North | | | Tyne Bridge | | Newcastle upon Tyne Central | Newcastle upon Tyne Central & West |
| Newcastle upon Tyne | Fenham | Tyneside | Newcastle upon Tyne West | | | | Newcastle upon Tyne Central | | | Newcastle upon Tyne Central & West |
| Newcastle upon Tyne | Gosforth | Tyneside | Wallsend | | | | Newcastle upon Tyne Central / North | | | Newcastle upon Tyne North |
| Newcastle upon Tyne | Heaton | Newcastle upon Tyne | Newcastle upon Tyne North | Newcastle upon Tyne East | | | | Newcastle upon Tyne East & Wallsend | Newcastle upon Tyne East | Newcastle upon Tyne East & Wallsend |
| Newcastle upon Tyne | Jesmond | Newcastle upon Tyne | Newcastle upon Tyne North | | | | Newcastle upon Tyne Central | | Newcastle upon Tyne East | Newcastle upon Tyne North |
| Newcastle upon Tyne | Kenton | Tyneside | Wansbeck | Newcastle upon Tyne West | | | Newcastle upon Tyne Central | | | Newcastle upon Tyne North |
| Newcastle upon Tyne | Newburn | Tyneside | Wansbeck | Newcastle upon Tyne West | | | Newcastle upon Tyne North | | | Hexham |
| Newcastle upon Tyne | Walker | Tyneside | Newcastle upon Tyne East | | | | | Newcastle upon Tyne East & Wallsend | Newcastle upon Tyne East | Newcastle upon Tyne East & Wallsend |
| Newcastle upon Tyne | Westgate | Newcastle upon Tyne | Newcastle upon Tyne Central | Newcastle upon Tyne North | | | Newcastle upon Tyne Central | | | Newcastle upon Tyne Central & West |
| Newcastle upon Tyne | Woolsington | Tyneside | Wansbeck | Hexham | | | Newcastle upon Tyne North | | | Hexham |
| Metropolitan borough | Community | 1885-1918 | 1918-1950 | 1950-1955 | 1955-1974 | 1974-1983 | 1983-1997 | 1997-2010 | 2010-present | 2024-present |
| North Tyneside | Backworth | Wansbeck | | Blyth | | | Wallsend | North Tyneside | Tynemouth | Cramlington & Killingworth |
| North Tyneside | Dudley | Tyneside | Wallsend | | | | | North Tyneside | | Cramlington & Killingworth |
| North Tyneside | Longbenton | Tyneside | Wallsend | | | | | North Tyneside | | Newcastle upon Tyne North |
| North Tyneside | Monkseaton | Wansbeck | | Tynemouth | | | | | | |
| North Tyneside | North Shields | Tynemouth | | | | | | | North Tyneside | Tynemouth |
| North Tyneside | Tynemouth | Tynemouth | | | | | | | | |
| North Tyneside | Wallsend | Tyneside | Wallsend | | | | | Newcastle upon Tyne East & Wallsend | North Tyneside | Newcastle upon Tyne East & Wallsend |
| North Tyneside | Whitley Bay | Wansbeck | | Tynemouth | | | | | | |
| North Tyneside | Willington Quay | Tyneside | Wallsend | | | | Tynemouth | North Tyneside | | Newcastle upon Tyne East & Wallsend |
| Metropolitan borough | Community | 1885-1918 | 1918-1950 | 1950-1955 | 1955-1974 | 1974-1983 | 1983-1997 | 1997-2010 | 2010-present | 2024-present |
| South Tyneside | Cleadon | Jarrow | Houghton-le-Spring | Jarrow | | | | | | South Shields |
| South Tyneside | Harton | Jarrow | Houghton-le-Spring | South Shields | | | | | | |
| South Tyneside | Hebburn | Jarrow | | | | | | | | Jarrow & Gateshead East |
| South Tyneside | Jarrow | Jarrow | | | | | | | | Jarrow & Gateshead East |
| South Tyneside | Monkton | Jarrow | Houghton-le-Spring | Jarrow | | | | | | Jarrow & Gateshead East |
| South Tyneside | South Shields | South Shields | | | | | | | | |
| South Tyneside | The Boldons | Jarrow | Houghton-le-Spring | Jarrow | | | | | | South Shields/ Jarrow & Gateshead East |
| South Tyneside | Whitburn | Jarrow | Houghton-le-Spring | Jarrow | | | | | South Shields | |
| Metropolitan borough | Community | 1885-1918 | 1918-1950 | 1950-1955 | 1955-1974 | 1974-1983 | 1983-1997 | 1997-2010 | 2010-present | 2024-present |
| Sunderland | City centre | Sunderland | | Sunderland North | | | | | Sunderland Central | |
| Sunderland | Fulwell | Houghton-le-Spring | | Sunderland North | | | | | Sunderland Central | |
| Sunderland | Hendon | Sunderland | | Sunderland South | | | | | Sunderland Central | |
| Sunderland | Hetton-le-Hole | Houghton-le-Spring | City of Durham | | | Houghton-le-Spring | Houghton & Washington | Houghton & Washington East | Houghton & Sunderland South | |
| Sunderland | Houghton-le-Spring | Houghton-le-Spring | | | | | Houghton & Washington | Houghton & Washington East | Houghton & Sunderland South | |
| Sunderland | North Hylton | Houghton-le-Spring | | | | Sunderland North | | | Washington & Sunderland West | Washington & Gateshead South |
| Sunderland | Pallion | Sunderland | | Sunderland South | | Sunderland North | | | Sunderland Central | |
| Sunderland | Ryhope | Houghton-le-Spring | | | | Sunderland South | | Houghton & Washington East | Sunderland Central | |
| Sunderland | Silksworth | Houghton-le-Spring | | | | Sunderland South | | | Houghton & Sunderland South | |
| Sunderland | South Hylton | Houghton-le-Spring | | | | Sunderland North | | Sunderland South | Washington & Sunderland West | Houghton and Sunderland South |
| Sunderland | Southwick | Sunderland | | Sunderland North | | | | | Sunderland Central | |
| Sunderland | Washington (East) | Chester-le-Street | | | | | Houghton & Washington | Houghton & Washington East | Washington & Sunderland West | Washington & Gateshead South |
| Sunderland | Washington (West) | Chester-le-Street | | | | | Houghton & Washington | Gateshead East & Washington West | Washington & Sunderland West | Washington & Gateshead South |
| Metropolitan borough | Community | 1885-1918 | 1918-1950 | 1950-1955 | 1955-1974 | 1974-1983 | 1983-1997 | 1997-2010 | 2010-present | 2024-present |

== See also ==
- List of parliamentary constituencies in Tyne and Wear
- History of parliamentary constituencies and boundaries in Northumberland
- History of parliamentary constituencies and boundaries in Durham
