= Finance Committee (House of Commons) =

Select Committee of the British Parliament

The Finance Committee, until 2015 known as the Finance and Services Committee, is a select committee of the House of Commons in the Parliament of the United Kingdom. The committee considers expenditure on and the administration of services for the House of Commons, and it has responsibility for detailed scrutiny of the House’s budget.

== Chairs ==
Committee chairs include those listed below.

Name	Start	End	Party	Constituency
Paul Channon	1 January 1992	21 March 1997	Conservative	Southend West
Lewis Moonie	14 November 1997	22 February 2000	Labour	Kirkcaldy
Stuart Bell	22 February 2000	6 May 2010	Labour	Middlesbrough
John Thurso	27 July 2010	30 March 2015	Liberal Democrats	Caithness, Sutherland and Easter Ross
Nick Brown	21 July 2015	17 October 2016	Labour	Newcastle upon Tyne East
Rosie Winterton	26 October 2016	3 May 2017	Labour	Doncaster Central
Chris Bryant	31 October 2017	6 November 2019	Labour	Rhondda
Lilian Greenwood	3 March 2020	25 May 2021	Labour	Nottingham South
Nick Brown	26 May 2021	28 February 2023	Labour	Newcastle upon Tyne East
Sharon Hodgson	7 March 2023	30 May 2024	Labour	Washington and Sunderland West
Steve Barclay	3 December 2024	present	Conservative	North East Cambridgeshire

== Membership ==
As of November 2024, the members of the committee are as follows:

Member	Party	Constituency
Steve Barclay MP (Chair)	Conservative	North East Cambridgeshire
Luke Akehurst MP	Labour	North Durham
Irene Campbell MP	Labour	North Ayrshire and Arran
Paul Davies MP	Labour	Colne Valley
Nusrat Ghani MP	Conservative	Sussex Weald
Clive Jones MP	Liberal Democrats	Wokingham
Lillian Jones MP	Labour	Kilmarnock and Loudoun
Andrew Murrison MP	Conservative	South West Wiltshire
Euan Stainbank MP	Labour	Falkirk
Sean Woodcock MP	Labour	Banbury
Martin Wrigley MP	Liberal Democrats	Newton Abbot

=== Changes since 2024 ===
Date	Outgoing Member & Party	Constituency	→	New Member & Party	Constituency	Source
20 January 2025	Phil Brickell MP (Labour)	Bolton West	→	Luke Akehurst MP (Labour)	North Durham	Hansard
31 March 2025	Matt Bishop MP (Labour)	Forest of Dean	→	Paul Davies MP (Labour)	Colne Valley	Hansard
1 December 2025	Kate Osborne MP (Labour)	Jarrow and Gateshead East	→	Euan Stainbank MP (Labour)	Falkirk	Hansard
19 January 2026	James MacCleary MP (Liberal Democrats)	Lewes	→	Martin Wrigley MP (Liberal Democrats)	Newton Abbot	Hansard

== 2019–2024 Parliament ==
Member	Party	Constituency
Rt Hon Sharon Hodgson PC MP (Chair)	Labour	Washington and Sunderland West
Clive Betts MP	Labour	Sheffield South East
Sir Geoffrey Clifton-Brown MP	Conservative	The Cotswolds
Nigel Evans MP	Conservative	Ribble Valley
Marion Fellows MP	Scottish National Party	Motherwell and Wishaw
Craig Mackinlay MP	Conservative	South Thanet
Nigel Mills MP	Conservative	Amber Valley
Mary Robinson MP	Conservative	Cheadle
David Simmonds CBE MP	Conservative	Ruislip, Northwood and Pinner
Rt Hon Mark Tami PC MP	Labour	Alyn and Deeside
Rt Hon Dame Rosie Winterton MP	Labour	Doncaster Central

=== Changes since 2019 ===
Date	Outgoing Member & Party	Constituency	→	New Member & Party	Constituency	Source
9 March 2020	Nigel Mills MP (Conservative)	Amber Valley	→	Sir Geoffrey Clifton-Brown MP (Conservative)	The Cotswolds	Hansard
9 March 2020	Sir Robert Syms MP (Conservative)	Poole	→	Dame Eleanor Laing MP (Conservative)	Epping Forest	Hansard
9 March 2020	New seat		→	Tommy Sheppard MP (SNP)	Edinburgh East	Hansard
1 March 2021	Tommy Sheppard MP (SNP)	Edinburgh East	→	Marion Fellows MP (SNP)	Motherwell and Wishaw	Hansard
25 May 2021	Lilian Greenwood MP (Labour)	Nottingham South	→	Nick Brown MP (Labour)	Newcastle upon Tyne East	Hansard
13 December 2022	Dame Eleanor Laing MP (Conservative)	Epping Forest	→	Nigel Evans MP (Conservative)	Ribble Valley	Hansard
24 January 2023	Harriett Baldwin MP (Conservative)	West Worcestershire	→	Craig Mackinlay MP (Conservative)	Ribble Valley	Hansard
24 January 2023	Felicity Buchan MP (Conservative)	Kensington	→	Nigel Mills MP (Conservative)	Amber Valley	Hansard
24 January 2023	Gareth Davies MP (Conservative)	Grantham and Stamford	→	Mary Robinson MP (Conservative)	Cheadle	Hansard
28 February 2023	Nick Brown MP (Chair, Independent)	Newcastle upon Tyne East	→	Sharon Hodgson MP (Labour)	Washington and Sunderland West	Hansard
7 March 2023	Sharon Hodgson MP (Labour)	Washington and Sunderland West	→	Sharon Hodgson MP (Chair, Labour)	Washington and Sunderland West	Parliament

== 2017-2019 Parliament ==
Members were announced on 30 October 2017.

Member	Party	Constituency
Clive Betts MP	Labour	Sheffield South East
Chris Bryant MP	Labour	Rhondda
Geoffrey Clifton-Brown MP	Conservative	The Cotswolds
Neil Gray MP	SNP	Airdrie and Shotts
Lindsay Hoyle MP	Labour	Chorley
Helen Jones MP	Labour	Warrington North
Stephen McPartland MP	Conservative	Stevenage
Mark Menzies MP	Conservative	Fylde
Sir Robert Syms MP	Conservative	Poole
Mark Tami MP	Labour	Alyn and Deeside
William Wragg MP	Conservative	Hazel Grove

=== Changes 2017-2019 ===
Date	Outgoing Member & Party	Constituency	→	New Member & Party	Constituency	Source
5 March 2018	William Wragg MP (Conservative)	Hazel Grove	→	Luke Graham MP (Conservative)	Ochil and South Perthshire	Hansard
18 February 2019	Helen Jones MP (Labour)	Warrington North	→	Bambos Charalambous MP (Labour)	Enfield Southgate	Hansard

== 2015-2017 Parliament ==
Members were announced on 20 July 2015.

Member	Party	Constituency
Jake Berry MP	Conservative	Rossendale and Darwen
Clive Betts MP	Labour	Sheffield South East
Nick Brown MP	Labour	Newcastle upon Tyne East
Geoffrey Clifton-Brown MP	Conservative	The Cotswolds
Mark Garnier MP	Conservative	Wyre Forest
Neil Gray MP	SNP	Airdrie and Shotts
Sir Alan Haselhurst MP	Conservative	Saffron Walden
Lindsay Hoyle MP	Labour	Chorley
Helen Jones MP	Labour	Warrington North
Kwasi Kwarteng MP	Conservative	Spelthorne
Karen Lumley MP	Conservative	Redditch

=== Changes 2015-2017 ===
Date	Outgoing Member & Party	Constituency	→	New Member & Party	Constituency	Source
17 October 2016	Nick Brown MP (Labour)	Newcastle upon Tyne East	→	Dame Rosie Winterton MP (Labour)	Doncaster Central	Hansard
7 November 2016	Helen Jones MP (Labour)	Warrington North	→	Sir Alan Meale MP (Labour)	Mansfield	Hansard
19 December 2016	Mark Garnier MP (Conservative)	Wyre Forest	→	Mark Menzies MP (Conservative)	Fylde	Hansard
16 January 2017	Jake Berry MP (Conservative)	Rossendale and Darwen	→	Stephen McPartland MP (Conservative)	Stevenage	Hansard
6 February 2017	Kwasi Kwarteng MP (Conservative)	Spelthorne	→	William Wragg MP (Conservative)	Hazel Grove	Hansard

== 2010-2015 Parliament ==
Members were announced on 26 July 2010.

Member	Party	Constituency
Sir Paul Beresford MP	Conservative	Mole Valley
Luciana Berger MP	Labour and Co-op	Liverpool Wavertree
Geoffrey Clifton-Brown MP	Conservative	The Cotswolds
Robert Flello MP	Liberal Democrats	Stoke-on-Trent South
James Gray MP	Conservative	North Wiltshire
Sir Alan Haselhurst MP	Conservative	Saffron Walden
Lindsay Hoyle MP	Labour	Chorley
Brooks Newmark MP	Conservative	Braintree
Jonathan Reynolds MP	Labour and Co-op	Stalybridge and Hyde
John Thurso MP	Liberal Democrats	Caithness, Sutherland and Easter Ross
Iain Wright MP	Labour	Hartlepool

=== Changes 2010-2015 ===
Date	Outgoing Member & Party	Constituency	→	New Member & Party	Constituency	Source
8 November 2010	Luciana Berger MP (Labour Co-op)	Liverpool Wavertree	→	Clive Betts MP (Labour)	Sheffield South East	Hansard
14 November 2011	Brooks Newmark MP (Conservative)	Braintree	→	Shailesh Vara MP (Conservative)	North West Cambridgeshire	Hansard
30 January 2012	Jonathan Reynolds MP (Labour Co-op)	Stalybridge and Hyde	→	George Howarth MP (Labour)	Knowsley	Hansard
14 January 2013	Shailesh Vara MP (Conservative)	North West Cambridgeshire	→	Greg Knight MP (Conservative)	Derby North	Hansard
10 December 2013	James Gray MP (Conservative)	North Wiltshire	→	Robert Syms MP (Conservative)	Poole	Hansard

== See also ==
- Parliamentary committees of the United Kingdom
