= History of parliamentary constituencies and boundaries in Durham =

County Durham MP allocation chronology

The county of Durham (including the Borough of Darlington) returned 7 MPs to the UK Parliament from 1983 to 2024. Under the 2023 review of Westminster constituencies, coming into effect for the 2024 general election, the boundary commission proposed that one constituency be shared with the county of Tyne and Wear. In addition, the unitary authority of Darlington, which had previously been included with Durham, was now included with the four unitary authorities which make up the former county of Cleveland. For the purposes of this series of articles, Darlington continues to be included with Durham.

Under the Local Government Act 1972, which came into effect on 1 April 1974, the boundaries of the historic/administrative county were significantly altered with the north-east of the county, comprising more than half the electorate, being transferred to the new metropolitan county of Tyne and Wear. In addition, the boroughs of Hartlepool and Stockton-on-Tees were included in the new county of Cleveland. These changes were reflected in the following redistribution of parliamentary seats which did not come into effect until the 1983 general election, resulting in a reduction in the county's representation from 16 to 7 MPs.

== Number of seats ==
The table below shows the number of MPs representing Durham at each major redistribution of seats affecting the county.

Year	County seats^{1}	Borough seats^{1}	Total
Historic County
Prior to 1832	2	2	4
1832–1868	4	6	10
1868–1885	4	9	13
1885–1918	8	8	16
1918–1950	11	7	18
1950–1955	10	8	18
1955–1974	9	9	18
1974	7	9	16
Current County
1974–1983^{2}	6	1	7
1983–2024	6	1	7
2024–present^{3}	7	–	7

^{1}Prior to 1950, seats were classified as county divisions or parliamentary boroughs. Since 1950, they have been classified as county or borough constituencies.

^{2}Approximate equivalent number of constituencies. Prior to the redistribution coming into effect for the 1983 general election, two constituencies were split between Durham and Tyne and Wear, one was split between Durham and Cleveland and four were wholly within the reconfigured county.

^{3}Approximate equivalent number of constituencies. Six constituencies wholly within Durham (including Darlington); one shared with Tyne and Wear; and one shared with the former county of Cleveland.

== Constituencies timeline ==
County seat Borough seat

Constituency	Prior to 1832	1832–1868	1868–1885	1885–1918	1918–1950	1950–1974	1974–1983	1983–2024	2024–present
Durham (County)	1675–1832 (2 MPs)								
North Durham		1832–1885 (2 MPs)							
Blaydon					1918→		Part of Tyne and Wear from 1974		
Gateshead		1832–1950					Part of Tyne and Wear from 1974		
Gateshead West						1950→	Part of Tyne and Wear from 1974		
Gateshead East						1950→	Part of Tyne and Wear from 1974		
Jarrow				1885–1955		1955→	Part of Tyne and Wear from 1974		
South Shields		1832→					Part of Tyne and Wear from 1974		
Sunderland		1832–1950 (2 MPs)					Part of Tyne and Wear from 1974		
Sunderland North						1950→	Part of Tyne and Wear from 1974		
Sunderland South						1950→	Part of Tyne and Wear from 1974		
Houghton-le-Spring				1885→			Part of Tyne and Wear from 1974		
North West Durham				1885–1918		1950–2024			
Consett					1918–1983				
Blaydon and Consett (part)									2024–present
Chester-le-Street				1885–1983					
North Durham								1983–present	
Mid Durham				1885–1918					
Durham (City)	1678–1885 (2 MPs)			1885–1918	1918–present				
Spennymoor					1918–1950				
South Durham		1832–1885 (2 MPs)							
Barnard Castle				1885–1950					
Bishop Auckland				1885–present					
South East Durham				1885–1918					
Seaham					1918–1950				
Easington						1950–present			
Newton Aycliffe and Spennymoor									2024–present
Sedgefield					1918–1974			1983–2024	
Darlington			1868–2024						2024–present
Stockton West (part)									2024–present
Stockton-on-Tees^{1}			1868→				Part of Cleveland from 1974		
The Hartlepools^{2}			1868→				Part of Cleveland from 1974		
Constituency	Prior to 1832	1832–1868	1868–1885	1885–1918	1918–1950	1950–1974	1974–1983	1983–2024	2024–present

^{1}Part of the North Riding of Yorkshire from 1966 to 1974 (Teesside, Stockton)

^{2}Renamed Hartlepool in 1974

== Boundary reviews ==
=== Before 1832 ===
As a county palatine, Durham had been unrepresented in the House of Commons until 1673, when the County of Durham and the Parliamentary Borough of Durham, both electing 2 MPs, were enfranchised by Act of Parliament.

=== 1832 ===
The Great Reform Act 1832 radically changed the representation of the House of Commons, with the County being divided into the Northern and Southern Divisions, both returning 2 MPs. In addition, Sunderland (2 MPs), Gateshead and South Shields were created as Parliamentary Boroughs.

=== 1868 ===
Under the Reform Act 1867, three additional single-member Boroughs were created, namely Darlington, The Hartlepools (Hartlepool and West Hartlepool) and Stockton-on-Tees (which also included the township of Thornaby in the North Riding of Yorkshire).

=== 1885 ===
Under the Redistribution of Seats Act 1885, the two 2-member county divisions were replaced by eight single-member divisions, namely Chester-le-Street, Jarrow, Houghton-le-Spring, North-Western, Mid, South-Eastern, Bishop Auckland and Barnard Castle. The representation of the Borough of Durham was reduced to 1 MP.

=== 1918 ===
Under the Representation of the People Act 1918, the number of constituencies in Durham was increased further, from 16 to 18, which resulted in significant boundary changes.

The Parliamentary Borough of Durham was abolished and was absorbed into a new County seat which also included northern areas of the abolished constituency of Mid Durham (excluding Witton Gilbert which was transferred to Chester-le-Street). The town of Hetton-le-Hole was transferred from Houghton-le-Spring.

The North Western and South Eastern Divisions were both abolished and five new county seats were established:

- Blaydon – largely created from the western part of Chester-le-Street, including Blaydon, Ryton and Whickham. Also included Tanfield, transferred from North West Durham;
- Consett – created from the bulk of North West Durham, including Annfield Plain, Benfieldside, Consett, Leadgate and Stanley;
- Seaham – created from the majority of South East Durham, including Easington and Seaham Harbour. The town of Seaham was transferred from Houghton-le-Spring;
- Sedgefield – majority, comprising Sedgefield, Billingham and rural areas surrounding the boroughs of Darlington, Stockton-on-Tees and The Hartlepools, was previously part of South East Durham. Also included small areas transferred from Mid Durham (Ferryhill) and Bishop Auckland; and
- Spennymoor – comprising Brandon and Willington from Mid Durham, Crook and Tow Law from Barnard Castle, and Spennymoor from Bishop Auckland.

Other changes included:

- parts of Jarrow transferred to South Shields and Houghton-le-Spring (Boldon);
- rural areas in the south and west of North West Durham added to Barnard Castle;
- small rural area transferred from Barnard Castle to Bishop Auckland; and
- expansion of the boundaries of the boroughs of Darlington, Stockton-on-Tees (including Thornaby-on-Tees), Sunderland and The Hartlepools to match those of the corresponding local authority boroughs.

=== 1950 ===
As a result of the redistribution enacted by the Representation of the People Act 1948, Durham's representation remained at 18 MPs.

The County Boroughs of Darlington, Gateshead, South Shields, Sunderland and West Hartlepool had all expanded since 1918 and the parliamentary boundaries were adjusted accordingly. Gateshead was split into Gateshead East and Gateshead West and the 2-member borough of Sunderland was split into Sunderland North and Sunderland South.

Three county constituencies were abolished being replaced by two new ones:

- Spennymoor – the urban district of Spennymoor was transferred to Durham, with the remainder forming the basis of the re-established constituency of North West Durham;
- Barnard Castle – northern areas (Lanchester and Weardale) added to North West Durham and southern areas (Barnard Castle and surrounding rural areas) transferred to Bishop Auckland; and
- Seaham – the urban district of Seaham was transferred to Houghton-le-Spring, with the remainder forming the new constituency of Easington.

Other changes included:

- Boldon returned to Jarrow from Houghton-le-Spring;
- Tanfield transferred from Blaydon to Consett; and
- Thornaby-on-Tees transferred from Stockton-on-Tees to the North Riding of Yorkshire constituency of Middlesbrough West.

=== 1955 ===
Under the first periodic review of Westminster constituencies, the urban district of Felling was transferred from Jarrow to Gateshead East and two Gateshead borough wards were transferred from Gateshead East to Gateshead West. Jarrow was redesignated as a borough constituency.

=== 1974 (Feb) ===
The Second Periodic Review, which came into effect for the February 1974 election, resulted in the number of MPs representing Durham falling from 18 to 16.

The borough of Stockton-on-Tees had been absorbed into the County Borough of Teesside in 1966 and was now part of the North Riding of Yorkshire.

The constituency of Sedgefield was abolished and its contents distributed as follows:

- Billingham was also absorbed into the County Borough of Teesside and it was added to Stockton-on-Tees to form the North Riding of Yorkshire constituency of Teesside, Stockton;
- rural areas to the west of Stockton and Hartlepool added to Easington;
- rural areas around Darlington added to Bishop Auckland; and
- Sedgefield and surrounding areas added to Durham.

Other changes included:

- Spennymoor transferred from Durham to North West Durham;
- Hetton-le-Hole transferred back from Durham to Houghton-le-Spring;
- Murton transferred from Easington to Houghton-le-Spring;
- Following the expansion of the County Borough of Sunderland, Sunderland South gained parts of Houghton-le-Spring and the boundary between Sunderland North and Sunderland South was realigned;
- Blaydon was redesignated as a borough constituency; and
- The Hartlepools was renamed Hartlepool following the amalgamation of the boroughs of Hartlepool and West Hartlepool.

=== 1974 (Apr) ===
Shortly after the Second Periodic Review came into effect, the county was subject to a major reconfiguration under the terms of the Local Government Act 1972. As a result, with effect from 1 April 1974, the constituencies of Blaydon, Gateshead West, Gateshead East, Jarrow, South Shields, Sunderland North, Sunderland South, most of Houghton-le-Spring and part of Chester-le-Street were now included in the new metropolitan county of Tyne and Wear. In addition, Hartlepool and part of Easington were now included in the new non-metropolitan county of Cleveland.

=== 1983 ===
The next change to parliamentary constituency boundaries, following the recommendations of the Third Periodic Review, reflected the change in county boundaries and reorganisation of local government authorities in 1974. This review did not come into effect for a further nine years, at the 1983 general election, and resulted in the following changes:

- Chester-le-Street was abolished. The new town of Washington (now part of the borough of Sunderland) was included in the new Tyne and Wear constituency of Houghton and Washington and the parishes of Birtley and Lamesley (now part of the borough of Gateshead) was added to Blaydon. Remaining areas, including the town of Chester-le-Street were included in the new constituency of North Durham;
- Consett was abolished. Eastern areas (former urban district of Stanley) were added to North Durham. Western areas (former urban district of Consett) were transferred to North West Durham;
- areas of the abolished constituency of Houghton-le-Spring which were retained within Durham (Seaham and Murton) were transferred back to Easington;
- southern parts of Easington (former rural district of Stockton) were now part of Cleveland and split between Hartlepool and the new constituencies of Stockton North and Stockton South;
- Sedgefield was re-established with similar boundaries to the pre-1974 constituencies, but now included Spennymoor, transferred from North West Durham, but excluding the new town of Newton Aycliffe, which was retained in Bishop Auckland;
- Brandon was transferred from North West Durham to Durham (now officially designated as the City of Durham): and
- The sparsely populated area comprising the former Rural District of Startforth, which had been transferred from the North Riding of Yorkshire to Durham, added to Bishop Auckland.

=== 1997 ===
There were a limited number of changes under the Fourth Review:

- Two District of Derwentside wards were transferred from North Durham to North West Durham; and
- Spennymoor was transferred from Sedgefield to Bishop Auckland in exchange for Newton Aycliffe.

=== 2010 ===
At the Fifth Review there were only minor changes due to the revision of local authority ward boundaries.

=== 2024 ===
For the 2023 review of Westminster constituencies, which redrew the constituency map ahead of the 2024 United Kingdom general election, the Boundary Commission for England opted to combine the unitary authority of Durham with the Tyne and Wear metropolitan boroughs of Gateshead, South Tyneside and Sunderland as a sub-region of the North East Region. Darlington was included in a sub-region comprising the Tees Valley Combined Authority.

The cross-county boundary constituency of Blaydon and Consett was created, comprising approximately equal parts of the electorates of the abolished constituencies of Blaydon in Tyne and Wear and North West Durham in Durham. The remainder of North West Durham was distributed to Bishop Auckland (Crook, Tow Law and Weardale), City of Durham (Willington) and North Durham (Lanchester).

The constituency of Sedgefield was abolished once again, with the majority of its electorate being incorporated into the new seat of Newton Aycliffe and Spennymoor, including the towns of Newton Aycliffe and Sedgefield. Spennymoor was added from Bishop Auckland and Cuxhoe from City of Durham. Rural areas of the borough of Darlington were transferred to the Darlington constituency (resulting in it being re-designated as a county constituency) and the cross-boundary seat of Stockton West.

== Maps ==
1885–1918

1918–1950

1955–1974

1974–1983

1983–1997

2010–2024

2024–present

== Communities timeline ==
The table below shows which constituencies represented major communities within the current county (including Darlington) from 1885 onwards.

Town	1885–1918	1918–1950	1950–1974	1974–1983	1983–1997	1997–2024	2024–present
Annfield Plain	North West Durham	Consett			North Durham		
Barnard Castle	Barnard Castle		Bishop Auckland				
Bishop Auckland	Bishop Auckland						
Brandon	Mid Durham	Spennymoor	North West Durham		City of Durham		
Chester-le-Street	Chester-le-Street				North Durham		
Consett	North West Durham	Consett			North West Durham		Blaydon and Consett
Crook	Barnard Castle	Spennymoor	North West Durham				Bishop Auckland
Darlington	Darlington						
Durham	City of Durham						
Easington	South East Durham	Seaham	Easington				
Ferryhill	Mid Durham	Sedgefield		City of Durham	Sedgefield		Newton Aycliffe and Spennymoor
Lanchester	North West Durham	Barnard Castle	North West Durham				North Durham
Murton	Houghton-le-Spring	Seaham	Easington	Houghton-le-Spring	Easington		
Newton Aycliffe	South East Durham	Sedgefield		Bishop Auckland		Sedgefield	Newton Aycliffe and Spennymoor
Peterlee	South East Durham	Seaham	Easington				
Seaham	Houghton-le-Spring	Seaham	Houghton-le-Spring		Easington		
Sedgefield	South East Durham	Sedgefield		City of Durham	Sedgefield		Newton Aycliffe and Spennymoor
Shildon	Bishop Auckland						
Spennymoor	Bishop Auckland	Spennymoor	City of Durham	North West Durham	Sedgefield	Bishop Auckland	Newton Aycliffe and Spennymoor
Stanley	North West Durham	Consett			North Durham		
Willington	Mid Durham	Spennymoor	North West Durham				City of Durham
Town	1885–1918	1918–1950	1950–1974	1974–1983	1983–1997	1997–2024	2024–present

== See also ==
- List of parliamentary constituencies in County Durham
- History of parliamentary constituencies and boundaries in Tyne and Wear
