= Parliamentary constituencies in North East England =

List of parliamentary constituencies in the North East region, England

The region of North East England is divided into 27 parliamentary constituencies which is made up of 11 borough constituencies and 16 county constituencies. Since the 2024 general election, 26 are represented by Labour MPs and one by a Conservative MP.

== Constituencies ==
† Conservative ‡ Labour # Reform UK

Constituency (Note: BC denotes borough constituency, CC denotes county constituency.)	Electorate	Majority (Note: The majority is the number of votes the winning candidate receives more than their nearest rival.)	Member of Parliament	Nearest opposition	County	Constituency Map
Bishop Auckland CC	70,745	6,672	Sam Rushworth‡	Jane MacBean†	County Durham	
Blaydon and Consett CC	70,487	11,153	Liz Twist‡	David Ayre#	County Durham / Tyne and Wear	
Blyth and Ashington CC	76,263	9,173	Ian Lavery‡	Mark Peart#	Northumberland	
City of Durham CC	70,582	11,757	Mary Foy‡	Mark Belch#	County Durham	
Cramlington and Killingworth CC	76,228	12,820	Emma Foody‡	Gordon Fletcher#	Northumberland / Tyne and Wear	
Darlington CC	70,763	2,298	Lola McEvoy‡	Peter Gibson†	County Durham	
Easington CC	69,411	6,542	Grahame Morris‡	Lynn Murphy#	County Durham	
Gateshead Central and Whickham BC	69,827	9,644	Mark Ferguson‡	Damian Heslop#	Tyne and Wear	
Hartlepool CC	71,437	7,698	Jonathan Brash‡	Amanda Napper#	County Durham (prev. Cleveland)	
Hexham CC	76,431	3,713	Joe Morris‡	Guy Opperman†	Northumberland	
Houghton and Sunderland South BC	78,448	7,168	Bridget Phillipson‡	Sam Woods-Brass#	Tyne and Wear	
Jarrow and Gateshead East BC	70,272	8,946	Kate Osborne‡	Lynda Alexandra#	Tyne and Wear	
Middlesbrough and Thornaby East BC	75,123	9,192	Andy McDonald‡	Patrick Seargeant#	North Yorkshire (prev. Cleveland)	
Middlesbrough South and East Cleveland CC	70,328	214	Luke Myer‡	Simon Clarke†	North Yorkshire (prev. Cleveland)	
Newcastle upon Tyne Central and West BC	76,969	11,060	Chi Onwurah‡	Ashton Muncaster#	Tyne and Wear	
Newcastle upon Tyne East and Wallsend BC	76,425	12,817	Mary Glindon‡	Janice Richardson#	Tyne and Wear	
Newcastle upon Tyne North BC	75,146	17,762	Catherine McKinnell‡	Guy Renner-Thompson†	Tyne and Wear	
Newton Aycliffe and Spennymoor CC	72,224	8,839	Alan Strickland‡	John Grant#	County Durham	
North Durham CC	73,235	5,873	Luke Akehurst‡	Andrew Husband#	County Durham	
North Northumberland CC	74,132	5,067	David Smith‡	Anne-Marie Trevelyan†	Northumberland	
Redcar BC	70,241	3,323	Anna Turley‡	Jacob Young†	North Yorkshire (prev. Cleveland)	
South Shields BC	68,366	6,653	Emma Lewell-Buck‡	Steve Holt#	Tyne and Wear	
Stockton North BC	70,242	7,939	Chris McDonald‡	John McDermottroe#	County Durham (prev. Cleveland)	
Stockton West CC	71,868	2,139	Matt Vickers†	Joe Dancey‡	County Durham (prev. Cleveland) / North Yorkshire	
Sunderland Central BC	76,145	6,073	Lewis Atkinson‡	Chris Eynon#	Tyne and Wear	
Tynemouth BC	73,469	15,455	Alan Campbell‡	Lewis Bartoli†	Tyne and Wear	
Washington and Gateshead South BC	70,972	6,913	Sharon Hodgson‡	Paul Donaghy#	Tyne and Wear	

== 2023 boundary changes ==
See 2023 review of Westminster constituencies for further details.

Following the abandonment of the Sixth Periodic Review (the 2018 review), the Boundary Commission for England formally launched the 2023 Review on 5 January 2021. The Commission calculated that the number of seats to be allocated to the North East region would be decreased by two, from 29 to 27. Initial proposals were published on 8 June 2021 and, following two periods of public consultation, revised proposals were published on 8 November 2022. The final proposals were published on 28 June 2023.

Under the revised proposals, the following constituencies for the region came into effect at the 2024 general election:

Constituency	Electorate	Ceremonial county	Local authority
Bishop Auckland CC	70,879	Durham	County Durham
Blaydon and Consett CC	70,163	Durham / Tyne and Wear	County Durham / Gateshead
Blyth and Ashington CC	75,452	Northumberland	Northumberland
City of Durham CC	72,878	Durham	County Durham
Cramlington and Killingworth CC	73,295	Northumberland / Tyne and Wear	Newcastle upon Tyne / North Tyneside / Northumberland
Darlington CC	70,446	Durham	Darlington
Easington CC	70,043	Durham	County Durham
Gateshead Central and Whickham BC	70,994	Tyne and Wear	Gateshead
Hartlepool CC	71,228	Durham	Hartlepool
Hexham CC	72,738	Northumberland / Tyne and Wear	Newcastle upon Tyne / Northumberland
Houghton and Sunderland South CC	76,883	Tyne and Wear	Sunderland
Jarrow and Gateshead East BC	71,106	Tyne and Wear	Gateshead / South Tyneside
Middlesbrough and Thornaby East BC	71,742	North Yorkshire	Middlesbrough / Stockton-on-Tees
Middlesbrough South and East Cleveland CC	69,967	North Yorkshire	Middlesbrough / Redcar and Cleveland
Newcastle upon Tyne Central and West BC	76,460	Tyne and Wear	Newcastle upon Tyne
Newcastle upon Tyne East and Wallsend BC	76,875	Tyne and Wear	Newcastle upon Tyne / North Tyneside
Newcastle upon Tyne North BC	76,503	Tyne and Wear	Newcastle upon Tyne / North Tyneside
Newton Aycliffe and Spennymoor CC	71,299	Durham	County Durham
North Durham CC	73,079	Durham	County Durham
North Northumberland CC	72,541	Northumberland	Northumberland
Redcar BC	71,331	North Yorkshire	Redcar and Cleveland
South Shields BC	69,725	Tyne and Wear	South Tyneside
Stockton North CC	69,779	Durham	Stockton-on-Tees
Stockton West CC	70,108	Durham / North Yorkshire	Darlington / Stockton-on-Tees
Sunderland Central BC	72,688	Tyne and Wear	Sunderland
Tynemouth BC	73,022	Tyne and Wear	North Tyneside
Washington and Gateshead South BC	71,775	Tyne and Wear	Gateshead / Sunderland

== 2024 results ==
The number of votes cast for each political party who fielded candidates in constituencies comprising the North East region in the 2024 general election were as follows:

Party	Votes	%	Change from 2019	Seats	Change from 2019 (actual)	Change from 2019 (notional)
Labour	504,569	45.4	▲2.8	26	▲7	▲7
Conservative	224,584	20.2	▼18.0	1	▼9	▼7
Reform UK	220,875	19.9	▲11.8	0	0	0
Green	66,680	6.0	▲3.6	0	0	0
Liberal Democrats	65,385	5.9	▼0.9	0	0	0
Others	29,447	2.6	▲0.8	0	0	0
Total	1,111,540	100.0		27	▼2	

== Results history ==
Primary data source: House of Commons research briefing – General election results from 1918 to 2019

=== Percentage votes ===
North East votes %

Key:

- CON – Conservative Party, including National Liberal Party up to 1966
- LAB – Labour Party, including Labour and Co-operative Party
- LIB – Liberal Party up to 1979; SDP–Liberal Alliance 1983 & 1987; Liberal Democrats from 1992
- UKIP – UK Independence Party 2010 to 2017 (included in Other up to 2005 and from 2019)
- REF – Reform UK (2019 – Brexit Party)
- GRN – Green Party of England and Wales (included in Other up to 2005)

=== Seats ===
North East seats

Key:

- CON – Conservative Party, including National Liberal Party up to 1966
- LAB – Labour Party, including Labour and Co-operative Party
- LIB – Liberal Party up to 1979; SDP–Liberal Alliance 1983 & 1987; Liberal Democrats from 1992
- OTH – 1974 (Feb) – Independent Labour (Eddie Milne)

== See also ==
- Constituencies of the Parliament of the United Kingdom
- Parliamentary constituencies in Cleveland
- Parliamentary constituencies in County Durham
- Parliamentary constituencies in Northumberland
- Parliamentary constituencies in Tyne and Wear
