= Washington and Sunderland West =

UK Parliament constituency (2010–2024)

Coordinates: 54.891°N 1.499°W

- Former borough constituency for the House of Commons
- Boundary of Washington and Sunderland West in Tyne and Wear for the 2010 general election

- Location of Tyne and Wear within England
- County: Tyne and Wear
- Electorate: 70,177 (December 2010)

2010–2024
- Created from: Houghton and Washington East, Gateshead East and Washington West, Sunderland North, Sunderland South
- Replaced by: Washington and Gateshead South

Washington and Sunderland West was a constituency (Note: A borough constituency (for the purposes of election expenses and type of returning officer)) in Tyne and Wear represented in the House of Commons of the UK Parliament since its 2010 creation until its abolition for the 2024 general election by Sharon Hodgson, a member of the Labour Party. (Note: As with all constituencies, the constituency elects one Member of Parliament (MP) by the first past the post system of election at least every five years.)

Under the 2023 review of Westminster constituencies, the seat was abolished. Subject to moderate boundary changes - including losing the St Anne's ward to Houghton and Sunderland South, and gaining the Borough of Gateshead wards of Birtley and Lamesley from the (abolished) constituency of Blaydon - it was reformed as Washington and Gateshead South.

== Constituency profile ==
The town of Washington has a well-preserved historic centre with a museum dedicated to the first US president, on its outskirts, the family home of George Washington. Residents have lower levels of wealth and education than UK averages.

== Boundaries ==
Map of boundaries 2010–2024

The City of Sunderland wards of Castle, Redhill, St Anne's, Washington Central, Washington East, Washington North, Washington South, Washington West.

Washington and Sunderland West was created for the 2010 general election when the Boundary Commission reduced the number of seats in Tyne and Wear from 13 to 12, with the constituencies in the City of Sunderland, in particular, being reorganised. The constituency was formed from parts of four abolished constituencies:

- Castle and Redhill wards from Sunderland North;
- St Anne's ward from Sunderland South;
- Washington Central, East and North from Houghton and Washington East; and
- Washington South and West from Gateshead East and Washington West.

== Political history ==
All of the predecessor seats were held with majorities exceeding 5,000 votes and 5% of the vote before the 2010 election. Electoral calculus, an academic website, gave a provisional ranking as the 28th-safest Labour seat in the United Kingdom, and the 11th-safest Labour seat in England based on the results of 2005.

== Members of Parliament ==
| Election | Member | Party |
|---|---|---|
| 2010 | Sharon Hodgson | Labour |

Selection of first MP

Following a ballot of members on 8 September 2007 Sharon Hodgson MP was selected as the Labour candidate, she represented 38% of the new seat which came from her previous seat of Gateshead East and Washington West which was abolished.

== Elections ==
=== Elections in the 2010s ===
General election 2019: Washington and Sunderland West
| Party | Candidate | Votes | % | ±% |
|---|---|---|---|---|
| Labour | Sharon Hodgson | 15,941 | 42.5 | −18.2 |
| Conservative | Valerie Allen | 12,218 | 32.6 | +3.8 |
| Brexit Party | Howard Brown | 5,439 | 14.5 | +14.5 |
| Liberal Democrats | Carlton West | 2,071 | 5.5 | +3.1 |
| Green | Michal Chantkowski | 1,005 | 2.7 | +1.4 |
| UKIP | Keith Jenkins | 839 | 2.2 | −4.6 |
| Majority | | 3,723 | 9.9 | −22.0 |
| Turnout | | 37,513 | 56.6 | −3.7 |
| Labour hold | | Swing | −11.0 | |

General election 2017: Washington and Sunderland West
| Party | Candidate | Votes | % | ±% |
|---|---|---|---|---|
| Labour | Sharon Hodgson | 24,639 | 60.7 | +5.7 |
| Conservative | Jonathan Gullis | 11,699 | 28.8 | +9.9 |
| UKIP | Bryan Foster | 2,761 | 6.8 | −12.8 |
| Liberal Democrats | Thomas Appleby | 961 | 2.4 | −0.3 |
| Green | Michal Chantkowski | 514 | 1.3 | −1.6 |
| Majority | | 12,940 | 31.9 | −3.5 |
| Turnout | | 40,574 | 60.3 | +5.7 |
| Labour hold | | Swing | −2.1 | |

General election 2015: Washington and Sunderland West
| Party | Candidate | Votes | % | ±% |
|---|---|---|---|---|
| Labour | Sharon Hodgson | 20,478 | 55.0 | +2.5 |
| UKIP | Aileen Casey | 7,321 | 19.6 | +16.3 |
| Conservative | Bob Dhillon | 7,033 | 18.9 | −2.9 |
| Green | Anthony Murphy | 1,091 | 2.9 | New |
| Liberal Democrats | Dominic Haney | 993 | 2.7 | −14.4 |
| TUSC | Gary Duncan | 341 | 0.9 | New |
| Majority | | 13,157 | 35.4 | +4.7 |
| Turnout | | 37,257 | 54.6 | +1.4 |
| Labour hold | | Swing | | |

For 2015, the British National Party announced Pauline Renwick as a candidate, but she failed to stand.

General election 2010: Washington and Sunderland West
| Party | Candidate | Votes | % | ±% |
|---|---|---|---|---|
| Labour | Sharon Hodgson* | 19,615 | 52.5 | −16.2 |
| Conservative | Ian Cuthbert | 8,157 | 21.8 | +6.9 |
| Liberal Democrats | Peter Andras | 6,382 | 17.1 | +0.9 |
| BNP | Ian McDonald | 1,913 | 5.1 | New |
| UKIP | Linda Hudson | 1,267 | 3.3 | New |
| Majority | | 11,458 | 30.7 | |
| Turnout | | 37,334 | 53.2 | +6.8 |
| Labour hold | | Swing | −11.6 | |

* Served as an MP for Gateshead East and Washington West in the 2005–2010 Parliament

2010 vote share changes and swing are based on notional results (a calculation of how the seat would have voted if it had existed at the previous election).

== See also ==
- Constituencies of the Parliament of the United Kingdom
- Parliamentary constituencies in Tyne and Wear
- History of parliamentary constituencies and boundaries in Tyne and Wear
- Houghton and Sunderland South
- Sunderland Central
