= Washington and Gateshead South =

UK Parliament constituency (since 2024)

Coordinates: 54.905°N 1.56°W

- Borough constituency for the House of Commons
- Interactive map of boundaries since 2024
- Location within North East England
- County: County Durham
- Electorate: 71,775 (March 2020)
- Major settlements: Washington; Birtley

Current constituency
- Created: 2024
- Member of Parliament: Sharon Hodgson (Labour)
- Seats: One
- Created from: Washington and Sunderland West; Blaydon (part)

Washington and Gateshead South is a constituency of the House of Commons in the UK Parliament. Created as a result of the 2023 review of Westminster constituencies, it was first contested at the 2024 general election and is currently held by Sharon Hodgson of the Labour Party. Hodgson was MP for the predecessor seats of Washington and Sunderland West from 2010 to 2024 and Gateshead East and Washington West from 2005 to 2010.

== Boundaries ==
Further to the 2023 boundary review, the constituency was defined as composing the following from the 2024 general election (as they existed on 1 December 2020):

- The Metropolitan Borough of Gateshead wards of: Birtley; Lamesley.
- The City of Sunderland wards of: Castle; Redhill; Washington Central; Washington East; Washington North; Washington South; Washington West.

The constituency was formed primarily from the bulk of the abolished Washington and Sunderland West constituency, with the addition of the Borough of Gateshead wards of Birtley and Lamesley from Blaydon (abolished).

Further to local government boundary reviews in both local authorities which came into effect in May 2026, the constituency now comprises the following:

- The Metropolitan Borough of Gateshead wards of: Birtley North & Lamesley; Birtley South.
- The City of Sunderland wards of: Hylton Castle; Redhouse (virtually all); Washington Central; Washington East; Washington North; Washington South; Washington West.

== Members of Parliament ==
Washington and Sunderland West prior to 2024

Election	Member	Party
2024	Sharon Hodgson	Labour

== Elections ==
=== Elections in the 2020s ===
General election 2024: Washington and Gateshead South
Party	Candidate	Votes	%	±%
Labour	Sharon Hodgson	17,682	47.8	+4.7
Reform	Paul Donaghy	10,769	29.1	+15.3
Conservative	Shaun Parsons	4,654	12.6	−21.1
Green	Michal Chantkowski	1,687	4.6	+1.9
Liberal Democrats	Ciaran Morrissey	1,602	4.3	−0.6
Independent	Sharon McLafferty	627	1.7	N/A
Majority		6,913	18.7	
Turnout		37,021	52.2	−6.3
Labour hold		Swing		

=== Elections in the 2010s ===
2019 notional result
Party	Vote	%
Labour	18,090	43.1
Conservative	14,152	33.7
Brexit	5,784	13.8
Liberal Democrats	2,067	4.9
Green	1,122	2.7
UKIP	739	1.8
Turnout	41,954	58.5
Electorate	71,775	

== See also ==
- Parliamentary constituencies in Tyne and Wear
- Parliamentary constituencies in North East England
