= North Tyneside (constituency) =

UK Parliament constituency (1997–2024)

- Former borough constituency for the House of Commons
- 2010–2024 boundary of North Tyneside in Tyne and Wear

- Location of Tyne and Wear within England
- County: Tyne and Wear
- Electorate: 78,617 (December 2010)

1997–2024
- Seats: One
- Created from: Tynemouth and Wallsend
- Replaced by: Newcastle upon Tyne East and Wallsend; Cramlington and Killingworth (part); Newcastle upon Tyne North (part); Tynemouth (minor part)

North Tyneside was a constituency (Note: A borough constituency (for the purposes of election expenses and type of returning officer)) represented in the House of Commons of the UK Parliament since its creation in 1997 until its abolition for the 2024 general election by members of the Labour Party. (Note: As with all constituencies, the constituency elects one Member of Parliament (MP) by the first past the post system of election at least every five years.)

Under the 2023 Periodic Review of Westminster constituencies, the contents of the abolished seat were distributed to four neighbouring constituencies.

== History ==
This seat was represented from its creation in 1997 by Stephen Byers of the Labour Party, who before that election represented the abolished seat of Wallsend from 1992. Byers stood down at the 2010 general election and his party selected local councillor Mary Glindon as their new candidate for the general election, which she won with a majority of 12,884.

=== Abolition ===
Further to the completion of the 2023 Periodic Review of Westminster constituencies, the seat was abolished for the 2024 general election, with its contents distributed between Tynemouth, Newcastle upon Tyne North, re-established Newcastle upon Tyne East and Wallsend, and newly created Cramlington and Killingworth as following:

Parts	New constituency	Part of North Tyneside, %
Battle Hill, Howdon, Northumberland and Wallsend wards	Newcastle upon Tyne East and Wallsend	42.4
Camperdown, Killingworth and Weetslade wards	Cramlington and Killingworth	29.0
Benton, Longbenton wards	Newcastle upon Tyne North	19.6
Majority of Riverside ward	Tynemouth	9.0

== Constituency profile ==
This constituency formed north-east suburbs to the largest city in the region, Newcastle-upon-Tyne. At the end of 2010, unemployment still reflected a slightly less strong economy than in the city's shipbuilding heyday and stood in this seat alone at 5.7% by claimant count, compared to a regional average of 5.5%, significantly lower than South Shields' 7.7%. As to the male only claimant total, this amounted to 7.8%, just part of a significant region-wide disparity but significantly lower than Middlesbrough's 12.8%, however both sets of figures were a little higher than the national average — Greater London saw an average of 4.1% and for men a proportion of 4.9%.

== Boundaries ==
Map of 2010–2024 boundaries

1997–2010: The Borough of North Tyneside wards of Battle Hill, Benton, Camperdown, Holystone, Howdon, Longbenton, Riverside, Valley, and Weetslade.

Apart from Riverside ward, which was transferred from Tynemouth, the constituency was formed from the majority of the abolished Wallsend constituency.

2010–2024: The Borough of North Tyneside wards of Battle Hill, Benton, Camperdown, Howdon, Killingworth, Longbenton, Northumberland, Riverside, Wallsend, and Weetslade.

The Wallsend and Northumberland wards moved from Newcastle upon Tyne East and Wallsend which was abolished and replaced by the re-established constituency of Newcastle upon Tyne East. Valley ward was transferred to Tynemouth.

== Members of Parliament ==
Election	Member	Party
1997	Stephen Byers	Labour
2010	Mary Glindon	Labour
2024	Constituency abolished	

== Election results 1997–2024 ==
=== Elections in the 1990s ===
1997: Michael McIntyre was Councillor for Whitley Bay Ward 1992–2012.

General election 1997: North Tyneside
Party	Candidate	Votes	%	±%
Labour	Stephen Byers	32,810	72.7	
Conservative	Michael McIntyre	6,167	13.7	
Liberal Democrats	Tommy Mulvenna	4,762	10.6	
Referendum	Michael Rollings	1,382	3.1	
Majority		26,643	59.0	
Turnout		45,121	67.9	
Labour win (new seat)				

=== Elections in the 2000s ===
General election 2001: North Tyneside
Party	Candidate	Votes	%	±%
Labour	Stephen Byers	26,027	69.5	−3.2
Conservative	Mark Ruffell	5,459	14.6	+0.9
Liberal Democrats	Simon Reed	4,649	12.4	+1.8
UKIP	Alan Taylor	770	2.1	New
Socialist Alliance	Pete Burnett	324	0.9	New
Socialist Labour	Kenneth Capstick	240	0.6	New
Majority		20,568	54.9	−4.1
Turnout		37,469	57.7	−10.2
Labour hold		Swing		

2005: Duncan McLellan was Councillor for Weetslade Ward 2005-2012.

General election 2005: North Tyneside
Party	Candidate	Votes	%	±%
Labour	Stephen Byers	22,882	61.9	−7.6
Conservative	Duncan McLellan	7,845	21.2	+6.6
Liberal Democrats	Gillian Ferguson	6,212	16.8	+4.4
Majority		15,037	40.7	−14.2
Turnout		36,939	57.2	−0.5
Labour hold		Swing	−7.1	

=== Elections in the 2010s ===
2010: At this election Mary Glindon was Councillor for Battle Hill Ward, David Ord was Councillor for Northumberland Ward and Gagan Mohindra was District Councillor in Epping Forest, Essex.

General election 2010: North Tyneside
Party	Candidate	Votes	%	±%
Labour	Mary Glindon	23,505	50.7	−8.7
Liberal Democrats	David Ord	10,621	22.9	+0.9
Conservative	Gagan Mohindra	8,514	18.3	−0.3
BNP	John Burrows	1,860	4.0	New
UKIP	Claudia Blake	1,306	2.8	New
National Front	Bob Batten	599	1.3	New
Majority		12,884	27.8	−9.6
Turnout		46,405	59.7	+4.3
Labour hold		Swing	−4.8	

General election 2015: North Tyneside
Party	Candidate	Votes	%	±%
Labour	Mary Glindon	26,191	55.9	+5.2
Conservative	Martin McGann	8,997	19.2	+0.9
UKIP	Scott Hartley	7,618	16.3	+13.5
Liberal Democrats	John Appleby	2,075	4.4	−18.5
Green	Martin Collins	1,442	3.1	New
TUSC	Tim Wall	304	0.6	New
National Front	Bob Batten	191	0.4	−0.9
Majority		17,194	36.7	+8.9
Turnout		46,818	59.0	−0.7
Labour hold		Swing	+2.2	

General election 2017: North Tyneside
Party	Candidate	Votes	%	±%
Labour	Mary Glindon	33,456	64.5	+8.6
Conservative	Henry Newman	14,172	27.3	+8.1
UKIP	Gary Legg	2,101	4.0	−12.3
Liberal Democrats	Greg Stone	1,494	2.9	−1.5
Green	Martin Collins	669	1.3	−1.8
Majority		19,284	37.2	+0.5
Turnout		51,892	65.7	+6.7
Labour hold		Swing	+0.2	

General election 2019: North Tyneside
Party	Candidate	Votes	%	±%
Labour	Mary Glindon	25,051	49.7	−14.8
Conservative	Dean Carroll	15,490	30.7	+3.4
Brexit Party	Andrew Husband	5,254	10.4	New
Liberal Democrats	Chris Boyle	3,241	6.4	+3.5
Green	John Buttery	1,393	2.8	+1.5
Majority		9,561	19.0	−18.2
Turnout		50,429	63.9	−1.8
Labour hold		Swing	−9.1	

== See also ==
- List of parliamentary constituencies in Tyne and Wear
- History of parliamentary constituencies and boundaries in Tyne and Wear
