= Houghton and Sunderland South =

UK Parliament constituency (since 2010)

Coordinates: 54.85°N 1.45°W

- County constituency for the House of Commons
- Interactive map of boundaries since 2024
- Location within North East England
- County: Tyne and Wear
- Electorate: 76,883 (March 2020)

Current constituency
- Created: 2010
- Member of Parliament: Bridget Phillipson (Labour)
- Seats: One
- Created from: Sunderland South, Houghton and Washington East

Houghton and Sunderland South (/ˈhoʊtən/) is a constituency (Note: A borough constituency (for the purposes of election expenses and type of returning officer)) in Tyne and Wear represented in the House of Commons of the Parliament of the United Kingdom. Since its creation in 2010, the seat has been represented by Bridget Phillipson of the Labour Party, (Note: As with all constituencies, the constituency elects one Member of Parliament (MP) by the first past the post system of election at least every five years.) who currently serves as Minister for Women and Equalities and Chair of the Labour Party in the government of Andy Burnham.

In the 2010 and 2015 general elections, it was the first constituency to declare its result, continuing the record of its predecessor seat, Sunderland South, in the four general elections from 1992 to 2005. However, in the 2017 and 2019 general elections, it was beaten by Newcastle upon Tyne Central. It regained the position as first constituency to declare in the 2024 election, while Newcastle ruled itself out of being the first prior to the polling date for various reasons.

== Constituency profile ==
The Houghton and Sunderland South constituency is located in Tyne and Wear and was historically in County Durham. It covers the southwestern suburbs of the city of Sunderland (South Hylton, Pennywell, Farringdon and New Silksworth) and the towns of Houghton-le-Spring and Hetton-le-Hole to the city's southwest. The Sunderland suburbs were developed after World War II as social housing estates to house industrial workers and have high levels of deprivation; most of this area falls within the top 10% most-deprived parts of England. Houghton-le-Spring and Hetton-le-Hole were traditionally coal mining towns and also have low levels of wealth. The average house price across the constituency is less than half the national average.

Residents of the constituency generally have low levels of education and are more religious than the rest of the country. Household income is low and a high proportion of residents work in the construction and manufacturing industries. White people made up 97% of the population at the 2021 census. At the local council, most of the constituency is represented by the Labour Party, although some Conservative and Liberal Democrat councillors were elected in the Sunderland suburbs. Voters in the constituency strongly supported leaving the European Union in the 2016 referendum; an estimated 64% voted in favour of Brexit compared to the nationwide figure of 52%.

== Boundaries ==
=== 2010–2024 ===
The City of Sunderland wards of Copt Hill, Doxford, Hetton, Houghton, St Chad's, Sandhill, Shiney Row, and Silksworth.

Map of boundaries 2010–2024

Houghton and Sunderland South was created for the 2010 general election when the Boundary Commission reduced the number of seats in Tyne and Wear from 13 to 12, with the constituencies in the City of Sunderland, in particular, being reorganised. The constituency was formed from the majority of the former Houghton and Washington East seat (Copt Hill, Doxford, Hetton, Houghton and Shiney Row wards) and parts of the former Sunderland South seat (St Chad's, Sandhill and Silksworth wards).

=== Current ===
Further to the 2023 review of Westminster constituencies, which came into effect for the 2024 general election, the constituency was expanded to bring the electorate within the permitted range, by adding the City of Sunderland ward of St Anne's (as it existed on 1 December 2020), transferred from the abolished Washington and Sunderland West.

Following a local government boundary review, which came into effect in May 2026, the seat now comprises the following wards or part wards of the City of Sunderland:

- Doxford Park; Farringdon & Silksworth; Grindon & Thorney Close (nearly all); Herrington & Newbottle; Hetton; Houghton North; Houghton South & Hetton Downs; Pennywell & South Hylton (most); Penshaw & Shiney Row; Ryhope (small part); Tunstall & Humbledon (small part).

== Members of Parliament ==
Election	Member	Party
2010	Bridget Phillipson	Labour

== Elections ==
Vote share in Houghton and Sunderland South elections 2010–2024

=== Elections in the 2020s ===
General election 2024: Houghton and Sunderland South
Party	Candidate	Votes	%	±%
Labour	Bridget Phillipson	18,837	47.1	+6.7
Reform	Sam Woods-Brass	11,668	29.1	+13.4
Conservative	Chris Burnicle	5,514	13.8	−19.1
Liberal Democrats	Paul Edgeworth	2,290	5.7	−0.2
Green	Richard Bradley	1,723	4.3	+1.6
Majority		7,168	18.0	+10.2
Turnout		40,032	51.0	−6.0
Labour hold		Swing		

=== Elections in the 2010s ===
General election 2019: Houghton and Sunderland South
Party	Candidate	Votes	%	±%
Labour	Bridget Phillipson	16,210	40.7	−18.8
Conservative	Christopher Howarth	13,095	32.9	+3.2
Brexit Party	Kevin Yuill	6,165	15.5	New
Liberal Democrats	Paul Edgeworth	2,319	5.8	+3.6
Green	Richard Bradley	1,125	2.8	+1.0
UKIP	Richard Elvin	897	2.3	−3.4
Majority		3,115	7.8	−22.0
Turnout		39,811	57.8	−3.1
Labour hold		Swing	−11.0	

General election 2017: Houghton and Sunderland South
Party	Candidate	Votes	%	±%
Labour	Bridget Phillipson	24,665	59.5	+4.4
Conservative	Paul Howell	12,324	29.7	+11.2
UKIP	Michael Joyce	2,379	5.7	−15.8
Liberal Democrats	Paul Edgeworth	908	2.2	+0.1
Green	Richard Bradley	725	1.8	−1.0
Independent	Michael Watson	479	1.2	New
Majority		12,341	29.8	−3.8
Turnout		41,480	60.9	+4.6
Labour hold		Swing	−3.4	

General election 2015: Houghton and Sunderland South
Party	Candidate	Votes	%	±%
Labour	Bridget Phillipson	21,218	55.1	+4.8
UKIP	Richard Elvin	8,280	21.5	+18.8
Conservative	Stewart Hay	7,105	18.5	−2.9
Green	Alan Robinson	1,095	2.8	New
Liberal Democrats	Jim Murray	791	2.1	−11.8
Majority		12,938	33.6	+4.7
Turnout		38,489	56.3	+1.0
Labour hold		Swing	−7.0	

General election 2010: Houghton and Sunderland South
Party	Candidate	Votes	%	±%
Labour	Bridget Phillipson	19,137	50.3	
Conservative	Robert Oliver	8,147	21.4	
Liberal Democrats	Christopher Boyle	5,292	13.9	
Independent	Colin Wakefield	2,462	6.5	
BNP	Karen Allen	1,961	5.2	
UKIP	Richard Elvin	1,022	2.7	
Majority		10,990	28.9	
Turnout		38,021	55.3	
Labour win (new seat)				

== See also ==
- List of parliamentary constituencies in Tyne and Wear
- History of parliamentary constituencies and boundaries in Tyne and Wear
- List of parliamentary constituencies in North East England (region)
