= Cramlington and Killingworth =

UK Parliament constituency (since 2024)

Coordinates: 55.07°N 1.56°W

- County constituency for the House of Commons
- Interactive map of boundaries since 2024
- Location in North East England
- County: Northumberland; Tyne and Wear
- Electorate: 73,295 (March 2020)
- Major settlements: Cramlington; Killingworth; Shiremoor

Current constituency
- Created: 2024
- Member of Parliament: Emma Foody (Labour Co-op)
- Seats: One
- Created from: Blyth Valley (major part); North Tyneside; Tynemouth (part); Newcastle upon Tyne North (minor part)

Cramlington and Killingworth is a constituency of the House of Commons in the UK Parliament. Further to the completion of the 2023 review of Westminster constituencies, it was first contested at the 2024 general election and is currently held by Emma Foody, a Labour Co-op MP.

== Constituency profile ==
The Cramlington and Killingworth constituency is located in North East England. It covers the towns and villages to the north of Newcastle-upon-Tyne and stretches over parts of the counties of Northumberland and Tyne and Wear. The largest town in the constituency is Cramlington with a population of around 29,000. Other settlements in the constituency include the town of Killingworth and the villages of Wideopen, Dudley, Shiremoor and Seaton Delaval. Both Cramlington and Killingworth are new towns developed in the 1960s to accommodate the Newcastle overspill.

Residents of the constituency have average levels of education and income and are more likely to work in professional occupations compared to the rest of North East England. At the 2021 census, White people made up 96% of the population. At the local council level, most of Cramlington is represented by Conservatives, whilst Shiremoor and Killingworth elected Labour Party councillors. An estimated 58% of voters in the constituency supported leaving the European Union in the 2016 referendum, higher than the national figure of 52%.

== Boundaries ==
The constituency crosses the boundary of the ceremonial counties of Northumberland and Tyne and Wear. Further to the 2023 boundary review, the constituency was defined as composing the following from the 2024 general election (as they existed on 1 December 2020):

- The City of Newcastle upon Tyne ward of Castle (polling districts F01, F02 and F03).
- The Metropolitan Borough of North Tyneside wards of: Camperdown; Killingworth; Valley; Weetslade^{1}.
- The County of Northumberland electoral divisions of: Cramlington East; Cramlington Eastfield; Cramlington North; Cramlington South East; Cramlington Village; Cramlington West; Hartley; Holywell; Seghill with Seaton Delaval.

The seat includes the following areas:

- The majority of the abolished constituency of Blyth Valley, including Cramlington and Seaton Delaval, but excluding the town of Blyth itself.
- The Borough of North Tyneside communities of Camperdown, Killingworth, Dudley and Wideopen, previously part of the abolished constituency of North Tyneside.
- The North Tyneside villages of Shiremoor and Backworth, transferred from Tynemouth.
- The village of Dinnington in the City of Newcastle upon Tyne, transferred from Newcastle upon Tyne North.

Further to local government boundary reviews in all three local authorities, the constituency now comprises the following:

- Parts of the City of Newcastle upon Tyne wards of Castle; Kingston Park & Dinnington.
- The Metropolitan Borough of North Tyneside wards or part wards of: Backworth & Holystone; Battle Hill (very small part); Camperdown (most); Forest Hill (small part); Killingworth; Shiremoor; Weetslade.
- The County of Northumberland electoral divisions of: Cramlington East and Double Row; Cramlington Eastfield; Cramlington North; Cramlington North West; Cramlington South East; Cramlington South West; Cramlington Village; Hartley; Holywell; Seghill with Seaton Delaval.

== Members of Parliament ==
Blyth Valley and North Tyneside prior to 2024

Election	Member	Party
2024	Emma Foody	Labour Co-op

== Elections ==
=== Elections in the 2020s ===
General election 2024: Cramlington and Killingworth
Party	Candidate	Votes	%	±%
Labour Co-op	Emma Foody	22,274	49.1	+4.7
Reform	Gordon Fletcher	9,454	20.8	+12.8
Conservative	Ian Levy	8,592	18.9	−21.0
Green	Ian Jones	2,144	4.7	+2.2
Liberal Democrats	Thom Campion	1,898	4.2	−1.0
Independent	Scott Lee	573	1.3	N/A
Independent	Dawn Furness	322	0.7	N/A
SDP	Mathew Wilkinson	137	0.3	N/A
Majority		12,820	28.3	+23.8
Turnout		45,394	59.6	−6.0
Labour win (new seat)				

=== Elections in the 2010s ===
2019 notional result
Party	Vote	%
Labour	21,331	44.4
Conservative	19,174	39.9
Brexit	3,855	8.0
Liberal Democrats	2,520	5.2
Green	1,192	2.5
Turnout	48,072	65.6
Electorate	73,295	

== See also ==
- Parliamentary constituencies in Northumberland
- Parliamentary constituencies in Tyne and Wear
- Parliamentary constituencies in North East England
