= Gateshead East =

Parliamentary constituency in the United Kingdom, 1950–1997

- Former borough constituency for the House of Commons
- Boundary of Gateshead East in Tyne and Wear, boundaries 1983–1997
- County: County Durham until 1974, then Tyne and Wear

1950–1997
- Seats: One
- Created from: Gateshead
- Replaced by: Gateshead East & Washington West, Tyne Bridge and Jarrow

Gateshead East was a parliamentary constituency represented in the House of Commons of the Parliament of the United Kingdom from 1950 to 1997. It elected one Member of Parliament (MP) by the first past the post system of election.

== History ==
Gateshead East, as could be inferred from the name, formed the eastern part of the Borough of Gateshead, now in Tyne and Wear. The constituency was created by the Representation of the People Act 1948 for the 1950 general election when the existing Gateshead seat was split in two. It was abolished for the 1997 general election, when it was largely replaced by the new constituency of Gateshead East and Washington West, with smaller areas going to Tyne Bridge and Jarrow.

It returned Labour MPs for the entire period of its existence.

== Boundaries ==
=== 1950–1955 ===
- The County Borough of Gateshead wards of East, East Central, North East, South, and South Central.

=== 1955–1964 ===
- The County Borough of Gateshead wards of East, South, and South Central; and
- the Urban District of Felling.

The East Central and North East wards were transferred to Gateshead West. Felling transferred from Jarrow.

=== 1964–1983 ===
- The County Borough of Gateshead wards of Claxton, Enfield, Low Fell, and Wrekenton; and
- the Urban District of Felling.

Minor changes to reflect redistribution of local authority wards.

=== 1983–1997 ===
- The Metropolitan Borough of Gateshead wards of Chowdene, Deckham, Felling, High Fell, Leam, Low Fell, Pelaw and Heworth, Saltwell, and Wrekendyke.

A small part included in the new constituency of Tyne Bridge. Gained parts of the abolished constituency of Gateshead West.

== Members of Parliament ==
Election	Member	Party
1950	Arthur Moody	Labour
1964	Bernard Conlan	Labour
1987	Joyce Quin	Labour
1997	constituency abolished: see Gateshead East & Washington West, Tyne Bridge and Jarrow	

== Elections ==
=== Elections in the 1950s ===
General election 1950: Gateshead East
Party	Candidate	Votes	%	±%
Labour	Arthur Moody	15,249	45.14	
National Liberal	Douglas Clift	13,530	40.05	
Independent Labour	Konni Zilliacus	5,001	14.80	
Majority		1,719	5.09	
Turnout		33,780	85.81	
Labour win (new seat)				

General election 1951: Gateshead East
Party	Candidate	Votes	%	±%
Labour	Arthur Moody	19,525	57.65	
National Liberal	Douglas Clift	14,344	42.35	
Majority		5,181	15.30	
Turnout		33,869	85.67	
Labour hold		Swing		

General election 1955: Gateshead East
Party	Candidate	Votes	%	±%
Labour	Arthur Moody	21,653	56.45	
Conservative	George Glover	16,706	43.55	
Majority		4,947	12.90	
Turnout		38,359	78.78	
Labour hold		Swing		

General election 1959: Gateshead East
Party	Candidate	Votes	%	±%
Labour	Arthur Moody	25,319	58.92	
Conservative	George Glover	17,654	41.08	
Majority		7,665	17.84	
Turnout		42,973	81.60	
Labour hold		Swing		

=== Elections in the 1960s ===
General election 1964: Gateshead East
Party	Candidate	Votes	%	±%
Labour	Bernard Conlan	26,633	64.51	
Conservative	Olive Sinclair	14,654	35.49	
Majority		11,979	29.02	
Turnout		41,287	79.85	
Labour hold		Swing		

General election 1966: Gateshead East
Party	Candidate	Votes	%	±%
Labour	Bernard Conlan	27,628	69.57	
Conservative	James HE Mendl	12,084	30.43	
Majority		15,544	39.14	
Turnout		39,712	75.73	
Labour hold		Swing		

=== Elections in the 1970s ===
General election 1970: Gateshead East
Party	Candidate	Votes	%	±%
Labour	Bernard Conlan	28,524	64.81	
Conservative	Peter R Wood	15,489	35.19	
Majority		13,035	29.62	
Turnout		44,013	70.73	
Labour hold		Swing		

General election February 1974: Gateshead East
Party	Candidate	Votes	%	±%
Labour	Bernard Conlan	27,269	55.16	
Conservative	Richard Ryder	11,970	24.21	
Liberal	Kenneth Aubrey Buckingham	10,196	20.63	New
Majority		15,299	30.95	
Turnout		49,435	78.62	
Labour hold		Swing		

General election October 1974: Gateshead East
Party	Candidate	Votes	%	±%
Labour	Bernard Conlan	27,620	61.87	
Conservative	Richard Ryder	10,021	22.45	
Liberal	Kenneth Aubrey Buckingham	6,998	15.68	
Majority		17,599	39.42	
Turnout		44,639	70.30	
Labour hold		Swing		

General election 1979: Gateshead East
Party	Candidate	Votes	%	±%
Labour	Bernard Conlan	28,776	61.15	
Conservative	Frank Rogers	14,078	29.92	
Liberal	C Batey	4,201	8.93	
Majority		14,698	31.23	
Turnout		47,055	75.32	
Labour hold		Swing		

=== Elections in the 1980s ===
General election 1983: Gateshead East
Party	Candidate	Votes	%	±%
Labour	Bernard Conlan	22,981	48.32	
Conservative	Frank Rogers	12,659	26.62	
SDP	Paul Nunn	11,920	25.06	
Majority		10,322	21.70	
Turnout		47,560	69.57	
Labour hold		Swing		

General election 1987: Gateshead East
Party	Candidate	Votes	%	±%
Labour	Joyce Quin	28,895	59.22	
Conservative	Francis Rogers	11,667	23.91	
SDP	Noel Rippeth	8,231	16.87	
Majority		17,228	35.31	
Turnout		48,793	71.80	
Labour hold		Swing		

=== Elections in the 1990s ===
General election 1992: Gateshead East
Party	Candidate	Votes	%	±%
Labour	Joyce Quin	30,100	63.5	+4.3
Conservative	Martin Callanan	11,570	24.4	+0.5
Liberal Democrats	Ron W.A.L. Beadle	5,720	12.1	−4.8
Majority		18,530	39.1	+3.8
Turnout		47,390	73.6	+1.8
Labour hold		Swing		

== See also ==
- History of parliamentary constituencies and boundaries in Tyne and Wear
- History of parliamentary constituencies and boundaries in Durham
