= Bernard Conlan =

British politician

Bernard Conlan (24 October 1923 – 12 December 2013) was a British Labour Party politician.

Conlan was educated in Manchester and became an engineer, and an official of the Amalgamated Engineering Union from 1942. He served as a councillor on Manchester City Council from 1954.

Conlan contested High Peak in 1959. He was Member of Parliament for Gateshead East from 1964 until he retired in 1987. His successor was Joyce Quin.

Conlan died 12 December 2013 aged 90.

Parliament of the United Kingdom
Preceded by Arthur Moody	Member of Parliament for Gateshead East; 1964–1987	Succeeded by Joyce Quin
