= Joyce Quin =

British politician (born 1944)

The Right Honourable The Baroness Quin PC
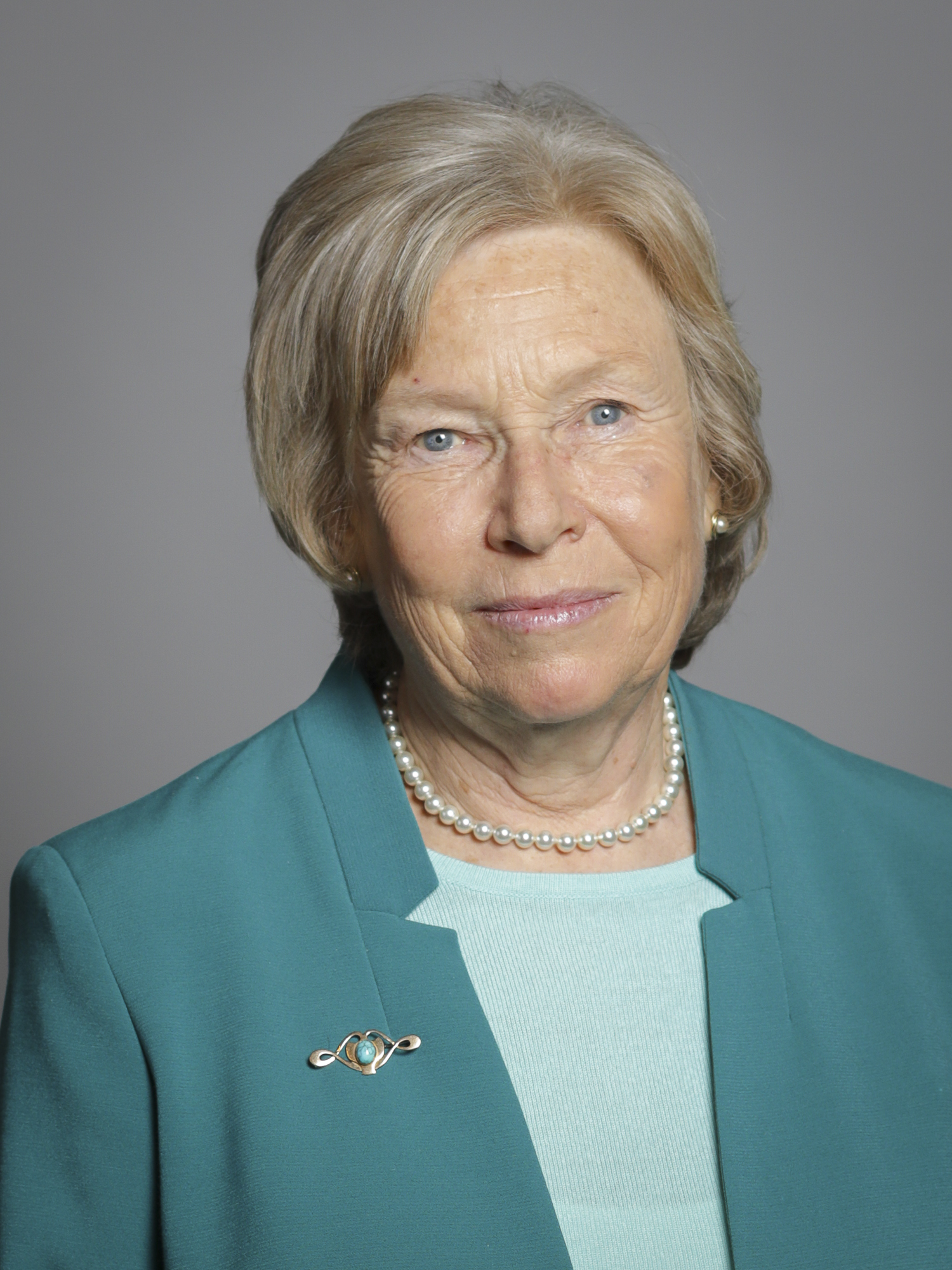
- Official portrait, 2019

Minister of State for Europe
- In office 28 July 1998 – 28 July 1999
- Prime Minister: Tony Blair
- Preceded by: Doug Henderson
- Succeeded by: Geoff Hoon (Minister)

Minister of State for Prisons
- In office 2 May 1997 – 28 July 1998
- Prime Minister: Tony Blair
- Preceded by: Ann Widdecombe
- Succeeded by: The Lord Williams of Mostyn

Minister of State for Agriculture, Fisheries and Food
- In office 29 July 1999 – 7 June 2001
- Prime Minister: Tony Blair
- Preceded by: Bernard Donoughue
- Succeeded by: MAFF incorporated with Department of the Environment into DEFRA, established 2001.

Member of Parliament for Gateshead East and Washington West Gateshead East (1987–1997)
- In office 12 June 1987 – 11 April 2005
- Preceded by: Bernard Conlan
- Succeeded by: Sharon Hodgson

Member of the European Parliament for Tyne and Wear Tyne South and Wear (1979–1984)
- In office 10 June 1979 – 18 June 1989
- Preceded by: Constituency established
- Succeeded by: Alan Donnelly

Member of the House of Lords
- Lord Temporal
- Life peerage 30 May 2006 – 19 December 2024

Personal details
- Born: Joyce Gwendolen Quin; 26 November 1944 (age 81)
- Party: Labour
- Spouse: Francis Guy MacMullen
- Education: Newcastle University; London School of Economics

Joyce Gwendolen Quin, Baroness Quin (born 26 November 1944), is a British Labour Party politician. She was a member of the European Parliament from 1979 to 1989, and served as the member of Parliament (MP) for Gateshead East and Washington West and for its predecessor Gateshead East from 1987 to 2005. Quin was appointed a life peer in 2006 and sat in the House of Lords until her retirement in 2024.

== Early life and career ==
Quin was educated at Whitley Bay Grammar School and Newcastle University, where she gained first-class honours in French and came top in her year. She subsequently gained an Master of Science (MSc) degree in international relations at the London School of Economics. She worked as a French language lecturer and tutor at the University of Bath and Durham University. Quin is the great-niece of Labour Party politician Joshua Ritson (1874–1955).

She served as a member of the European Parliament for Tyne South and Wear and Tyne and Wear successively from 1979 to 1989. During her time as an MEP she served as Labour spokesperson on Fisheries from 1979 to 1984. She was a member of the Agriculture, Women's Rights, Regional and Economic Affairs Committee. In 1979, she tabled the resolution to set up a Register of Members' Interests which was eventually accepted by the European Parliament.

== Member of Parliament ==
Quin entered the House of Commons in the 1987 election as Member of Parliament for Gateshead East. In Opposition (1987–1997) she served on the Labour front bench as a Shadow Minister for Consumer Affairs, Trade Policy, Regional Policy and Employment (dealing with the EU Social Chapter). From 1994 to 1997 she served as Shadow Europe Minister and was Deputy to Shadow Foreign Secretary Robin Cook.

After boundary changes for the 1997 general election, she represented the new Gateshead East and Washington West constituency from 1997 until she stepped down at the 2005 general election and was replaced by Sharon Hodgson. Quin served as prisons minister, Minister for Europe, and as Minister of State for Agriculture (and deputy to Cabinet Minister, Nick Brown). She asked to retire as a minister in 2001 to concentrate on her constituency interests. She had intended to stand for membership of a North East Regional Assembly on her retirement from Westminster, but the proposed body was rejected by a margin of 4–1 in a referendum in November 2004. In Parliament as a backbencher Quin was the first woman to chair the Northern Group of Labour MPs and Chaired the All-Party Group for France (Franco-British Parliamentary Group). She successfully lobbied Chancellor Gordon Brown to bring in the nationwide concessionary bus travel scheme for pensioners

== Life peer ==
In April 2006, it was announced that Quin had been nominated for a life peerage by the Labour Party. On 30 May, she was created Baroness Quin, of Gateshead in the County of Tyne and Wear. Quin was appointed a shadow Department for Environment, Food and Rural Affairs minister by Harriet Harman in May 2010, and was retained in that role by Ed Miliband after his election as Leader of the Labour Party. She stood down from this position in July 2011.

In November 2007, Baroness Quin was appointed Chair of the Franco-British Council (British Section).

She was interviewed in 2014 as part of The History of Parliament's oral history project.

Quin retired from the House of Lords on 19 December 2024, having made her valedictory speech on 11 December

== Other Roles and Publications ==
Quin has volunteered as a Newcastle City Tourist Guide since 1976. She is President of the Northumbrian Pipers' Society (since 2009) and President of the Northumberland National Park Foundation (since 2016). She served as Chair of the Strategic Board of Tyne and Wear Museums between 2017 and 2023 (museums now called North East Museums).

In 2010 Quin authored a book titled "The British Constitution, Continuity and Change - An Inside View: Authoritative Insight into How Modern Britain Works" published by Northern Writers ISBN 9780955386985

Quin co-authored "Angels of the North - Notable Women of the North-East" with Moira Kilkenny, published 2018, reprinted 2019 by Tyne Bridge Publishing ISBN 978-0951048863. Together they published the second volume "Angels of the North - More Notable Women of the North-East" in 2024 with Tyne Bridge Publishing ISBN 9781739223335.

== European Movement ==
Quin served as vice-president of the European Movement UK from 2005 to 2024. Since 2024 she contributes through her role as a Patron.

== Honours ==
Honorary Fellow, Sunderland Polytechnic (now University of Sunderland) 1986.

Honorary Fellowship of St. Mary's College, Durham University, 1994.

Freeman of the Borough of Gateshead, 2006.

Awarded "Officier de la Légion d'Honneur" by the French Government, 2010.

Honorary Doctorate of Civil Laws, University of Newcastle upon Tyne, 2023.

European Parliament
| New constituency | Member of the European Parliament for Tyne South and Wear; 1979–1984 | Constituency abolished |
| New constituency | Member of the European Parliament for Tyne and Wear; 1984–1989 | Succeeded by Alan Donnelly |
Parliament of the United Kingdom
| Preceded by Bernard Conlan | Member of Parliament for Gateshead East; 1987–1997 | Constituency abolished |
| New constituency | Member of Parliament for Gateshead East and Washington West; 1997–2005 | Succeeded by Sharon Hodgson |
Political offices
| Preceded by Ann Widdecombe | Minister of State for Home Affairs; 1997–1998 | Succeeded by The Lord Williams of Mostyn |
| Preceded by Doug Henderson | Minister of State for Europe; 1998–1999 | Succeeded by Geoff Hoon |
