= Gateshead East and Washington West =

UK Parliament constituency (1997–2010)

Coordinates: 54.937°N 1.555°W

- Former borough constituency for the House of Commons
- Boundary of Gateshead East and Washington West in Tyne and Wear for the 2005 general election

- Location of Tyne and Wear within England
- County: Tyne and Wear

1997–2010
- Seats: One
- Replaced by: Gateshead, Jarrow, Washington and Sunderland West

Gateshead East and Washington West was a parliamentary constituency represented in the House of Commons of the Parliament of the United Kingdom from 1997 to 2010. It elected one Member of Parliament (MP) by the first past the post electoral system.

== History ==
The constituency was created for the 1997 general election, primarily from the abolished Gateshead East seat, with the addition of two Washington wards from Houghton and Washington.

It was abolished for the 2010 general election when the Boundary Commission reduced the number of seats in Tyne and Wear from 13 to 12, with the constituencies in the City of Sunderland, in particular, being reorganised. The majority of the seat was included in the re-established constituency of Gateshead, while the two Washington wards were included in the new seat of Washington and Sunderland West and the Pelaw and Heworth ward was transferred to Jarrow.

== Boundaries ==
1997–2010

- The Metropolitan Borough of Gateshead wards of Chowdene, Felling, High Fell, Leam, Low Fell, and Pelaw and Heworth; and
- the City of Sunderland wards of Washington South and Washington West.

== Members of Parliament ==
Election	Member	Party
1997	Joyce Quin	Labour
2005	Sharon Hodgson	Labour
2010	Constituency abolished: see Gateshead, Jarrow and Washington and Sunderland West	

== Election results ==
=== Elections of the 2000s ===
General election 2005: Gateshead East and Washington West
Party	Candidate	Votes	%	±%
Labour	Sharon Hodgson	20,997	60.6	−7.5
Liberal Democrats	Frank Hindle	7,590	21.9	+7.0
Conservative	Lee Martin	4,812	13.9	−0.9
UKIP	Jim Batty	1,269	3.7	+1.5
Majority		13,407	38.7	−14.5
Turnout		34,668	56.4	+3.9
Labour hold		Swing	−7.3	

General election 2001: Gateshead East and Washington West
Party	Candidate	Votes	%	±%
Labour	Joyce Quin	22,903	68.1	−3.9
Liberal Democrats	Ron Beadle	4,999	14.9	+4.2
Conservative	Elizabeth Campbell	4,970	14.8	+0.6
UKIP	Martin Rouse	743	2.2	New
Majority		17,904	53.2	−4.7
Turnout		33,615	52.5	−14.7
Labour hold		Swing		

=== Elections of the 1990s ===
General election 1997: Gateshead East and Washington West
Party	Candidate	Votes	%	±%
Labour	Joyce Quin	31,047	72.1	
Conservative	Jacqui M. Burns	6,097	14.2	
Liberal Democrats	Alan D. Ord	4,622	10.7	
Referendum	Michael Daley	1,315	3.1	
Majority		24,950	57.9	
Turnout		43,081	67.2	
Labour win (new seat)				

== See also ==
- History of parliamentary constituencies and boundaries in Tyne and Wear
