= Blaydon and Consett =

UK Parliament constituency (since 2024)

Coordinates: 54.9°N 1.78°W

- County constituency for the House of Commons
- Interactive map of boundaries since 2024
- Location within North East England
- County: County Durham/Tyne and Wear
- Electorate: 70,847 (2024)
- Major settlements: Consett, Blaydon, Ryton, Benfieldside

Current constituency
- Created: 2024
- Member of Parliament: Liz Twist (Labour)
- Seats: One
- Created from: Blaydon; North West Durham

Blaydon and Consett is a constituency of the House of Commons in the UK Parliament. Created as a result of the 2023 review of Westminster constituencies, it was first contested at the 2024 general election and is currently held by Liz Twist of the Labour Party, who previously represented the abolished Blaydon constituency from 2017 to 2024.

== Constituency profile ==
The Blaydon and Consett constituency is located in North East England and covers rural areas to the south-west of Newcastle-upon-Tyne. It stretches over parts of Tyne and Wear (specifically the Metropolitan Borough of Gateshead) and County Durham. Settlements in the constituency include the towns of Blaydon and Consett, the large villages of Ryton and Crawcrook, and other smaller villages.

The constituency sits at the edge of the Pennines and is predominantly upland and rural. The towns of Blaydon and Consett have an industrial heritage, particularly in coal mining and steelmaking. Compared to national averages, residents are generally more religious and have similar levels of wealth, education and professional employment. White people make up 98% of the population.

The area around Blaydon had its most recent local council election in 2024 and all seats in the area were won by Labour Party candidates. The Consett area had its most recent local council election in 2025 and elected predominantly Reform UK councillors. In the 2016 referendum on European Union membership, an estimated 56% of voters in the constituency supported Brexit, slightly higher than the national figure of 52%.

== Boundaries ==
The constituency crosses the boundary of the ceremonial counties of Durham and Tyne and Wear. Further to the 2023 boundary review, the constituency was defined as composing the following from the 2024 general election (as they existed on 1 December 2020):

- The County of Durham electoral divisions of: Benfieldside; Burnopfield and Dipton; Consett North; Consett South; Delves Lane; Leadgate and Medomsley.
- The Metropolitan Borough of Gateshead wards of: Blaydon; Chopwell and Rowlands Gill; Crawcrook and Greenside; Ryton, Crookhill and Stella; Winlaton and High Spen.

Further to local government boundary reviews in County Durham and the Borough of Gateshead which came into effect in May 2025 and May 2026 respectively, the constituency now comprises the following:

- The County of Durham electoral divisions of: Benfieldside; Consett North; Consett South (most); Delves Lane; Derwent and Pont Valley.
- The Metropolitan Borough of Gateshead wards of: Blaydon; Chopwell and Rowlands Gill; Crawcrook and Greenside; Ryton, Crookhill and Stella; Winlaton and High Spen.

The seat comprises approximately half the electorate of each of the abolished constituencies of Blaydon and North West Durham and includes the following communities:

- Blaydon, Rowlands Gill, and Ryton from the Borough of Gateshead in Tyne and Wear
- Consett, Leadgate, and Burnopfield from County Durham

== Members of Parliament ==
Blaydon and North West Durham prior to 2024

Election	Member	Party
2024	Liz Twist	Labour

== Elections ==
=== Elections in the 2020s ===
General election 2024: Blaydon and Consett
Party	Candidate	Votes	%	±%
Labour	Liz Twist	21,160	50.1	+6.1
Reform	David Ayre	10,007	23.7	+14.0
Conservative	Angela Sterling	6,052	14.3	−20.6
Green	Richard Simpson	2,589	6.1	+3.1
Liberal Democrats	Vicky Anderson	2,273	5.4	+0.8
SDP	Paul Topping	135	0.3	N/A
Majority		11,153	26.4	+17.3
Turnout		42,216	59.9	−7.0
Labour hold		Swing		

=== Elections in the 2010s ===
2019 notional result
Party	Vote	%
Labour	20,656	44.0
Conservative	16,371	34.9
Brexit	4,555	9.7
Liberal Democrats	2,146	4.6
Green	1,421	3.0
Others	1,201	2.6
Liberal	615	1.3
Turnout	46,965	66.9
Electorate	76,163	

== See also ==
- Parliamentary constituencies in County Durham
- List of parliamentary constituencies in Tyne and Wear
- List of parliamentary constituencies in North East England (region)
