= Jarrow and Gateshead East =

UK Parliament constituency (since 2024)

Coordinates: 54.96°N 1.50°W

- Borough constituency for the House of Commons
- Interactive map of boundaries since 2024
- Location within North East England
- County: Tyne and Wear
- Electorate: 70,272 (2024)
- Major settlements: Jarrow, Hebburn, Pelaw

Current constituency
- Created: 2024
- Member of Parliament: Kate Osborne (Labour)
- Seats: One
- Created from: Jarrow; Gateshead (minor part)

Jarrow and Gateshead East is a constituency of the House of Commons in the UK Parliament. Created as a result of the 2023 review of Westminster constituencies, it was first contested at the 2024 general election and is currently held by Kate Osborne of the Labour Party, who previously held the abolished constituency of Jarrow from 2019 to 2024.

== Constituency profile ==
The Jarrow and Gateshead East constituency is located in Tyne and Wear and covers parts of the metropolitan boroughs of Gateshead and South Tyneside. It includes the towns of Jarrow, Hebburn and Felling, the villages of West Boldon and Boldon Colliery and the residential areas of Pelaw and Wardley. The constituency forms part of the Tyneside contiguous urban area. Jarrow and Hebburn have an industrial heritage, particularly in shipbuilding and metalworking. Felling and the Boldon villages have a history of coal mining. Most of the constituency has high levels of deprivation, particularly Jarrow and Felling which fall within the top 10% most-deprived areas in England. Hebburn is generally wealthier. The average house price in the constituency is lower than the rest of North East England and less than half the national average.

Residents of Jarrow and Gateshead East generally have low levels of education, income and professional employment. A high proportion of residents work in the manufacturing and transport industries. White people made up 96% of the population at the 2021 census. Most of the constituency is represented by Labour Party councillors with some Liberal Democrats elected in Pelaw and independents elected in Jarrow. Voters in the constituency strongly supported leaving the European Union in the 2016 referendum; an estimated 63% voted in favour of Brexit compared to a nationwide figure of 52%.

== Boundaries ==
Further to the 2023 boundary review, the constituency was defined as composing the following from the 2024 general election (as they existed on 1 December 2020):

- The Metropolitan Borough of Gateshead wards of: Felling; Pelaw & Heworth^{1}; Wardley & Leam Lane; and Windy Nook & Whitehills.
- The Metropolitan Borough of South Tyneside wards of: Bede; Boldon Colliery; Fellgate & Hedworth; Hebburn North; Hebburn South; Monkton; and Primrose.

^{1} Following a local government boundary review which became effective in May 2026, this ward was renamed Pelaw, Heworth & Bill Quay.

The seat was formed from the existing Jarrow constituency, excluding the Cleadon & East Boldon ward, with the addition of the Felling, and Windy Nook & Whitehills wards from Gateshead.

== Members of Parliament ==
Jarrow prior to 2024

Election	Member	Party
2024	Kate Osborne	Labour

== Elections ==
=== Elections in the 2020s ===
General election 2024: Jarrow and Gateshead East
Party	Candidate	Votes	%	±%
Labour	Kate Osborne	18,856	51.3	+2.1
Reform	Lynda Alexandra	9,892	26.9	+17.4
Conservative	Jack Gebhard	3,354	9.1	−14.6
Green	Nic Cook	2,384	6.5	+4.0
Liberal Democrats	James Rickelton	1,740	4.7	−1.8
ADF	Mark Conway	502	1.4	N/A
Majority		8,946	24.4	−1.1
Turnout		36,728	52.3	−4.7
Labour hold		Swing		

=== Elections in the 2010s ===
2019 notional result
Party	Vote	%
Labour	19,917	49.2
Conservative	9,600	23.7
Brexit	3,843	9.5
Others	3,488	8.6
Liberal Democrats	2,649	6.5
Green	1,009	2.5
Turnout	40,506	57.0
Electorate	71,106	

== See also ==
- List of parliamentary constituencies in Tyne and Wear
- List of parliamentary constituencies in North East England (region)
