= Sharon Hodgson =

British politician (born 1966)

Sharon Hodgson MP
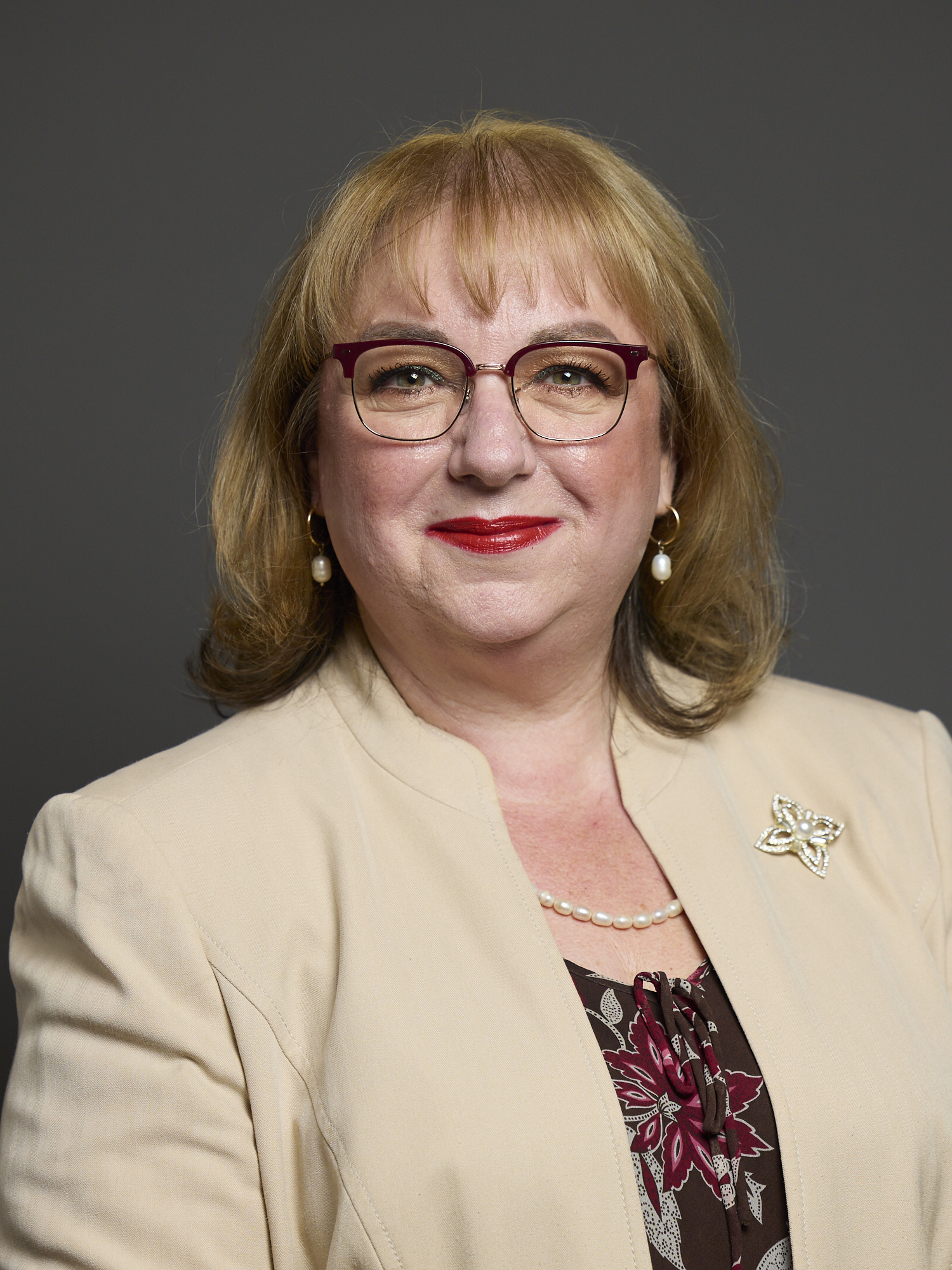
- Official portrait, 2024

Parliamentary Under-Secretary of State for Public Health and Prevention
- In office 3 March 2026 – 22 July 2026
- Prime Minister: Keir Starmer
- Preceded by: Ashley Dalton
- Succeeded by: Diana Johnson

Member of Parliament
- Incumbent
- Assumed office 5 May 2005
- Preceded by: Joyce Quin
- Constituency: Gateshead East and Washington West (2005–2010); Washington and Sunderland West (2010–2024); Washington and Gateshead South (2024–present)
- Majority: 6,913 (18.6%)

Chair of the Finance Committee
- In office 7 March 2023 – 30 May 2024
- Preceded by: Nick Brown
- Succeeded by: Steve Barclay

Assistant Government Whip
- In office 10 June 2009 – 6 May 2010
- Prime Minister: Gordon Brown
Shadow portfolios
2021–2023	PPS to the Opposition Leader
2020–2021	Veterans
2016–2020	Public Health
2015–2016	Children and Families
2013–2015	Women and Equalities
2010–2013	Children and Families
2010–2010	Whip

Personal details
- Born: 1 April 1966 (age 60) Gateshead, County Durham, England
- Party: Labour
- Education: Newcastle College
- Website: www.sharonhodgson.org

Sharon Hodgson (born 1 April 1966) is a British politician who has been the Member of Parliament (MP) for Washington and Gateshead South since 2024, and previously for Washington and Sunderland West and Gateshead East and Washington West from 2005. A member of the Labour Party, she served as Parliamentary Under-Secretary of State for Public Health and Prevention in 2026.

== Early life ==
Hodgson was born in Gateshead on 1 April 1966 to a Jewish father and non-Jewish mother and was educated locally at Greenwell Junior High School and Heathfield Senior High School, where she obtained eight O-levels. After leaving school, she worked as an accounts clerk in the Team Valley, then attended Newcastle College and the Trades Union Congress Academy in London.

Hodgson later worked for Northern Rock in Gosforth, and then as a payroll and accounting clerk for local companies. After being a full-time mother for a few years in the mid-1990s, and volunteering for the Labour Party in Stockton-on-Tees during the 1997 general election campaign, she became a party organiser in 1999.

In 2000, she became the local Party organiser for two years in the Mitcham and Morden constituency, helping the sitting Labour MP Siobhain McDonagh to be re-elected at the 2001 general election. Before her election to Parliament, Hodgson worked as Labour Link Officer for UNISON.

She was elected for two years as the women's officer within the Tyne Bridge Constituency Labour Party (CLP) in 1998. In 2002, she was elected as the secretary of the Mitcham and Morden CLP in the London Borough of Merton.

== Parliamentary career ==
In 2004, Hodgson was chosen as the official Labour candidate for Gateshead East and Washington West at the 2005 general election. Her selection followed the retirement of the sitting Labour MP Joyce Quin, and came about as a result of an all-woman shortlist. Hodgson held the seat with a majority of 13,407 votes, and gave her maiden speech in the House of Commons on 25 May 2005.

Following boundary changes, the constituency of Gateshead East and Washington West was abolished and replaced by two new seats, Gateshead and Washington and Sunderland West at the 2010 general election. David Clelland, then MP for Tyne Bridge, was chosen in December 2006 by Labour Party members to become the candidate for the Gateshead constituency at the next general election.

Following her failure to be selected for the Gateshead seat, Hodgson announced her intention to run for selection as the Labour Party candidate for the new Washington and Sunderland West seat in September 2007, and she was selected. She was elected as the MP for that seat in the 2010 general election with a majority of 11,458.

In Parliament, she has served on several select committees since her election in 2005, including the North East Regional Committee and the Children Schools and Families Committee. She has also served as the Parliamentary Private Secretary to Liam Byrne in the Home Office, Bob Ainsworth at the Ministry of Defence and Dawn Primarolo at the Department of Health. In June 2009, Hodgson was promoted to the position of assistant Government Whip.

In opposition, the then Leader of the Labour Party Ed Miliband, appointed Hodgson to the Shadow Children and Families Office in October 2010. She resigned from the role and supported Owen Smith in the failed attempt to replace Jeremy Corbyn in the 2016 Labour leadership election. Three months later, in October 2016, she was appointed the Shadow Minister for Public Health. In Keir Starmer's first opposition frontbench, Hodgson was appointed Shadow Minister for Veterans. In May 2021 Starmer appointed Hodgson his parliamentary private secretary.

Hodgson won the election in the 2024 general election in the new constituency of Washington and Gateshead South. Hodgson stood in the election for Deputy Speaker in the House of Commons held on 23 July 2024. In September 2024, she stood to be the chair of the Education Select Committee.

On 11 September 2025, her constituency office was destroyed, along with others, when the building in which it was housed was badly damaged by fire. The homeless man who admitted responsibility said it was unintentional and unrelated to Hodgson. The fire had spread from a wheelie bin he had set alight. He also admitted breaking the building's windows and stealing tools from it and smashing windows at his father's house on two occasions.

On 3 March 2026, Hodgson was appointed as Parliamentary Under-Secretary of State for Public Health and Prevention in the Department for Health and Social Care.

== Personal life ==
Hodgson is married to Alan Hodgson, whom she employed as a Parliamentary caseworker.

Parliament of the United Kingdom
Preceded by Joyce Quin	Member of Parliament for Gateshead East and Washington West; 2005–2010	Constituency abolished
New constituency	Member of Parliament for Washington and Sunderland West; 2010–2024	Constituency abolished
New constituency	Member of Parliament for Washington and Gateshead South; 2024–present	Incumbent
Political offices
Preceded by Position Established	Shadow Minister for Children and Families; 2010–2013	Succeeded by Lucy Powell
Preceded by Kate Green	Shadow Minister for Women and Equalities; 2013–2015	Succeeded by Cat Smith
Preceded by Alison McGovern	Shadow Minister for Children and Families; 2015–2016	Succeeded by Emma Lewell-Buck
Preceded by Andrew Gwynne	Shadow Minister for Public Health; 2016–2020	Succeeded by Alex Norris
Preceded by Gerald Jones	Shadow Minister for Veterans; 2020–2021	Succeeded by Stephanie Peacock
Preceded by Carolyn Harris	Parliamentary Private Secretary to the Leader of the Opposition; 2021–2023	Succeeded by Jessica Morden
Preceded by Nick Brown	Chair of the Finance Committee; 2023–2024	Succeeded by Steve Barclay
