= Liz Twist =

British politician (born 1956)

Liz Twist MP
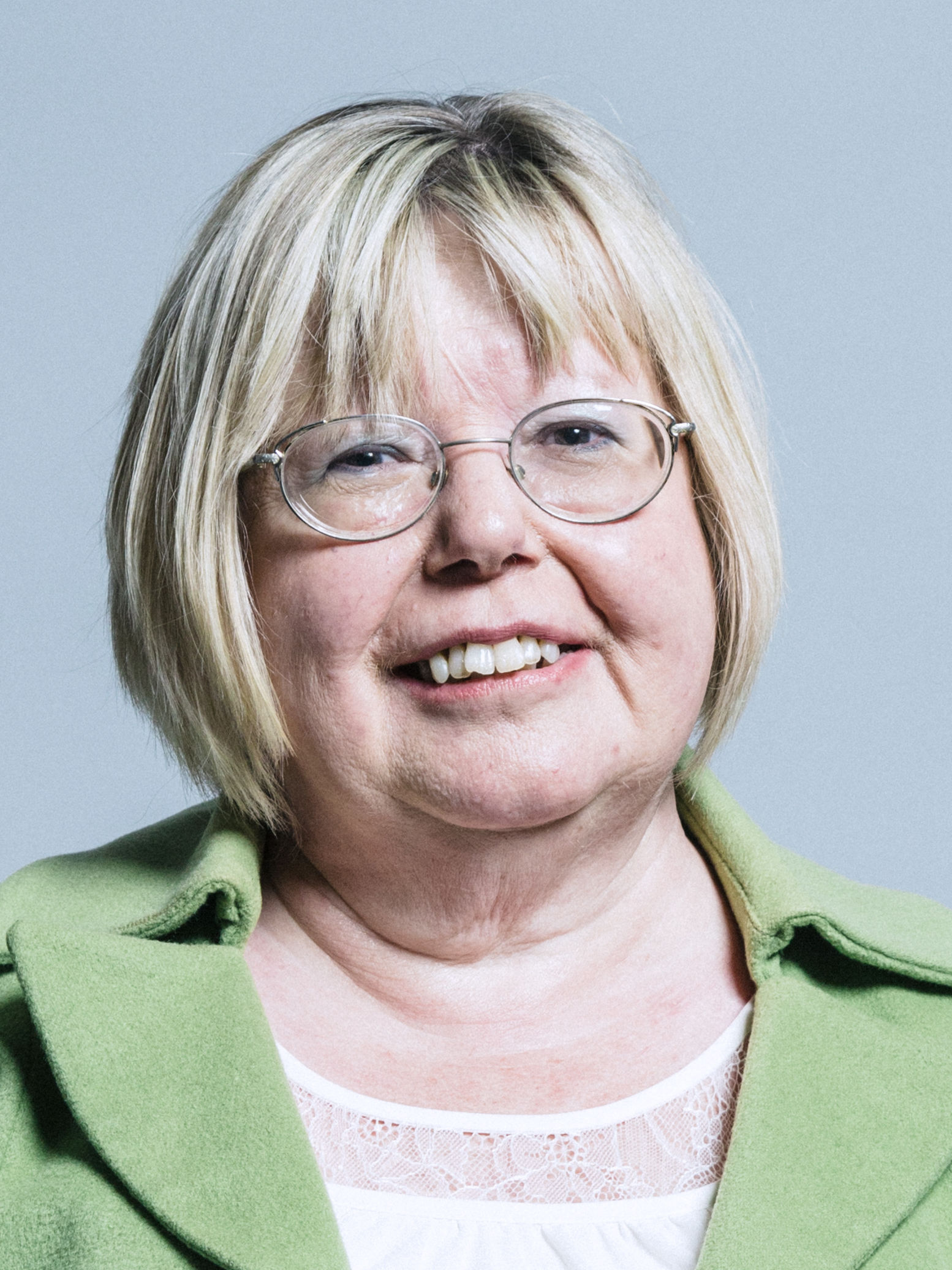
- Official portrait, 2017

Parliamentary Private Secretary to the Prime Minister
- In office 17 July 2024 – 7 September 2025 Serving with Chris Ward
- Prime Minister: Keir Starmer
- Preceded by: Craig Williams
- Succeeded by: Abena Oppong-Asare

Shadow Minister for Local Government and Services
- In office 27 November 2023 – 5 July 2024
- Leader: Keir Starmer
- Preceded by: Sarah Owen (Local Government and Faith)

Shadow Minister for Scotland
- In office 4 December 2021 – 5 September 2023
- Leader: Keir Starmer
- Preceded by: Chris Elmore
- Succeeded by: Gerald Jones

Shadow Lord Commissioner of HM Household
- In office 12 February 2020 – 5 September 2023
- Leader: Jeremy Corbyn; Keir Starmer

Member of Parliament for Blaydon and Consett Blaydon (2017–2024)
- Incumbent
- Assumed office 8 June 2017
- Preceded by: David Anderson
- Majority: 11,153 (26.4%)

Personal details
- Born: Mary Elizabeth Twist; 10 July 1956 (age 70) St Helens, Lancashire, England
- Party: Labour
- Spouse: Charlie Dix (m. 1983; died 2000)
- Education: Notre Dame High School; Aberystwyth University
- Website: liztwist.co.uk

Mary Elizabeth Twist (born 10 July 1956) is a British Labour Party politician. She served as the Member of Parliament (MP) for Blaydon from the 2017 general election until the seat's abolition in 2024. She then stood for reelection during the 2024 general election in the newly formed constituency of Blaydon and Consett which she won. Before her parliamentary career, she was the head of health in the North-East for the trade union, UNISON, and a local councillor.

== Early life and career ==
Twist was born in July 1956 in St Helens, Lancashire. She attended the Notre Dame High School (now De La Salle School, St Helens) and studied at Aberystwyth University. Twist worked as a local government archivist. She worked as a trade union official for UNISON and became their head of health in the North-East.

She credits her grandfather's activism in the National Union of Mineworkers as her inspiration to enter politics.

== Political career ==
Twist was elected as a Labour Party councillor for Ryton, Crookhill & Stella ward in the Gateshead Council in 2012. She was the cabinet member for housing on the council. Twist was re-elected in 2016.

She was elected as MP for Blaydon in the 2017 general election with a majority of 13,477 (28.0%) votes. The seat has been represented by a Labour MP since 1935. Twist had worked in the constituency office of the previous MP David Anderson who chose to stand down for personal and health reasons. In parliament, she sits on the Commons Select Committee on Standards, and the Commons Select Committee of Privileges since February 2019. Twist was a member of the Housing, Communities and Local Government Committee between September 2017 and May 2019.

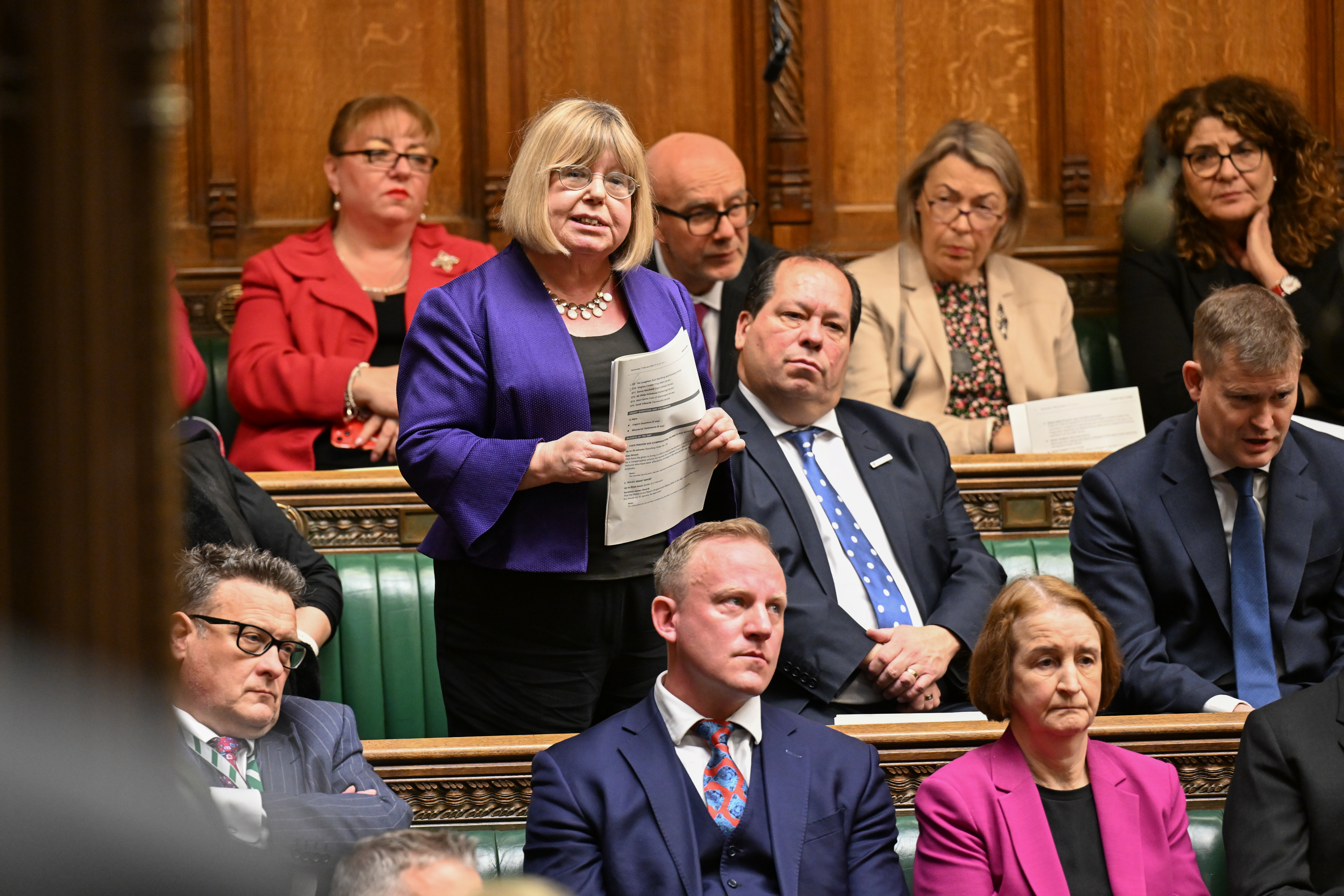
Twist speaking during Prime Minister's Questions, 7 February 2024

Twist supported the United Kingdom (UK) remaining within the European Union (EU) in the 2016 UK EU membership referendum. In the indicative votes on 27 March 2019, she voted for a referendum on a Brexit withdrawal agreement, for the Norway-plus model, and for a customs union with the EU.

She supported Emily Thornberry in the 2020 Labour leadership election.

She was appointed Shadow Scotland Minister in the November 2021 British shadow cabinet reshuffle. In the 2023 British shadow cabinet reshuffle she returned to the backbenches.

She returned to the frontbench on 27 November 2023 as Shadow Minister for Local Government and Services, after the previous Shadow Minister, Sarah Owen, resigned to vote against the Labour Party whip on a motion to back a ceasefire in Gaza.

In the 2024 general election, she successfully contested the newly named constituency of Blaydon and Consett.

Twist served as chair of Age UK Gateshead from July 2023 until her resignation in October 2024 which she cited as being connected to local criticism of her voting in favour of cutting the Winter Fuel Payment for certain people.

== Personal life ==
She is a widow. Twist disclosed in her maiden parliamentary speech in 2017 that her husband had died of suicide, and called for action on suicide prevention. She volunteers for the charity Samaritans. She lives in Ryton in her constituency.

Parliament of the United Kingdom
Preceded by David Anderson	Member of Parliament for Blaydon; 2017–2024	Constituency abolished
New constituency	Member of Parliament for Blaydon and Consett; 2024–present	Incumbent
