= Lamesley =

Village and civil parish in Tyne and Wear, England

Coordinates: 54.916°N 1.608°W

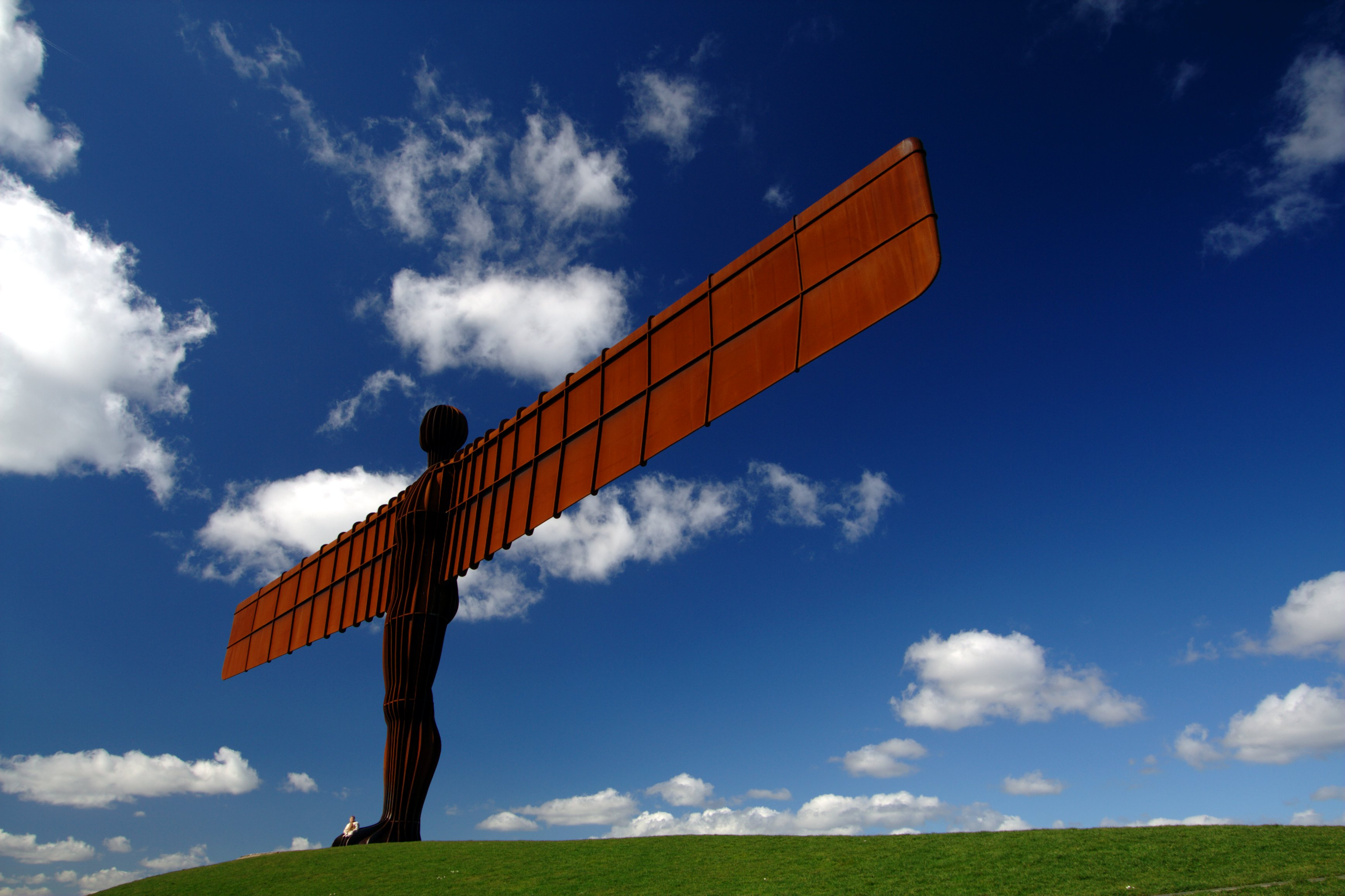
- The Angel of the North is located in Lamesley civil parish.

- Location within Tyne and Wear
- Area: 22.9 km^{2} (8.8 sq mi)
- Population: 3,742 (United Kingdom Census 2011)
  - Density: 163/km^{2} (420/sq mi)
- OS grid reference: NZ251580
- Civil parish: Lamesley
- Metropolitan borough: Gateshead
- Metropolitan county: Tyne and Wear
- Region: North East
- Country: England
- Sovereign state: United Kingdom
- Post town: GATESHEAD
- Postcode district: NE11
- Dialling code: 0191
- Police: Northumbria
- Fire: Tyne and Wear
- Ambulance: North East
- UK Parliament: Washington and Gateshead South

Lamesley is a village and civil parish in the Metropolitan Borough of Gateshead, Tyne and Wear, England. The population of the civil parish at the 2011 census was 3,742. The village is on the southern outskirts of Gateshead, near to Birtley. The parish includes Kibblesworth, Lamesley village, Eighton Banks and Northside, Birtley which is predominantly private housing in neighbourhoods named The Hollys, Long Bank, Northdene and Crathie. The ruined Ravensworth Castle is also in Lamesley.

A hilltop contemporary sculpture in the parish is the Angel of the North by Antony Gormley on a minor hilltop which is lower than the adjoining Low Fell and High Fell outside the parish.

== Demography ==
Combined, this area had a population of 3,928 people as of the 2001 census and unlike the small rise in the overall region it saw a decrease to 3,742 at the following census. The Gateshead MBC ward of Lamesley had a population of 8,662 at the 2011 Census. Both the ward and civil parish are very homogenous. For instance, in the 2011 Census, the ward was 96.9% White British.

== History ==
Evidence of a medieval village located just to the south of Haggs Lane has been documented, with ridge and furrow, field boundaries and a holloway visible as earthworks. This has been recognised as one of the best surviving medieval landscapes in the Tyne and Wear region.
