= Jackson baronets =

There have been eight baronetcies created for persons with the surname Jackson, one in the Baronetage of England, one in the Baronetage of Great Britain and six in the Baronetage of the United Kingdom. As of 2026 four of the creations are extant.

- Jackson baronets of Hickleton (1660)
- Jackson, later Duckett baronets, of Hartham House (1791): see Duckett baronets
- Jackson baronets of Fort Hill (1813): see Sir George Jackson, 1st Baronet, of Fort Hill (1776–1851)
- Jackson baronets of Arlsey (1815)
- Jackson baronets of The Manor House (1869)
- Jackson baronets of Stansted House (1902)
- Jackson baronets of Eagle House (1913)
- Jackson baronets of Wandsworth (1935): see Sir Henry Jackson, 1st Baronet (1875–1937)
