= Charles Howard, 10th Earl of Carlisle =

British soldier and Liberal Unionist politician

The Right Honourable The Earl of Carlisle DL
- Howard in 1910 when Viscount Morpeth

Member of Parliament for Birmingham South
- In office 1904–1911
- Preceded by: Joseph Powell-Williams
- Succeeded by: Leo Amery

Personal details
- Born: Charles James Stanley Howard; 8 March 1867
- Died: 20 January 1912 (aged 44)
- Party: Liberal Unionist
- Spouse: Rhoda Ankaret L'Estrange (m. 1894)
- Children: 4, including George
- Parent(s): George Howard, 9th Earl of Carlisle; The Hon. Rosalind Stanley
- Education: Rugby School
- Alma mater: Balliol College, Oxford

Charles James Stanley Howard, 10th Earl of Carlisle, DL (8 March 1867 – 20 January 1912), styled Viscount Morpeth from 1889 to 1911, was a British soldier, peer, and Liberal Unionist politician.

== Early life ==
Howard was the eldest son of George Howard, 9th Earl of Carlisle, and the Hon. Rosalind Frances Stanley. His younger brother was Geoffrey William Algernon Howard, an MP and the Vice-Chamberlain of the Household from 1911 to 1915. Upon their mother's death in 1921, his elder sister, Lady Mary (wife of Gilbert Murray) inherited Castle Howard, which was later inherited by their brother Geoffrey upon her death.

His paternal grandparents were MP for Cumberland East, the Hon. Charles Wentworth George Howard (the fifth son of George Howard, 6th Earl of Carlisle) and the former Hon. Mary Priscilla Harriet Parke (second daughter and coheiress of James Parke, 1st Baron Wensleydale). His maternal grandparents were Edward Stanley, 2nd Baron Stanley of Alderley and the former Hon. Henrietta Maria Dillon (eldest daughter of Henry Dillon, 13th Viscount Dillon).

He was educated at Rugby and Balliol College, Oxford.

== Career ==
Howard joined the British Army, and achieved the rank of Captain in the 3rd Border Regiment before he retired from the regular army. He was appointed a captain in the 5th Militia Battalion of the Rifle Brigade (The Prince Consort's Own) on 7 April 1897. The battalion was embodied for active service in the Second Boer War, and he served in South Africa until September 1902, when he returned home on the SS Avondale Castle.

In 1904, he was elected to the House of Commons for Birmingham South, a seat he held until 1911, when he succeeded his father in the earldom and entered the House of Lords. He was appointed a deputy lieutenant of Cumberland in 1905.

== Personal life ==
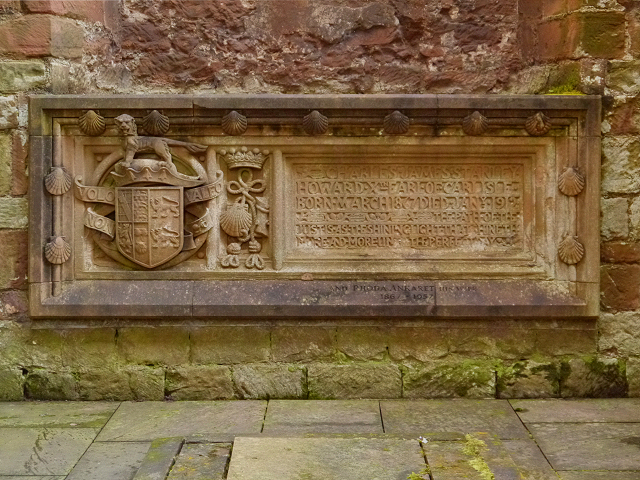
Tomb of Charles Howard, 10th Earl of Carlisle, Lanercost Priory

On 17 April 1894 Lord Carlisle married Rhoda Ankaret, daughter of Colonel Paget Walter L'Estrange and the former Emily Ryves (a daughter of General Ryves). Together, they were the parents of one son and three daughters:

- George Josslyn L'Estrange Howard, 11th Earl of Carlisle (1895–1963), who married Bridget Helen Hore-Ruthven in 1918. They divorced and he married Esme Mary Shrubb Iredell in 1947.
- Constance Howard (1897–1964), who died unmarried.
- Ankaret Cecilia Caroline Howard (1900–1945), who married William Jackson, 7th Baronet in 1927.
- Elizabeth Howard (1903–1969), who married Laurence Robert Maconochie-Welwood in 1934.

Lord Carlisle died 20 January 1912, aged 44, and was laid to rest in a tomb at Lanercost Priory, Cumbria. He was succeeded in his titles by his only son George. Lady Carlisle survived him by 45 years and died in December 1957, aged 90.

=== Descendants ===
Through his son George, he was a grandfather of Carolyn Howard (b. 1919), Charles James Ruthven Howard (1923–1994), and Susan Howard (b. 1948) from George's second marriage.

== Notes ==
Parliament of the United Kingdom
Preceded by Joseph Powell-Williams	Member of Parliament for Birmingham South; 1904–1911	Succeeded by Leo Amery
Peerage of England
Preceded by George Howard	Earl of Carlisle; 1911–1912	Succeeded by George Howard
