= Rowland Powell-Williams =

English cricketer

Rowland Powell-Williams (8 January 1872 – 16 December 1951) was an English cricketer who played first-class cricket between 1897 and 1905 for Warwickshire, London County and the Gentlemen of England. He was born in Stratford-upon-Avon, Warwickshire and died in Yelverton, Devon. Up to 1900, which includes the whole period when he played for Warwickshire, he was known as Rowland Williams.

Powell-Williams was the son of Joseph Powell Williams, a close political associate of Joseph Chamberlain, councillor and alderman in Birmingham, and member of parliament for Birmingham South from 1885 to his death in 1904.

Powell-Williams was educated at King Edward's School, Birmingham, where he was in the school cricket team, and he played for Warwickshire's "Club and Ground" side from 1890 as a middle-order right-handed batsman. He played for Warwickshire in 1893, before the club was accorded first-class status, and then reappeared in five games in 1897 and 1898; he had limited success, with his highest score being 38 when he opened the second innings in the game against Gloucestershire in 1897. Further appearances were limited by his career as a barrister in London, where he lived and played club cricket at Beckenham: two of his five Warwickshire games were away matches against Kent, and his two single first-class appearances for London County in 1902 and MCC in 1905 both took place at London County's ground at Crystal Palace Park, very close to his Beckenham home.
