= Mount Amery =

Mountain in Alberta, Canada

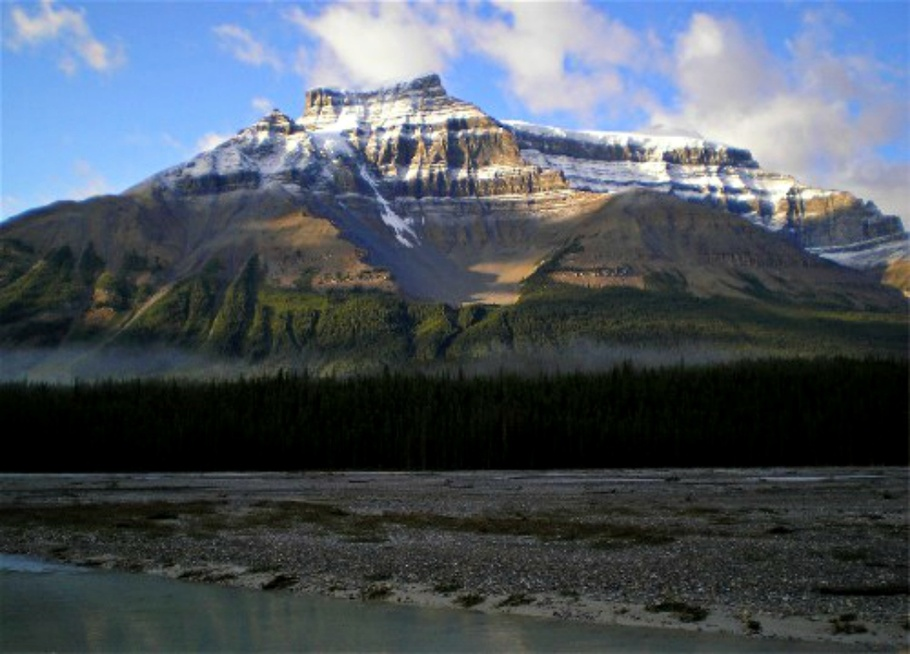
- Mount Amery seen from the Icefields Parkway

Highest point
- Elevation: 3,329 m (10,922 ft)
- Prominence: 579 m (1,900 ft)
- Parent peak: Mount Lyell (3498 m)
- Listing: Mountains of Alberta
- Coordinates: 52°02′13″N 116°58′54″W

Naming
- Etymology: Leo Amery

Geography
- Location within Alberta Location within Canada
- Country: Canada
- Province: Alberta
- Protected area: Banff National Park
- Parent range: Lyell Group, Central Icefields; Canadian Rockies
- Topo map: NTS 83C2 Cline River

Geology
- Rock type: Sedimentary

Climbing
- First ascent: 1929 by Leopold Amery, Brian Meredith, Edward Feuz Jr.
- Easiest route: technical climb

Mount Amery is a 3,329-metre (10,922-foot) mountain summit located in the North Saskatchewan River valley of Banff National Park, in the Canadian Rockies of Alberta, Canada. Its nearest higher peak is Mount Saskatchewan, 10.56 km (6.56 mi) to the northwest, but they are separated by the Alexandra River. Mount Amery can be seen from the Icefields Parkway north of Saskatchewan Crossing, with optimum photography conditions in the early morning light. Precipitation runoff from Mount Amery drains into tributaries of the Saskatchewan River.

== History ==
Mount Amery honors Leo Amery (1873-1955), who was a British politician and journalist who twice visited the Canadian Rockies. Unusually, he (along with Brian Meredith and Edward Feuz Jr.) made the first ascent of the mountain in 1929, after it had been named for him in 1928.

== Geology ==
Like other mountains in Banff Park, Mount Amery is composed of sedimentary rock laid down from the Precambrian to Jurassic periods. Formed in shallow seas, this sedimentary rock was pushed east and over the top of younger rock during the Laramide orogeny.

== Climate ==
Based on the Köppen climate classification, Mount Amery is located in a subarctic climate zone with cold, snowy winters, and mild summers. Winter temperatures can drop below -20 °C with wind chill factors below -30 °C. The months June through August offer the most favorable weather for viewing and climbing this mountain.

== Gallery ==
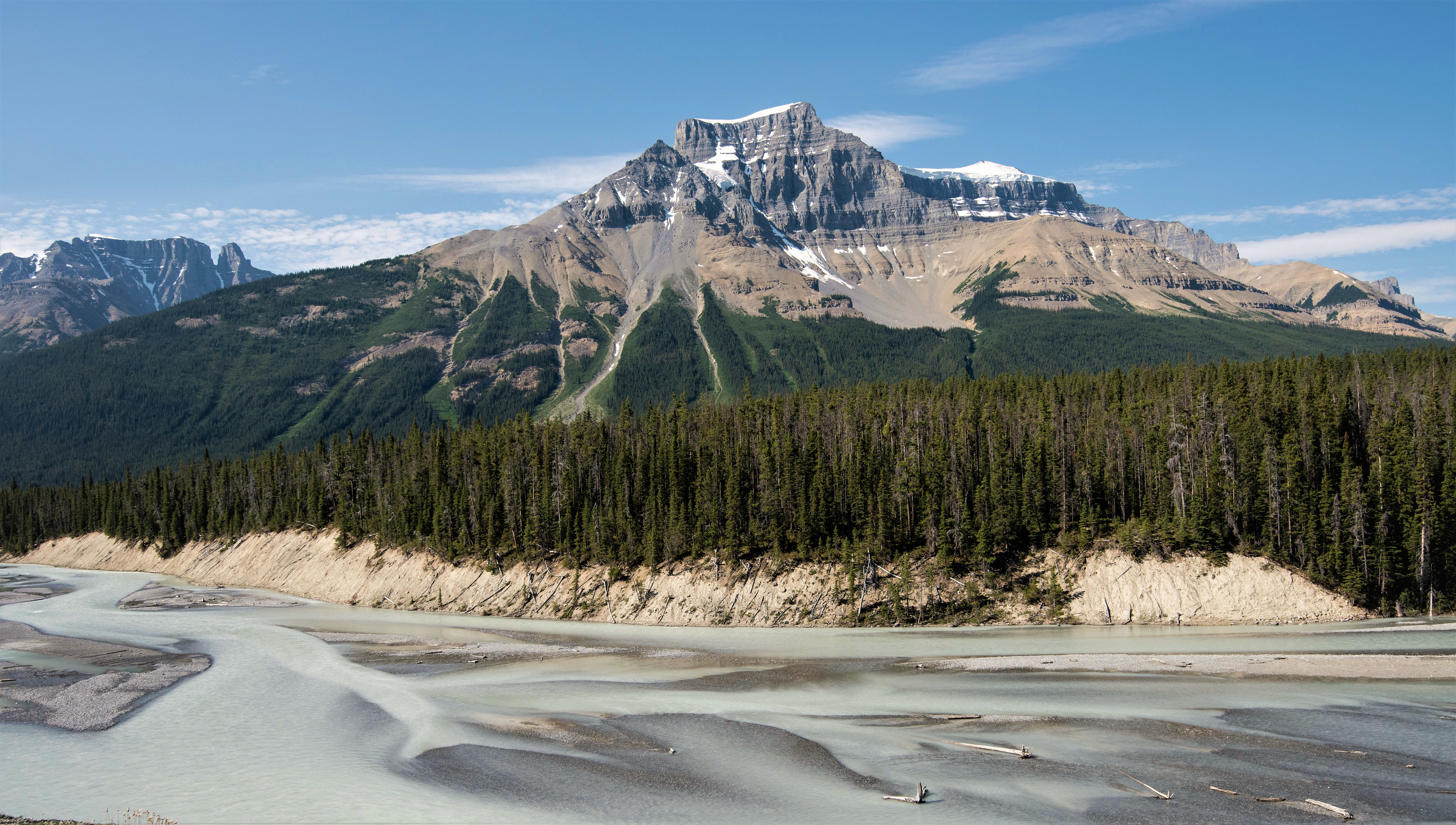

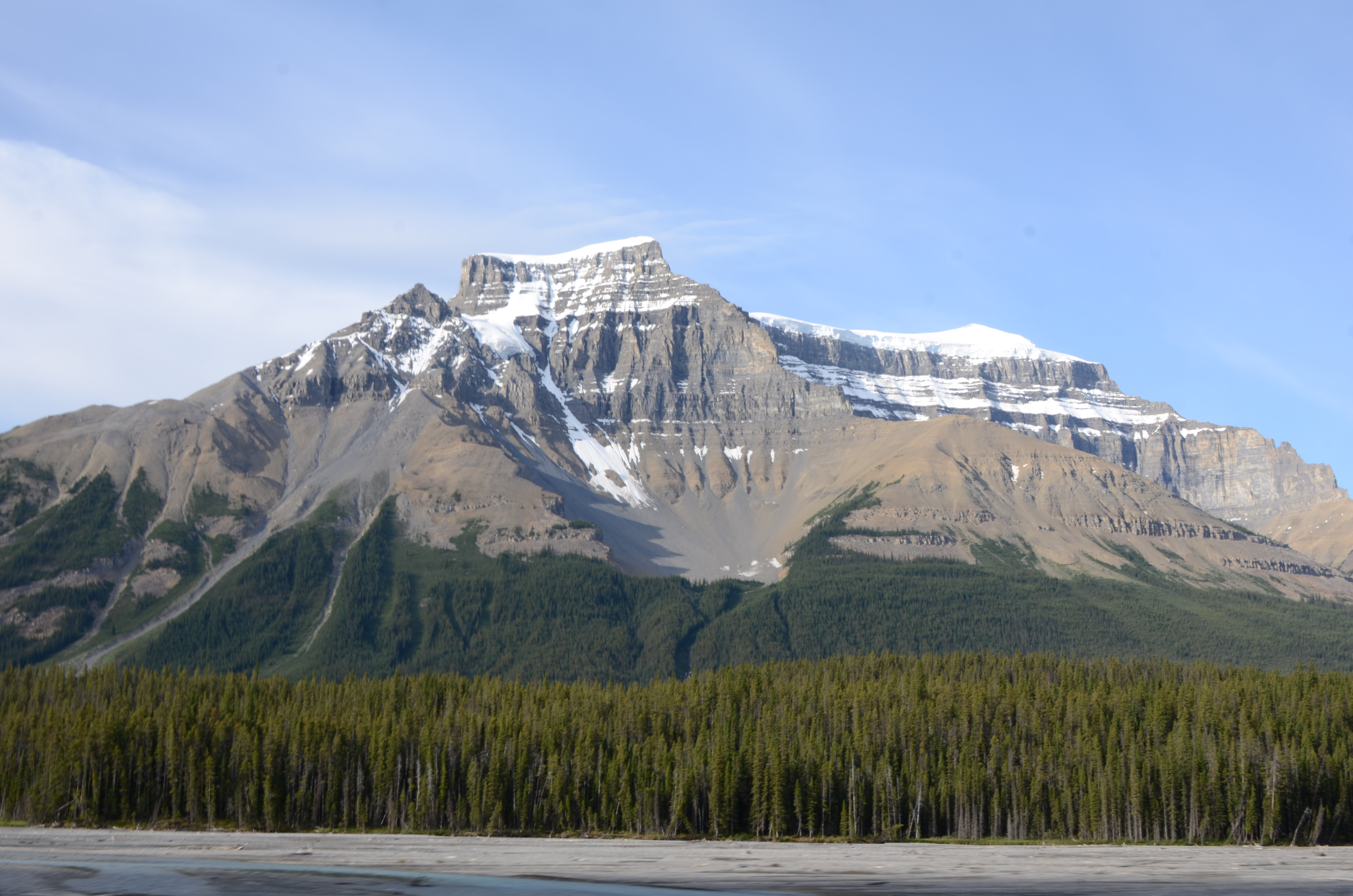

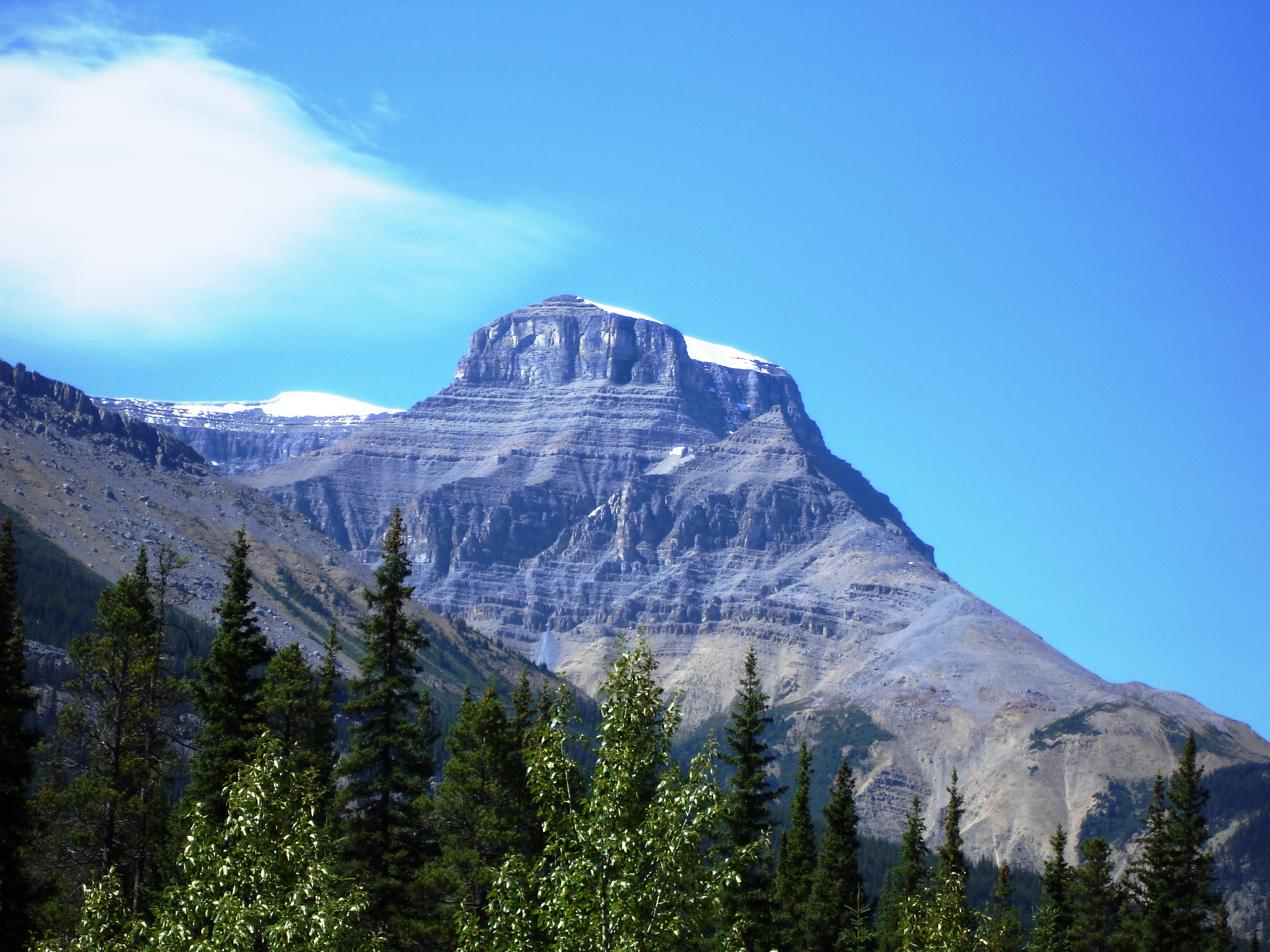

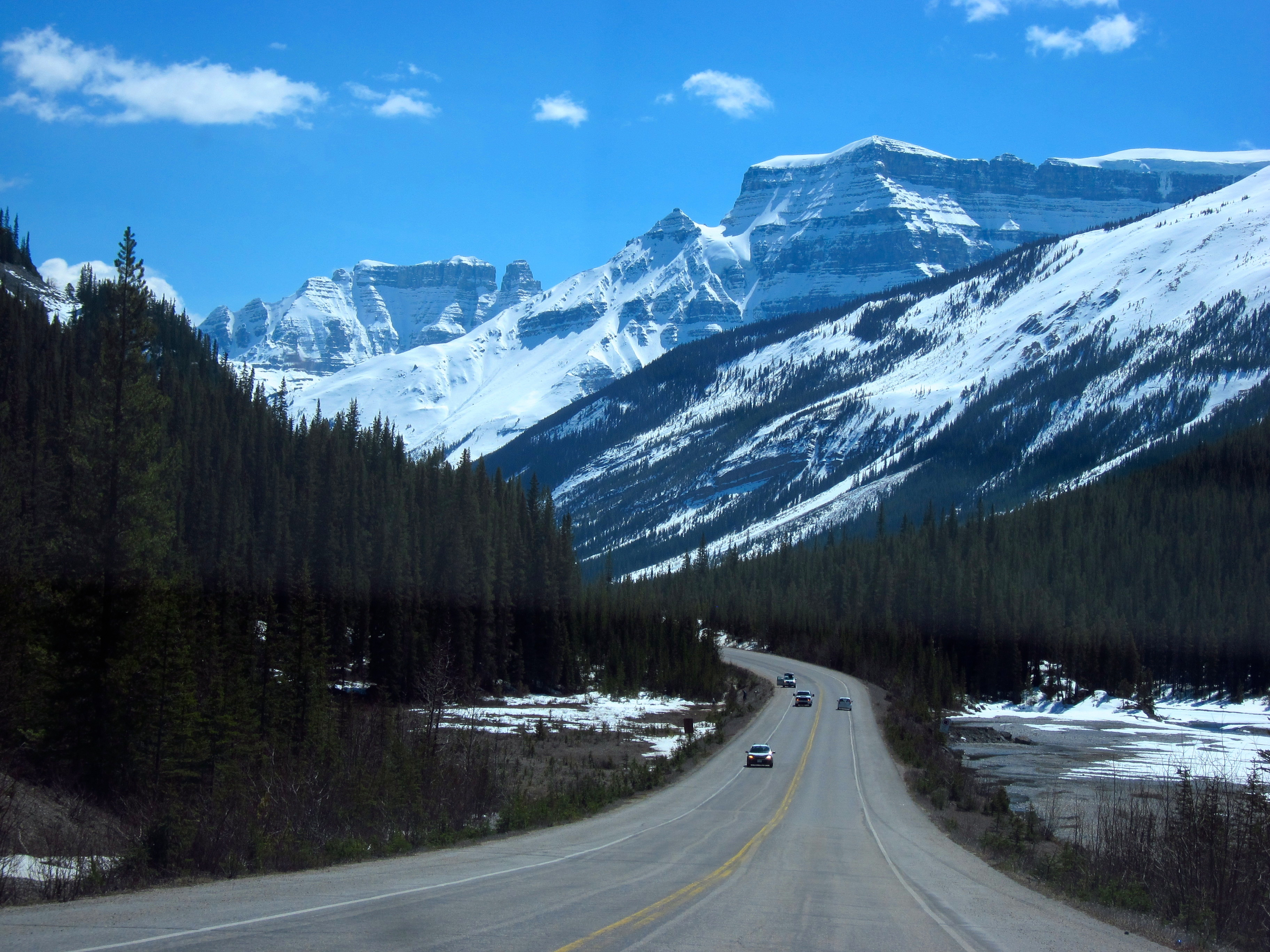
Amery in upper right

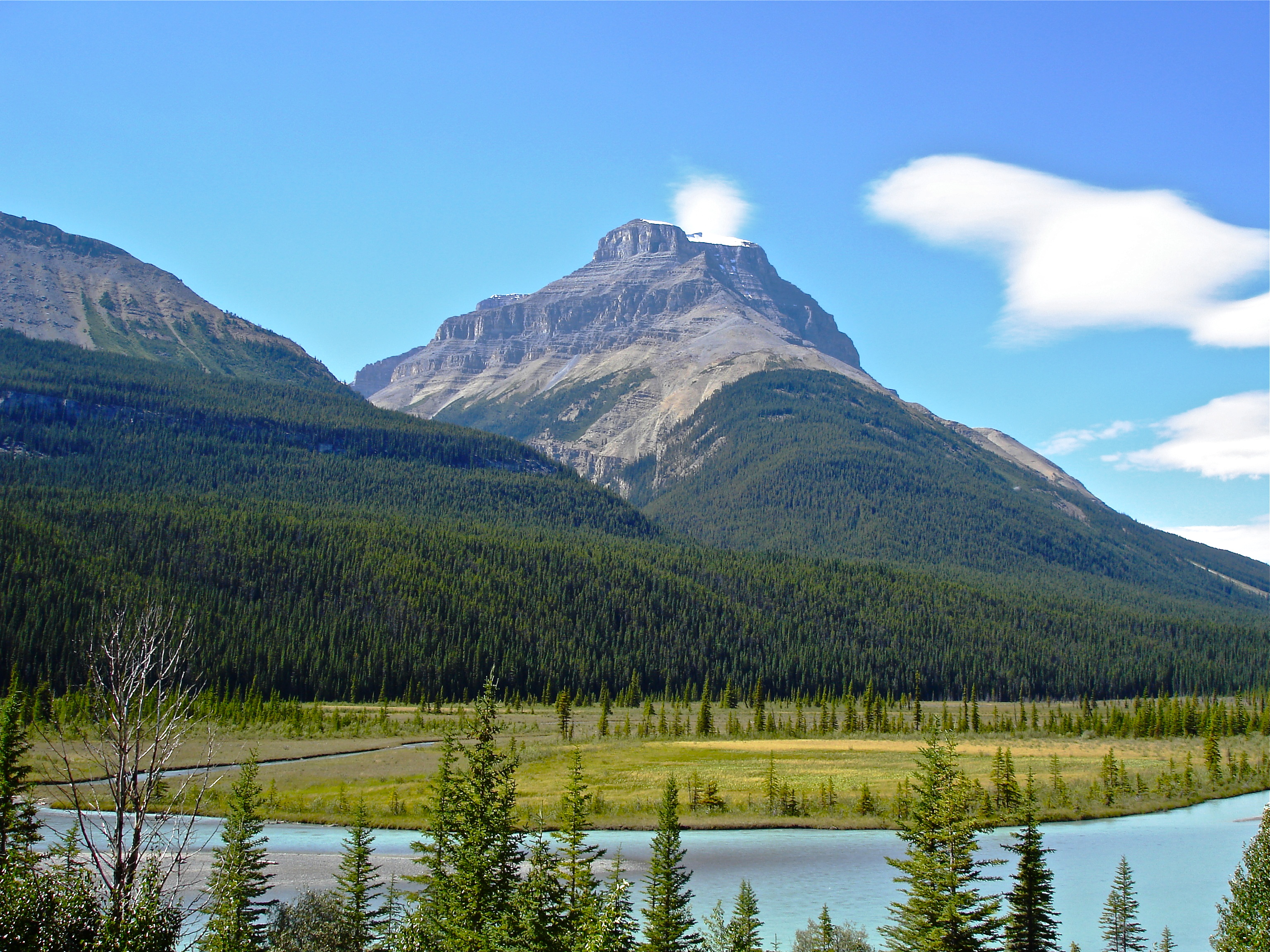

== See also ==
- Geography of Alberta
- List of mountains in the Canadian Rockies
