= 1904 Birmingham South by-election =

UK Parliamentary by-election

The 1904 Birmingham South by-election was a Parliamentary by-election held on 26 February 1904. The constituency returned one Member of Parliament (MP) to the House of Commons of the United Kingdom, elected by the first past the post voting system.

The seat had become vacant following the death of the incumbent Liberal Unionist MP, Joseph Powell Williams on 7 February 1904. Powell Williams had been Member of Parliament for the constituency since 1885.

== Candidates ==
The Liberal Unionist candidate was 37-year-old Charles Howard, Viscount Morpeth. He was the eldest son of the Earl of Carlisle. He was educated at Rugby and Balliol College, Oxford. He joined the British Army, achieved the rank of Captain in the 3rd Border Regiment and served in the Second Boer War. He had contested Chester-le-Street in 1895, Hexham in 1900, and Gateshead at the by-election in January 1904.

The Liberal Party candidate was James Hirst Hollowell. Hollowell was the secretary of the Northern Counties Education League. The League supported free, non-sectarian education. Hollowell was a former Congregationalist minister. He lived at Castlemere, Rochdale.

== Result ==
The Liberal Unionist Party held the seat.

1904 Birmingham South by-election
Party	Candidate	Votes	%	±%
Liberal Unionist	Viscount Morpeth	5,299	70.4	N/A
Liberal	James Hirst Hollowell	2,223	29.6	New
Majority		3,076	40.8	N/A
Turnout		7,522	62.8	N/A
Registered electors		11,984		
Liberal Unionist hold		Swing	N/A	
