= 1911 Birmingham South by-election =

UK Parliamentary by-election

The 1911 Birmingham South by-election was held on 3 May 1911. The by-election was held due to the incumbent Liberal Unionist MP, Charles Howard, becoming the tenth Earl of Carlisle. It was won by the Liberal Unionist candidate (who quickly became a Conservative) Leo Amery, who was unopposed.

Birmingham South by-election, 1911
Party	Candidate	Votes	%	±%
Liberal Unionist	Leo Amery	Unopposed	N/A	N/A
Liberal Unionist hold				
