= Leo Amery =

British Conservative politician (1873–1955)

The Right Honourable Leo Amery CH
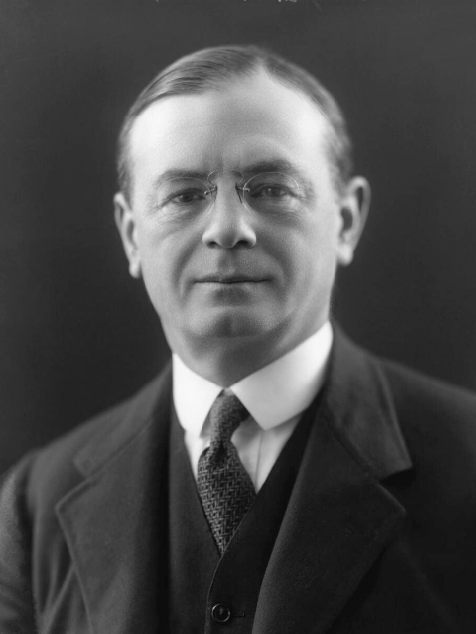

First Lord of the Admiralty
- In office 31 October 1922 – 28 January 1924
- Monarch: George V
- Prime Minister: Bonar Law; Stanley Baldwin
- Preceded by: The Lord Lee of Fareham
- Succeeded by: The Lord Chelmsford

Secretary of State for the Colonies
- In office 6 November 1924 – 4 June 1929
- Monarch: George V
- Prime Minister: Stanley Baldwin
- Preceded by: J. H. Thomas
- Succeeded by: The Lord Passfield

Secretary of State for India and Burma
- In office 13 May 1940 – 26 July 1945
- Monarch: George VI
- Prime Minister: Winston Churchill
- Preceded by: The Lord Zetland
- Succeeded by: The Lord Pethick-Lawrence

Personal details
- Born: Leopold Charles Moritz Stennett Amery; 22 November 1873 Gorakhpur, North-Western Provinces, British India
- Died: 16 September 1955 (aged 81) London, England
- Party: Conservative
- Children: Julian, Baron Amery; John Amery
- Education: Harrow School: Balliol College, Oxford; All Souls College, Oxford
- Occupation: Politician and journalist

Leopold Charles Maurice Stennett Amery (22 November 1873 – 16 September 1955), also known as L. S. Amery, was a British Conservative Party politician and journalist. During his career, he was known for his interest in military preparedness, British India, and the British Empire, and his opposition to appeasement. He was Secretary of State for the Colonies (1924–29), opposed the National Government of the 1930s, and served as Secretary of State for India during the Second World War (1940–45). He was also a prolific writer whose output included a multi-volume history of the Second Boer War and several volumes of memoirs and (posthumously published) diaries.

Nowadays he is best remembered for the remarks he made in the House of Commons on 7 May 1940 during the Norway Debate, attacking the Prime Minister, Neville Chamberlain, for incompetence in the fight against Hitler's Germany. Many of Amery's Parliamentary contemporaries pointed to this speech as one of the key drivers in the division of the House on the following day, 8 May, which led to Chamberlain being forced to resign and his replacement by Winston Churchill.

== Early life and education ==
Amery was born in Gorakhpur, British India, to an English father and a mother of Hungarian Jewish descent. His father was Charles Frederick Amery (1833–1901), of Lustleigh, Devon, an officer in the Indian Forestry Commission. His mother Elisabeth Johanna Sapir (c. 1841–1908), who was the sister of the orientalist Gottlieb Wilhelm Leitner, had come to India from England, where her parents had settled and converted to Protestantism. In 1877 his mother moved back to England from India, and in 1885 she divorced Charles.

In 1887, Amery went to Harrow School, where he competed in gymnastics, held the top position in examinations for a number of years, and won prizes and scholarships. Winston Churchill (born December 1874) was junior to him at Harrow, and on one occasion mistook Amery, who was very short in stature, for a younger boy and pushed him into Ducker, the school outdoor swimming pool. Churchill placated him by claiming that his father Lord Randolph Churchill was "a great man" but was also short, but neither man forgot the incident, and as late as June 1934 Amery would mention the incident in his diary while recording how he had humiliated Churchill in a debate over India. (Note: see Samuel Hoare, 1st Viscount Templewood#Secretary of State for India)

After Harrow he went to Balliol College, Oxford, where he performed well. He gained a double first in Classical Moderations (classical languages) in 1894 and literae humaniores ("Greats", i.e. classical literature, history and philosophy) in 1896; he was proxime accessit (runner-up) for the Craven scholarship in 1894 and Ouseley scholar in Turkish in 1896. He also won a half-blue in cross-country running.

He was elected a fellow of All Souls College. He could speak Hindi at the age of three years; Amery was born in India and would naturally have acquired the language of his ayah (nanny). He could also converse in French, German, Italian, Bulgarian, Turkish, Serbian and Hungarian.

Amery was an active freemason. He was also a member of the Coefficients dining club of social reformers, set up in 1902 by the Fabian campaigners Sidney and Beatrice Webb.

== Journalism ==
During the Second Boer War Amery was a correspondent for The Times. In 1901, in his articles on the conduct of the war, he attacked the British commander, Sir Redvers Buller, which contributed to Buller's sacking. Amery was the only correspondent to visit Boer forces and was nearly captured with Churchill. Amery later edited and largely wrote The Times History of the South African War (7 vol., 1899–1909).

The Boer War had exposed deficiencies in the British Army. In 1903 Amery wrote The Problem of the Army and advocated its reorganisation. In The Times he penned articles attacking free trade using the pseudonym "Tariff Reformer" and in 1906 he wrote The Fundamental Fallacies of Free Trade. Amery described it as "a theoretical blast of economic heresy" because he argued that the total volume of British trade was less important than the question of whether British trade was making up for the nation's lack of raw materials and food by exporting its surplus manufactured goods, shipping, and financial acumen.

== Early political career ==
Amery turned down the chance to be editor of The Observer in 1908 and of The Times in 1912 to concentrate on politics. Standing as a Liberal Unionist (a party, whose strength was by this time concentrated in and around the City of Birmingham and who were in an electoral alliance with the Conservatives) Amery narrowly failed to win the 1908 Wolverhampton East by-election, by eight votes.

In 1911 Amery stood in the 1911 Birmingham South by-election, running again as a Liberal Unionist, this time unopposed, and became a Member of Parliament (MP). One reason that Amery agreed to stand there under the Liberal Unionist label (that party would fully merge with the Conservative Party the following year) was that he had been a long-time political admirer of Joseph Chamberlain and was an ardent supporter of tariff reform and imperial federation. According to A. J. P. Taylor, Amery was a rare Conservative who promoted protectionism "as merely the beginning of a planned economy".

Amery was a noted sportsman, especially famous as a mountaineer. He continued to climb well into his sixties, especially in the Swiss Alps, but also in Bavaria, Austria, Yugoslavia, Italy, and the Canadian Rockies, where Mount Amery is named after him. He enjoyed skiing as well. He was a member of the Alpine Club (serving as its president, 1943–1945) and of the Athenaeum and Carlton Clubs. He was a Senior Knight Vice-President of the Knights of the Round Table.

On 16 November 1910, Amery married Florence Greenwood (1885–1975), daughter of the Canadian barrister John Hamar Greenwood and younger sister of Hamar Greenwood, 1st Viscount Greenwood. She was normally known by the forename Bryddie. They had two sons, John and Julian.

== First World War ==
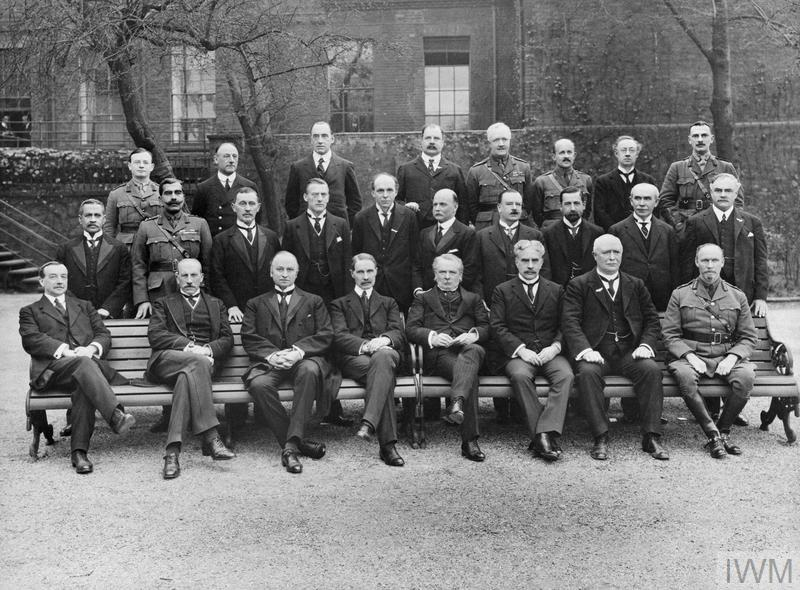
Imperial War Cabinet, 22 Mar 1917. Amery is standing, top row, first on the left.

Amery in 1917

=== Strategic perspectives ===
Amery was an "easterner" on questions of grand strategy, believing that the war was to be won in the Middle East, going so far as to characterize the Western front as a "sideshow" compared to the Near East, as opposed to "westerners" such as William Robertson and Douglas Haig who believed that the war would be won on the Western Front. In Amery's view Britain's chief aim in Europe was instead the liberation of Belgium.

Amery championed an "all-red route" to India, calling for Britain to control the sea-lanes to India not only via the Mediterranean–Suez Canal–Red Sea route, but also around the Cape of Good Hope in South Africa. Amery also advocated Britain seizing the Middle East in order to provide the best basis for maintaining British power in Asia after the war by enabling it to control the main land routes to India as well. As for Britain's allies, he advocated that the French should annex Syria and lesser Armenia from the Ottoman Empire while Russia should annex greater Armenia and Constantinople (modern Istanbul).

Amery harbored serious reservations about Britain's future relations with Russia. Amery regarded Britain's alliance with Imperial Russia as only temporary, and expected the traditional Anglo-Russian rivalry to resume after the war. After the October Revolution (November 1917 by the western calendar) Amery came to regard the new Soviet regime in Russia as a main threat to Britain's position in Asia.

Amery regarded Germany, however, as the greatest threat to the British Empire. The Reich had the world's second largest economy and had adopted a policy of Weltpolitik ("World Politics") aimed at replacing Britain as the world's dominant power. Amery argued that German attempts to dominate Europe along with the Middle East were intended to serve as the basis to make the Reich the world's number one power.

In a memo written in April 1917, Amery traced the roots of German imperialism to Prussian imperialism in the 18th century. Amery was particularly concerned with German efforts to extend the influence of the Reich to the Persian Gulf, which he believed posed a major threat to the Empire. Amery argued that with the Ottoman Empire having fallen into the German sphere of influence "and with Germany installed at the gates of Egypt on one side and in East Africa on the other, the Prussian instinct would never rest till the two were linked together, and the great railroad empire became continuous from Hamburg to Lake Nyasa". Amery expressed great concern about the possible defeat of Russia under the Provisional Government, which had taken over after the ousting of the Tsar in the February Revolution (March 1917 by the western calendar), writing that German control of Eastern Europe would be a major step towards allowing Germany to achieve "world power status".

Amery also took it for granted that Germany would continue as a major power after the war. He accordingly argued that under no circumstances should Britain and its allies return any of the German colonies in Africa and in the Pacific that had been captured during the war by the Allies, arguing that restoring the German colonial empire would allow the Reich to establish submarine bases that would threaten British shipping in the Atlantic, Indian, and Pacific Oceans. Amery also warned that he foresaw the day when technological advances would allow submarines greater range, which led him to argue that a "mesh" of land, air, and naval bases would need to be established and led him to call for British annexation of German East Africa (modern Tanzania), German Southwest Africa (modern Namibia), and the German colonies in the Pacific Ocean, along with taking Mesopotamia and Palestine from the Ottoman Empire.

Amery believed in the necessity for great states, such as the United Kingdom, to dominate the post-war world in order to provide order and stability. He was, accordingly, opposed to the Constitution of the League of Nations because he believed that the world was not equal and so the League, which granted all states equal voting rights, was absurd. He instead believed that the world was tending towards larger and larger states that made up a balanced world of inherently stable units. He contrasted that idea with what he called US President Woodrow Wilson's "facile slogan of self-determination".

=== Active service ===
During the First World War, Amery served as an intelligence officer in Flanders and saw combat in the Mediterranean, where he saved himself from capture, after his ship was torpedoed by a German submarine, by squeezing in beneath the deck of his lifeboat. Amery's knowledge of Hungarian led to his assignment to the Balkans campaign in the first two years of the war. He played a part in gathering intelligence for the disastrous Gallipoli campaign of 1915-1916, which also provided him with a first-hand view of the many mistakes that led to its failure.

=== The Monday Night Cabal and the fall of Asquith ===
Upon his return to Britain in early 1916 Amery established the "Monday Night Cabal", a "ginger group" of influential people who met at Monday night dinners to discuss war policy. Among its original members were Lord Milner, Edward Carson, Geoffrey Dawson, Waldorf Astor and F. S. Oliver; later that year it expanded to include Minister of Munitions David Lloyd George, General Henry Wilson, Philip Kerr, and Mark Jameson. It was through the Cabal, also known as the Conservative Ginger Group, that Times editor Geoffrey Dawson published a December 4, 1916 news story titled "Reconstruction" that set in motion events that caused Prime Minister H. H. Asquith to resign several days later, leading to the Lloyd George Ministry. Amery joined Lloyd George's coalition government as a parliamentary under-secretary. (Note: Amery was also involved in simillar machinations that brought down Lloyd George's coalition government in 1922.)

=== Involvement in the Middle East ===
In 1917–1918, Amery advocated as war aims the British occupation of Palestine, Mesopotamia, Persia, Arabia and the Caucasus. The Bolshevik coup in Russia in November 1917, followed by the decision by Vladimir Lenin to sign an armistice with Germany in December 1917, caused profound alarm for Amery, who argued that the new regime in Russia threatened to change the course of the war as Germany could now redeploy millions of soldiers from the Eastern Front to the Western Front, and allowed Germany the opportunity to dominate the Middle East through its proxy in the Ottoman Empire.

Besides the possibility that the Ottomans under the command of Erich von Falkenhayn might retake Baghdad, which the British had taken in 1917, he also argued that Falkenhayn would take advantage of the Russian Revolution to advance Ottoman forces into the Caucasus, Persia and finally into Central Asia. Amery expressed surprise that the Young Turk regime had not done more to achieve its pan-Turkish ambitions of uniting all the Turkic peoples into the Ottoman Empire, which he attributed to the backwardness of the Ottoman Empire.

Amery argued in late 1917-early 1918 that the Caucasus should be the prime British concern and that Britain needed to send more forces to Palestine and Mesopotamia to create an offensive line running from Alexandretta (now called İskenderun) on the Mediterranean to the Caucasus "in order to drive the Turks out of the Arab and Armenian regions and bring about a collapse of their forces and a demand for peace". Besides the Middle East, Amery was deeply concerned about Russia, writing that if the Bolsheviks took control of Odessa and the Black Sea coast of Ukraine, it would allow Germany all of the immense resources of Ukraine, and hence undercut the British blockade of Germany. He wrote that Britain needed to "knock out" the Ottomans before the Bolsheviks took control of South Russia, saying that it was critical to "get into touch with South Russia through the Dardanelles" in order to "keep our friends in Russia going" to tie down German forces on the Eastern Front.

Amery argued that now that Russia was defeated Britain should fund and arm those Armenians who had survived the Armenian genocide, along with Armenians who had served in the Imperial Russian Army, whom Amery believed would fight on as it was their only hope of survival. Amery argued that Britain had a vested interest in ensuring that former Russian weapons stayed with the Armenians who served in the Russian Army to prevent those weapons "from passing into the hands of Kurds and Tatars and be used either for massacring Armenians, or for arming pro-German gangs of brigands in Persia". Amery also envisioned British officers taking command of the proposed Armenian army.

Amery was commissioned by the Foreign Secretary Arthur Balfour to write a declaration promising the support of H.M. Government for Zionism while also taking into account the objections of the anti-Zionists in the cabinet such as Lord Curzon and Edwin Montagu. Hence the final draft of the Balfour Declaration issued on 1 November 1917 promised British support for a "Jewish national home", not a Jewish state, and likewise stated "nothing shall be done which may prejudice the civil and religious rights of existing non-Jewish communities in Palestine". He also encouraged Ze'ev Jabotinsky in the formation of the Jewish Legion for the British Army in Palestine.

== First Lord of the Admiralty ==
After the war, Amery was elected for the newly created seat of Birmingham Sparkbrook in the 1918 general election. From 1919 to 1921 he was Lord Milner's personal secretary at the Colonial Office. He was First Lord of the Admiralty (1922–1924) under Bonar Law and Stanley Baldwin. The Washington Naval Conference of 1921 to 1922 resulted in the 1922 Washington Naval Treaty, which reduced the strength of the Royal Navy and the naval estimates from over £83,000,000 to £58,000,000. Amery defended the financing of the Singapore Naval Base against both Liberal and Labour attacks.

The plans for a Singapore Strategy sparked opposition from Australian prime minister Stanley Bruce, who in a series of letters with Amery in 1923 made it clear that he much preferred that the main British naval base in the Asia-Pacific region be located in Sydney rather than Singapore. Amery in his replies to Bruce stressed that Hong Kong would serve as an "advance base" for the Royal Navy in the event of a war with Japan and that it was highly unlikely that the Japanese would attack Singapore on account of the distance between Japan and Southeast Asia. Amery argued that Sydney would serve as a secondary base, but could not serve as the main base as it was too far away from Southeast Asia. Amery convinced Bruce that the Singapore Strategy would serve to protect Australia and he dropped the demand for a naval base at Sydney.

The construction of the Singapore base, which was misleadingly presented to the public as a fortress, proceeded slowly throughout the 1920s, being cancelled by Ramsay MacDonald's Labour government of 1924, but revived by the Conservative government of Stanley Baldwin after he won the 1924 election; the Baldwin government however proceeded so slowly that the base was far from finished when Baldwin lost the 1929 election.

== Colonial Secretary ==
Amery was Colonial Secretary in Baldwin's second government from 1924 to 1929. Amery expanded the role of the Commercial Adviser into the Economic and Financial Advisership under Sir George Schuster. He also created the post of Chief Medical Adviser, under Sir Thomas Stanton, and a range of advisers on education (Sir Hanns Visscher for Tropical Africa), agriculture (Sir Frank Stockdale), a Veterinary Adviser, and a Fisheries Adviser. He also set up the Empire Marketing Board.

Amery tried unsuccessfully to develop one or more colonies into white-ruled dominions, with special attention to Southern Rhodesia (modern Zimbabwe), Kenya, and Palestine. In Africa, he sought to create an East African Dominion composed of Kenya, Uganda and Tanganyika. The strong opposition by the overwhelming non-white populations in Africa, and by the Arabs in Palestine, destroyed his plans for Dominion status in those territories. The Permanent Mandates Commission, which oversaw Tanganyika (a mandated territory), opposed Amery's plan. Amery argued that his guiding principle in East Africa was the same "dual policy" applied in Kenya, namely the "protection" of the black population while also being responsible for "the fullest development of those territories" and "those in particular of our race who had undertaken the task of that development". In effect, Amery was saying that the East African Dominion would be run in the interests of the British settlers in East Africa, especially in Kenya, which had attracted a considerable number of such settlers. The model for the proposed East African Dominion was South Africa, a Dominion dominated politically by its white population. Tanganyika had attracted a number of German settlers when it had been the colony of German East Africa, and Amery wanted to join link Tanganyika to Kenya both to give the proposed Dominion a larger white population and for economic reasons. Uganda had not attracted many white settlers, but Amery wanted to include Uganda in the proposed Dominion as its rich soil made it highly productive for agriculture.

Amery's East African federation plans ran into opposition because Tanganyikan sovereignty technically belonged not to Britain but to the League of Nations. Amery insisted that Britain did own Tanganyika, and could with it as it pleased, and that the League of Nations mandate only imposed certain standards on Britain. In a speech on 11 June 1926, Amery stated: "Our mandate in Tanganyika was in no sense a temporary tenure or lease from the League of Nations. It was rather what might be called in lawyer's language a "servitude", that is to say an obligation to observe certain rules of conduct with administration in that territory...We held Tanganyika under our obligations to the League of Nations, but we held in our right under the Treaty of Versailles. The foundations of the East Africa of the future were as sure and permanent in Tanganyika as they were in any other East African territory".

Amery's speech was vigorously rebutted by Heinrich Schnee, the last governor of German East Africa, who in an article in the Deutsche Allgemeine Zeitung newspaper on 19 June 1926 pointed out that under the terms of the Treaty of Versailles Germany had transferred sovereignty over German East Africa to the League of Nations, which appointed Britain as the administering power over what was now called Tanganyika. Schnee argued that Britain would violate the Treaty of Versailles by changing the status of Tanganyika without first obtaining the approval of the League Council (the executive arm of the League of Nations). From the German viewpoint, maintaining the Tanganyika mandate was crucial since it was always possible that the League Council (which Germany joined as a permanent veto-holding member in 1926) might restore Tanganyika to Germany.

Amery's plans for an East African Dominion also met with much opposition from the Indian merchants who dominated business life in East Africa and from the black African populations who saw the plans for a federation as a way to permanently disenfranchise them. A White Paper reflecting Amery's views stated that the claims of the white settlers in East Africa "to share progressively in the responsibilities of government could no longer be ignored" and "if clashes between these interests and those of the vast native populations are to be avoided, their [the white settlers] share in the trusteeship for the progress and welfare of the natives must be developed". The White Paper was taken as confirming Indian and African fears that the proposed "Closer Union" in East Africa was only for the benefit of the white settlers at their expense. The Conservative Party, the British settlers in Kenya, and Sir Edward Grigg, the governor of Kenya, all supported Amery's plans for a "Closer Union" in East Africa. Opposed to Amery's plans in Britain were the Labour Party; Amery's own under-secretary at the Colonial Office, William Ormsby-Gore, along with most of the civil servants of the Colonial Office; Sir Donald Cameron, the governor of Tanganyika; and various humanitarian groups who charged the federation would be run in the interests of the white settlers.

A number of former and current Colonial Office officials such as Frederick Lugard and Ormsby-Gore opposed the proposed Dominion as they preferred, as a cost-saving measure, "indirect rule" via traditional African elites. Despite what Amery claimed, the Treaty of Versailles had assigned sovereignty over Tanganyika to the League of Nations and to change the status of Tanganyika required the approval of the League Council. The German Foreign Minister, Gustav Stresemann, was very committed to regaining Germany's lost empire in Africa and made it clear to the British ambassador in Berlin that he would use the German veto at the League Council if Britain made an application to change the status of Tanganyika.

The idea of having Southern Rhodesia join South Africa as a "fifth province" was frequently mooted in the 1920s, but the unwillingness of the British settlers in Rhodesia to join an Afrikaner-dominated state ensured that nothing came of it. In 1927, Amery toured Africa and concluded that Southern Rhodesia would only join South Africa on its own terms to preserve its "British character". Amery envisioned a future where the British settlers in Southern Rhodesia would build "an independent Central South African Dominion to check and counterbalance the parochial South African Union".

In India, the strong resistance of the Congress movement defeated his hopes for greater integration into the Commonwealth. In the 1920s, the Palestine Mandate was seen as a backward, impoverished area and not the first choice for emigration of most European Jews. Amery carried out a policy of "constructive Zionism": building infrastructure such as paved roads, public sanitation and a hydroelectric grid, intended to encourage Jewish immigration. In Malta Amery's name became associated with the Royal Commission which recommended self-government for the Maltese following the 1919 riots in which four locals and one serviceman were killed. One of the most prominent streets in the resort town of Sliema was named after him.

== Out of office ==
Amery was not invited to join the National Government formed in 1931. He remained in Parliament but joined the boards of several prominent corporations. This was necessary as he had no independent means and had depleted his savings during the First World War and when he was a cabinet minister during the 1920s. Among his directorships were the boards of several German metal engineering companies (representing British capital invested in the companies), the British Southern Railway, the Gloucester Wagon Company, Marks and Spencer, the shipbuilding firm Cammell Laird and the Trust and Loan of Canada. He was also chairman of the Iraq Currency Board.

Amery spent a lot of time in Germany during the 1930s in connection with his duties as a director of German metal engineering companies, through which he gained a good understanding of German military potential. Adolf Hitler became alarmed at the situation and ordered a halt to the appointment of non-German directors. Amery was not allowed to send his director's fees out of the country so he took his family on holiday in the Bavarian Alps. He had a lengthy meeting with Hitler on at least one occasion, and he met at length with Czech leader Edvard Beneš, Austrian leaders Engelbert Dollfuss and Kurt von Schuschnigg, and Italian leader Benito Mussolini.

== Opposition to appeasement of Germany ==
In the debates on the need for an increased effort to rearm British forces, Amery tended to focus on army affairs, with Churchill speaking more about air defence and Roger Keyes talking about naval affairs. Austen Chamberlain was, until his death, a member of the group as well. While there was no question that Churchill was the most prominent and effective of the group, Amery's work was still significant. He was a driving force behind the creation of the Army League, a pressure group designed to keep the needs of the British Army before the public. Like most Conservative MPs, Amery had little faith in the League of Nations, saying in the House of Commons in 1935: "If we were victims of unprovoked aggression today we might as well call on the man in the street as make a direct appeal to the League".

In the 1930s Amery, along with Churchill, was a bitter critic of the appeasement of Germany; they often openly attacked their own party. Being a former Colonial and Dominions Secretary, he was very aware of the views of the dominions and strongly opposed returning Germany's colonies, a proposal seriously considered by Neville Chamberlain. Amery's opposition to appeasement was initially based primarily on opposition to the repeated German demand that the former German colonies in Africa "go home to the Reich". Much of the Nazi claim to the former German African colonies was based on economic grounds, as it was generally believed at the time that having African colonies to exploit was essential to the workings of European economies. The American Smoot-Hawley Tariff Act of 1930 had set off a global trade war with the world broken up into various economic zones as nations imposed record high tariffs, which were used as an argument why Germany needed its former colonial empire. On 5 February 1936, Amery was involved in a heated debate on the floor of the House of Commons with the former prime minister David Lloyd George, who suggested that Britain and the Dominions return the former German colonies, saying that it was crucial for the peace of the world. Amery attacked Lloyd George, saying that the Reich lost its colonies as a result of a war that it had caused in 1914, and if Germany needed an "economic zone" to dominate, it should look to the "great markets of Central Europe", not Africa. Amery's statements indicated that he was open to Germany having Eastern Europe in its economic zone of influence.

At a conference of the Conservative and Unionist Party's local constituency associations in June 1936, Amery spoke very strongly against returning any of the German colonies currently held as League of Nations mandates by Great Britain or the Dominions. Referring to pre-1914 colonial deals, Amery stated that it had been a mistake to import the "German menace" into Africa and that it would be a mistake to do so again, adding that Britain must not "sell white men or black men into Nazi slavery". In a review of the book Germany's Claims to Colonies by Ferdinand Joelson, Amery wrote "For the moment, there can be no other attitude to the German demand than a purely negative one. The issue should not be treated as open to discussion". However, Amery tempered his opposition to returning the former German colonies by writing that if the German government was headed by somebody other than Adolf Hitler, then perhaps "some positive solution to what underlies this demand may be found when the present ferment has worked itself out, and when a more normal outlook has regained ascendency over the great German nation". Amery conceded that the present was an age of "economic nationalism" with nations imposing high tariffs on each other, and that Hitler's claim that the global trade war was hurting the German economy was correct. Amery ended by writing that the system of Imperial preference tariffs, which had turned the British empire into one economic unit (the Ottawa Agreement of 1932), was what allowed Britain to be a great power, and it was up to Hitler to negotiate a similar system to the Imperial preference tariffs with the states of Eastern Europe.

On the rearmament question, Amery was consistent. He advocated a higher level of expenditure, but also a reappraisal of priorities through the creation of a top-level cabinet position to develop overall defence strategy so that the increased expenditures could be spent wisely. He thought that either he or Churchill should be given the post. When the post of Minister for Co-ordination of Defence was finally created and given to a political lightweight, Sir Thomas Inskip, he regarded it as a joke.

Amery differed from Churchill in hoping throughout the 1930s to foster an alliance with fascist Italy to counter the rising strength of Nazi Germany. A united front of Britain, France, and Italy would, he felt, have prevented a German occupation of Austria, especially with Czechoslovakia's support. He thus favoured appeasing Italy by tacitly conceding its claims to Ethiopia. A start was made in the so-called Stresa Front of 1935, but he felt that Britain's decision to impose economic sanctions on Italy for invading Ethiopia in 1936 drove Italy into the arms of Germany.

Amery later stated that feelings against the Soviet Union within the Conservative Party were running high in 1936 after the Soviet intervention in the Spanish Civil War on the Republican side, but by 1937 the Soviet Union "hardly came into the picture" as the passions caused by Spain had cooled. He noted that most Conservative MPs strongly disliked the Soviet Union because of the Russian debt repudiation of 1918 (the largest debt repudiation in history), which caused a number of financial problems for Britain, and also for the continuing Comintern propaganda. During the Sudetenland crisis of 1938, Amery moved away somewhat from his anti-Soviet views as he stated it was a "fundamental mistake" by Chamberlain to treat the Soviet offer of help for Czechoslovakia as a joke, saying that it was a major blunder by the prime minister "to refuse to take Russia into his confidence". Amery favoured Churchill's approach of creating a "grand alliance" of the Soviet Union, France and Britain to deter Germany from invading Czechoslovakia. During two meetings both held on 26 September 1938, the first at the office of General Edward Spears and the second at Churchill's flat, Amery negotiated with Churchill, Spears, the Liberal leader Archibald Sinclair and the president of the League of Nations Union Viscount Cecil to find a way to create the "grand alliance". Amery wrote in his diary that the main theme of the meetings was the importance of "bringing Russia into the picture" and that he was "all for pressing the government on this". He wrote that "it was not only the Western powers that were concerned about Czechoslovakia. In Russian eyes it was an outpost and bastion of Slavdom...the key to the whole strategic picture in Central Europe, not to be lightly surrendered to a declared enemy".

Amery himself found advocating an alliance with the Soviet Union distasteful as he never concealed his dislike of the Communist regime, but felt in that 1938 it was the lesser evil. However, Amery admitted that as a Conservative MP it was difficult to be a rebel against Chamberlain, a man who commanded the loyalty and respect of most of the Conservative MPs, writing that Churchill "wished for some public declaration by us, as Conservatives, that we stood for co-operation with Russia, to which I strongly objected". Amery stated he could not make this declaration as it would be the effective end of his political career by rebelling against a popular leader in favour of an alliance with a state he hated. Amery further noted that it was widely understood by military experts that the purge of senior officers in the Yezhovschina had wrecked the Red Army at least for the moment and that the Soviet Union had no border with Czechoslovakia, writing that if Germany invaded Czechoslovakia "Russia could not, indeed, have sent direct aid to Czechoslovakia, even by air, without Romanian or Hungarian consent". However, he noted that the Soviet Union as an ally could "have threatened action against Poland and Hungary, to restrain them from falling on Czechoslovakia's rear".

When Chamberlain announced his flight to Munich to the cheers of the House, Amery was one of only four members who remained seated (the others were Churchill, Anthony Eden, and Harold Nicolson). In 1939, Amery joined Churchill, Lloyd George, Harold Macmillan, Brendan Bracken, Victor Cazalet and most of the Labour Party in voting against the White Paper introduced by the Colonial Secretary Malcolm MacDonald that sharply limited Jewish immigration to the Palestine Mandate. When war came Amery, a lifelong anti-Communist, opposed cooperation with the Soviet Union against Germany.

== Second World War ==
Amery is famous for two moments of high drama in the House of Commons early in the Second World War. On 2 September 1939, Neville Chamberlain spoke in a Commons debate and strongly implied that he was not declaring war on Germany immediately even if it had invaded Poland. Amery was greatly angered, and Chamberlain was felt by many present to be out of touch with the temper of the British people. As Labour Party leader Clement Attlee was absent, Arthur Greenwood stood up in his place and announced that he was speaking for Labour. Amery shouted, "Speak for England!" That strongly implied that Chamberlain was not doing so (in fact the delay was caused by waiting for the French to promise to go to war also).

The second incident occurred during the Norway Debate in 1940. Following the failure of the Norwegian campaign, Amery told the House of Commons: "If we had held Trondheim, the isolated German force at Narvik would have been bound to surrender". After a string of military and naval disasters had been announced, Amery attacked Chamberlain's government in a devastating speech, finishing by quoting Oliver Cromwell's words dismissing the Rump Parliament: "You have sat too long here for any good you have been doing. Depart, I say, and let us have done with you. In the name of God, go!" Lloyd George afterwards told Amery that in fifty years, he had heard few speeches that matched his in sustained power and none with so dramatic a climax.

The debate led to 42 Conservative Members of Parliament voting against Chamberlain and 36 abstaining, leading to the downfall of the Conservative-dominated National Government and the formation of a new coalition government under Churchill. Amery himself noted in his diary that he believed that his speech was one of his best received in the House and that he had made a difference to the outcome of the debate.

== Secretary of State for India and Burma ==
During the Churchill war ministry Amery was Secretary of State for India despite the fact that Churchill and Amery had long disagreed on the fate of India. Amery was disappointed not to be made a member of the small War Cabinet, but he was determined to do all he could in the position he was offered. He was continually frustrated by Churchill's intransigence, and in his memoirs, he recorded that Churchill knew "as much of the Indian problem as George III did of the American colonies". Though committed to the British Empire, Amery thought Churchill's views towards India were unrealistic. Amery was the only India Secretary to have been born in India and he was fluent in Sanskrit, giving him a closer commitment to India than previous India Secretaries.

In the autumn of 1941 as war with Japan loomed, the Governor of Burma, Reginald Dorman-Smith, had agreed that the Burmese prime minister, U Saw, should go to London to discuss with Amery and Churchill Dominion status for Burma. Amery was less than enthusiastic about meeting U Saw. Churchill had no interest in Dominion status for Burma and agreed to see U Saw only once with the rest of the talks to be handled by Amery. U Saw duly arrived in London in October 1941 for a series of inconclusive meetings with Amery, where he was told that the issue of Burmese independence was complex. On the morning of 7 December 1941, Japan attacked the British Empire with Hong Kong and Malaya being bombed and invaded that day. U Saw, who was in Lisbon on his way home to Burma, stopped by at the Japanese embassy to offer his support for Burma joining the Greater East Asia Co-Prosperity Sphere. As the British had broken the Japanese codes, Amery was well aware of what U Saw had done. Amery sent a message to Dorman-Smith ordering that U Saw was to be arrested immediately upon his return to Burma for his "treacherous act".

On 2 February 1942, Amery told the cabinet that the recent British defeats in Asia had shattered the prestige of the British Raj at a time when Britain needed the support of the Indians the most, and that the government would have to change its policy and engage with Indian public opinion to win their support for the war. Later in February 1942, the Chinese leader Chiang Kai-shek and his charismatic English-speaking wife Soong Mei-ling visited India on a well received visit, offering the message that the Greater East Asia Co-prosperity Sphere was a sham and warning starkly that when Japan invaded India the Imperial Japanese Army would treat the Indian people just as badly as it had treated the Chinese, repeating atrocities such as the Rape of Nanking. Chiang urged the British to promise India independence after the war, but also urged Indians to support the British war effort, saying that British rule was preferable to Japanese rule. The favourable reception of Chiang's visit to India seemed to offer a way forward to win the war in Asia.

In March 1942, the cabinet dispatched Stafford Cripps, a prominent left-wing politician (expelled from the Labour Party in 1939) and for the two previous years ambassador to the Soviet Union, on a mission to India to offer Dominion status for India after the war in exchange for Indian support for the British war effort, but with the additional condition that Britain would concede the demand of Muhammad Ali Jinnah's Muslim League for a separate nation for Indian Muslims to be called Pakistan. Cripps landed in India on 22 March 1942. Upon hearing of the Cripps mission, the Viceroy of India, Lord Linlithgow, asked Amery "Why?" Amery assured Linlithgow that the purpose of the Cripps mission was to "help" him rule India by ending the opposition of the Congress Party to the Raj.

The American President Franklin D. Roosevelt had made it clear to Churchill that he believed that Britain should grant independence to India. It was difficult for Churchill to reject Roosevelt's advice outright, much as he wanted to do so, as the Lend-Lease program meant that Britain had been economically subsidised by the United States since 1941. Amery seemed to regard the Cripps mission as only useful for its effect on American public opinion as he wrote to Linlithgow in March 1942 that American public opinion would be impressed by "us sending out someone who has always been an extreme Left-Winger and in close touch with Nehru". Amery believed that the Cripps Mission would fail as the British offer of independence for India was also tied to a partition of India, a condition that both he and Churchill knew would be rejected by Mohandas Gandhi and Jawaharlal Nehru, who wanted independence without partition. There was a split within the Congress Party between Gandhi, who took an absolute pacifistic position of opposing all wars on principle, versus Nehru, who took a more anti-fascist position and often suggested that he was prepared to support Britain provided independence was promised for India.

In one speech, Nehru had declared: "Hitler and Japan must go to hell! I shall fight them to the end and this is my policy. I shall also fight Mr. Subhas Bose and his party along with Japan if he comes to India." During his talks with Cripps, Nehru was quite willing to accept Cripps' offer of Dominion status after the war in exchange for Congress Party support for the war, saying it was imperative that the Axis powers be defeated, and that Japan would be a far worse colonial master for India than Britain. The Cripps-Nehru talks broke down, however, on the Pakistan question as Nehru was unwilling to accept the partition of India, and told Cripps that this part of his offer was unacceptable. Gandhi argued that the offer of independence tied to Pakistan as well as independence for the Princely States would lead to the "Balkanisation of India", and Nehru agreed with him. Churchill argued to Roosevelt that Indian Muslims made up the majority of the Indian Army and that India had 100 million Muslims, making it the most populous Muslim community in the world, and Britain could not afford to anger Jinnah of the Muslim League, who wanted independence with partition.

On 6 April 1942, the Cripps mission ended in failure as Gandhi and Nehru rejected Cripps's offer of independence after the war in exchange for support for the British war effort; as a dejected Cripps prepared to return to London, the Japanese bombed Calcutta for the first time. The Congress Party was deeply distrustful of the British and were angry about Amery having apparently given the Muslim League the right to create Pakistan as part of the deal. For their part, Amery, along with other British officials, believed that Gandhi was extremely naïve in thinking that peaceful "soul force" would be all that would be needed to stop the Japanese invasion, then apparently imminent. Despite the loss of Burma, Amery was corresponding with Dorman-Smith in August 1942 about not only how best to restore British rule in Burma after Japan was defeated, but also plans to annex Thailand on account of Thailand joining the war on the Axis side.

In August 1942, Gandhi and Nehru launched the Quit India Movement protests, starting the largest demonstrations yet against the Raj, demanding that the British grant India independence immediately. Linlithgow in a report to Amery called the Quit India movement "the most serious [uprising] since that of 1857". Officially, 1,028 Indians were killed during the protests, but the number may have actually as high as 25,000. Linlithgow also complained that the protests were being well covered by the American media and wrote to Amery asking him "to arrest at least for a time this flow of well meaning sentimentalists". Despite the massive demonstrations along with associated sabotage, Churchill insisted that most Indians were still loyal to the Raj as Churchill believed the Muslims, Sikhs and Christian communities of India along with untouchable caste and all of the Indians living in the Princely States were all loyal and by his estimate 300 million of the 400 million Indians wanted the British to stay. Churchill tended to conflate volunteers for the Indian Army with support for the Raj, and he assumed that because the Indian Army were still meeting its recruiting targets that this reflected widespread public support for the Raj.

Most of the Indians volunteering for the Indian Army in 1942 were Muslims, and notably the Indian Army had difficulty recruiting Hindus, the most numerous of India's many religious groups. Unlike the Congress Party, the Muslim League had declared its support for the war, and Jinnah and the other Muslim leaders encouraged Indian Muslims to enlist in the Indian Army. Churchill expressed much anger at the Quit India movement, and Amery complained about Churchill's "Nazi-like" attitude towards Indians, especially Hindus, along with a belief that Churchill was wrong in believing that 300 million Indians supported the Raj. As too many Indians were taking part in the Quit India protests, it was impossible to jail all of them, leading the Raj to resort to corporal punishment with Indians being flogged for protesting. After newspaper accounts of "dreadfulness" about the floggings, Amery assured the House of Commons that the police were not flogging people with Cat o' nine tails whips, but instead with "light rattan canes" to "deter hooligans".

Amery did not mention that being flogged with "light rattan canes" was immensely painful but he argued that mass floggings were necessary as there were far more "hooligans" taking part in the Quit India protests than were prisons for them. Much to Amery's relief, the Indian Army, which was called out as an aid to civil power as the police forces were overwhelmed by the Quit India protests, stayed loyal to the Raj. Amery reported to the cabinet on 24 August 1942 that "the soldiers regard Congress as contemptible politicians". Amery stated that within the Indian Army the general feeling was that the prime danger facing India was a Japanese invasion, and most of the Indian soldiers felt that the timing of the Quit India movement was very wrong. As a result of the uprising, the Congress Party was banned while the Muslim League, which was opposed to Quit India, remained legal.

In December 1942, Linlithgow reported to Amery of a "disastrous deterioration of supplies" and that a famine was imminent in the Bengal province. In January 1943, Amery reported to the cabinet that food shortages were becoming a major problem in India. Before 1942, 15% of the rice consumed in India had come from Burma, and the Japanese conquest of Burma had cut India off from the Burmese rice crop. Adding to the shortages were a series of cyclones that devastated the rice crop in Bengal province in the autumn of 1942, and by December 1942 children and old people in Bengal were starving to death, as it was reported to London that India was short of one million tons of rice that were necessary to feed its people. When Linlithgow decided to retire as Viceroy in 1943, Amery recommended to Churchill that he appoint either the Foreign Secretary Anthony Eden or the Deputy Prime Minister Clement Attlee as the next Viceroy. Churchill refused on the grounds that he needed both Eden and Attlee in the cabinet.

On 8 June 1943, Amery nominated himself as the next Viceroy, writing in a memo to the prime minister of: "...the very special difficulties which a new Viceroy will have to handle. The whole situation in India today depends upon the Viceroy's ability from the onset to manage and impose his personality upon a Council composed mainly of Indians, men of individual ability and goodwill, but easily ratted or turned sour by hesitant or clumsy handling. They are like an Indian elephant, who with a good mahout, will face a charging tiger; if the mahout is stupid, or loses his nerve for a second, nothing can stop the beast from stampeding in terror...a stampede that may wreck the whole fabric of government in India". Amery concluded that since the "very best men" such as Eden and Attlee could not be spared to serve as Viceroy, "as a last resort, I have already offered you myself". Churchill instead chose Field Marshal Archibald Wavell as the next Viceroy in the hope that Wavell would pursue a repressive policy towards Indian demands for independence.

Contrary to Churchill's hopes, Wavell proved far more willing than Linlithgow to negotiate with the Indians as he sought a political solution instead of the military solution that Churchill had hoped for. Amery tended to support Wavell's efforts to reach a political solution and consistently spoke in defence of Wavell in cabinet meetings. Churchill wanted to appoint Air Chief Marshal Sir Sholto Douglas as the new Supreme Commander of South-East Asia Command to replace Wavell following his promotion to Viceroy of India, but Roosevelt vetoed that choice on the account of Douglas's anti-Americanism. Admiral Andrew Cunningham next declined the offer and, at Amery's suggestion, Churchill appointed Admiral Louis Mountbatten as the Southeast Asia Supreme Commander.

In July 1943, the Raj reported that a famine had broken out in Bengal province and that it would necessary to ship 5,000,000 tons of grain from Australia to feed the starving people of Bengal. Amery wrote in his diary that at a cabinet meeting on 4 August 1943 he made the case for the grain shipments "in as strong terms as I could", but was overruled by the cabinet. The War Secretary, James Grigg, stated that there was more than enough grain in India to feed the Bengalis and that the famine had been caused by Indian merchants hoarding grain to speculate on higher prices, leading him to conclude that this was an Indian problem that the Indians could solve on their own. On 5 August 1943, Churchill promised Amery that if the famine continued to worsen, the matter would be discussed at the next cabinet meeting. However Churchill left for the First Quebec Conference with President Roosevelt shortly thereafter, and no more cabinet meetings were held in the absence of the prime minister. During the famine, both Wavell and Amery consistently fought for food to be sent to Bengal. In the autumn of 1943, following further lobbying by Amery, the cabinet agreed that 50,000 tons of Australian wheat would go to Bengal with the first shipment arriving in November 1943.

Amery opposed holding an inquiry for the 1943 Bengal famine, fearing that the political consequences could be "disastrous". In 1944, the Famine Inquiry Commission was held against his advice. The report by the inquiry ruled that Bengal famine was "avoidable" and was due to "mismanagement" by both the Raj and the Bengal government. Unlike Churchill, who had a marked dislike of Gandhi and the Congress Party and favoured Jinnah and the Muslim League, Amery had a strong dislike of Jinnah, to whom he referred as "the future emperor of Pakistan", charging that Jinnah was championing the idea of partition of India because creating Pakistan was the only way he ever hope to attain power, as the Muslim League represented only Muslims, and thus could not hope to win an Indian general election. Amery wrote that the concept of Pakistan was "essentially a negation" that would cause a bloodbath if the idea of partition of India was actually executed. Likewise, Amery was opposed to Churchill's offer of Dominion status for India being tied to Dominion status for the all 565 Princely States, which he called "princestans", and thought was unrealistic as most of the princely states were extremely small, being enclaves the size of a municipal borough.

In 1944, the British cabinet learned of an unusual offer from the Reichsfūhrer SS, Heinrich Himmler, that he was willing to suspend the deportation of the Jews of Hungary to the Auschwitz death camp in exchange for 10,000 lorries for the Wehrmacht to be used on the Eastern Front. This was an obvious attempt to break up the "Big Three" alliance of the Soviet Union, the United States and the United Kingdom. Amery told the Zionist leader Chaim Weizmann about the "monstrous German blackmailing offer to release a million Jews in return for ten thousand lorries and other equipment, failing which bargain they proposed to exterminate them". Amery expressed much sympathy writing that both he and Cripps were in favour of keeping the commitments made by the latter in 1942 while Churchill was not.

In May 1944, Wavell ordered the release of Gandhi, who had been imprisoned since August 1942, on the grounds that if the Mahatma were to die in prison, it would set off massive riots. Wavell reported to Amery that Gandhi and Jinnah were not planning to meet anytime soon and he expected no resolution in the "deadlock" between the Congress Party and the Muslim League. Wavell added that both Gandhi and Jinnah were "intransigents" and neither had any willingness to compromise.

Amery in his reply to Wavell stated that the Allies were finally advancing in Italy and that "we might be on the outskirts of Rome in a few days". Amery further noted that many of the soldiers in the British Eighth Army that was marching north in Italy were Indian, and he hoped that the Indian newspapers were giving sufficient publicity to the achievements of the Indian "tiger soldiers" in Italy, which he wanted to be seen as a model of Anglo-Indian cooperation in a common cause. In July 1944, Wavell reported to Amery that Gandhi might be willing to compromise by accepting the idea of Pakistan, but only with borders that would be so unfavourable that Pakistan would not be economically viable, as Pakistan's only ports under Gandhi's plan would be Karachi and Dacca (modern Dhaka). Wavell added: "One can hardly blame Jinnah for thinking twice before swallowing this whole". Wavell along with other senior civil servants of the Raj warned that to attempt to partition the Punjab would cause a bloodbath, as the Sikh and Muslim communities of the Punjab would tear each other apart, and it would be better to keep India together by making concessions to the Indian Muslim minority.

To further complicate matters, many Sikhs were unhappy about having to choose between Muslim majority Pakistan vs. Hindu majority India, and wanted the Punjab to be independent, a demand rejected by both Jinnah and Gandhi. Wavell reported to Amery that Gandhi was utterly incapable of understanding Jinnah's fears that the Muslim minority would be oppressed in Hindu majority India, and he was not willing to make any compromises that might persuade Jinnah to drop his demand for Pakistan. Wavell himself favoured a compromise to avoid partition by making independent India into a federation with a weak central government and strong provincial governments, (Note: This was similar to the proposals of the Government of India Act 1935 which had set up elected provincial governments,) which he hoped might persuade Jinnah that the Indian Muslims would not be oppressed. Amery himself advanced a similar plan though he felt Wavell's efforts along these lines were too crude and blunt, reflecting his background as a soldier, and that he as a politician was better suited for this task.

Amery became increasing frustrated with what he regarded as Churchill's obstinate and unrealistic views on India. He felt that it was impossible for a liberal democratic state to repress the demands for independence from the better part of 400 million people without betraying its values, and that the best that could be done in India was to make a deal with the moderate Indian nationalists for support for the British war effort in exchange for Dominion status after the war. Amery often wrote in his diary that Churchill's belief that no political solution was possible nor desirable and that the Indians could simply be repressed into being docile subjects of the Raj was as impractical as it was amoral. On 4 August 1944, Wavell reported that Gandhi had offered to end the Quit India protests and to support the British war effort in exchange for an immediate grant of Dominion status for India with no partition. Wavell rejected Gandhi's offer, but himself offered to form a transitional government with a cabinet headed by Indians that would be granted Dominion status after the war in exchange for the Congress Party supporting the war effort.

Amery's differing outlook towards India tended to push him towards the margins as he and Churchill had very different visions of the future of India. In the cabinet, Amery supported Wavell's offer, saying it was the best way to end the disorders in India and bring the majority of the Indians over to supporting the war; Churchill by contrast was completely opposed and expressed much regret that he ever appointed Wavell as Viceroy. Churchill told the cabinet that Wavell should never negotiate at with Gandhi, a man whom Churchill called "a thoroughly evil force, hostile to us in every fibre, largely in the hands of native vested interest". Churchill stated that Wavell was a disgrace as he was willing to talk to Gandhi, whom Churchill stated was "a traitor who ought to be put back into prison!" Amery wrote in his diary on 4 August 1944 that Churchill had attacked his patriotism and claimed that he supported the interests of "Indian moneylenders over Englishmen" in India. Amery concluded in his diary: "Naturally, I lost patience, and I couldn't help telling him that I didn't see much difference between his outlook and Hitler's, which annoyed him no little. I am by no means certain whatever on the subject of India he is totally sane".

The next day, Churchill drafted a reply to Gandhi's offer that demanded radical changes to the status of the untouchables as a condition, which Amery criticised as negotiating in bad faith, noting that Churchill had never been much interested in improving the conditions of the untouchables before, and his demand about the untouchables was a wedge issue intended to divide the higher caste Hindus from the untouchables. Churchill told him that he planned "after the war he was going to go back on all the shameful story of the last twenty years of surrender". Churchill told Amery that he envisioned India as a British colony forever, that he would never grant independence to India under any conditions, and that he planned to "carry out a great regeneration of India based on extinguishing landlords and oppressive industrialists and uplift the peasant and untouchable, probably by collectivisation on Russian lines. It might be necessary to get rid of wretched sentimentalists like Wavell and most of the present English officials in India, who were more Indian than the Indians, and send out new men".

In a satire of Churchill's views, Amery wrote a mock memo entitled "The Regeneration of India: Memorandum by the Prime Minister", where pretending to be Churchill Amery wrote: "As the victorious end of this glorious struggle for human freedom draws near, the time is coming for a policy in relation to India more worthy of our true selves. We have had enough...of shameful pledges about Indian self-government, and of sickening surrenders to babu agitation. If we went even further two years ago in an open invitation to Indians to unite and kick us out of India that was only because we were in a hole. That peril is over and obviously a new situation has arisen of which we are fully entitled to take advantage". Continuing on his theme, Amery as Churchill wrote about Wavell that he was a man who: "...would not only appear to have taken our pledges seriously, but to be imbued with a miserable sneaking sympathy for what are called Indian aspirations, not to speak of an inveterate and scandalous propensity to defend Indian interests as against those of their own country, and a readiness to see British workers sweat and toil for generations in order to swell even further the distended paunches of Hindu moneylenders".

Amery continued his satire by writing that the Raj should aim at the destruction of the Hindu caste system and making the untouchables the equal of the other castes, which might generate resistance, leading him to write that "it will also be necessary, following an excellent Russian precedent, to forbid any but trusted officials to leave India or to allow any visitors from outside except under the closest supervision by an official Intourist Agency." Amery as Churchill concluded that India would require a regime of martial law permanently to put an end to Indian demands for independence which would require a force of 1,600,000 British police officers and 8,000,000 Indian police officers along with the entire Indian Army and most of the British Army. Amery intended his memo to be a parody meant to show how impractical Churchill's views were as the immense number of policemen and soldiers that would be needed to enforce permanent martial law in India would seriously strain the British budget at a time when Britain was financially dependent on the United States.

The suggestion of the "excellent Russian precedent" was meant to show that Churchill would have to use methods similar to Joseph Stalin's in the Soviet Union to achieve his vision of India as a permanent British colony. Amery's support for Indian independence was not based on any sense of sympathy for Indian nationalism, but rather as the best way of securing British influence in South Asia, as he believed that India as a Dominion would be rather like other Dominions such as Australia, Canada and New Zealand who generally followed Britain's lead. As late as 1947 in a letter to Churchill just after Attlee announced the end of the Raj Amery expressed the viewpoint that "we can only hope, that somehow or other, the Britannic orbit will remain a reality in this parlous world even if, to assume the worst, Indian politicians are unwise enough to break the formal link".

== Last years ==
At the 1945 general election, Amery lost his seat to Labour's Percy Shurmer. He was offered a peerage but declined it, because it might, upon his death, have cut short his son Julian's political career in the House of Commons. However, he was made a Member of the Order of the Companions of Honour. In February 1947, after Attlee announced that British India would be granted independence and partitioned into the new nations of India and Pakistan, Amery wrote a letter to the last Viceroy, Lord Mountbatten, promising that he would write a lengthy letter to The Times "to steady Conservative opinion here in case Winston proved factious". In retirement, Amery published a three-volume autobiography My Political Life (1953–1955).

== Legacy ==
Throughout his political career, Amery was an exponent of Imperial unity, as he saw the British Empire as a force for justice and progress in the world. He strongly supported the evolution of the dominions into independent nations bound to Britain by ties of kinship, trade, defence and a common pride in the Empire. He also supported the gradual evolution of the colonies, particularly India, to the same status, unlike Churchill, a free trader, who was less interested in the Empire as such and more in Britain itself as a great power. Amery felt that Britain itself was too weak to maintain its great power position.

Amery was very active in imperial affairs during the 1920s and 1930s. He was in charge of colonial affairs and relations with the dominions from 1924 to 1929. In the 1930s, he was a member of the Empire Industries Association and a chief organiser of the huge rally celebrating the empire at the Royal Albert Hall in 1936 marking the centenary of Joseph Chamberlain's birth. Amery maintained a very busy speaking schedule, with almost 200 engagements between 1936 and 1938, many of them devoted to imperial topics, especially Imperial Preference. Amery distrusted the administration of US President Franklin Roosevelt. He resented American pressure on Canada to oppose imperial free trade. While that pressure was unsuccessful as long as Canadian Conservative Prime Minister Richard Bedford Bennett was in power, after Bennett lost the 1935 election his Liberal successor William Lyon Mackenzie King adopted a more pro-American stance.

Amery wanted to keep the UK and the newly independent British Dominions united by trade behind a common tariff barrier and away from the United States. He viewed American intentions regarding the British Empire with increasingly grave suspicion. He hoped the Labour government elected in 1945 would resist promises of trade liberalisation made by Churchill to the United States during the Second World War. Amery's hopes were partially vindicated when the Attlee government, under intense American pressure, insisted upon the continuation of Imperial/Commonwealth Preference but conceded its more limited scope and promised against further expansion.

== Personal life ==
Amery's elder son, John Amery (1912–1945), became a Nazi sympathiser. During the Second World War he made propaganda broadcasts from Germany, and induced a few British prisoners of war to join the German-controlled British Free Corps. After the war, he was tried for treason, pleaded guilty, and was hanged. His father amended his entry in Who's Who to read "one s[on]", with the editors' permission. The playwright Ronald Harwood, who explored the relationship between Leo and John Amery in his play An English Tragedy (2008), considered it significant to the son's story that the father had apparently concealed his partly-Jewish ancestry.

Amery's younger son, Julian Amery (1919–1996), served first in the Royal Air Force and then the British Army during World War Two, and later became a Conservative politician. He served in the cabinets of Harold Macmillan, whose daughter Catherine he had married, and Sir Alec Douglas-Home as Minister for Air (1960-1962) and Aviation (1962–1964) and also was Minister for Housing and Construction, followed by Foreign Office posts under Edward Heath. His longstanding and enthusiastic support for Rhodesia's Unilateral Declaration of Independence and the white minority regime in Rhodesia ultimately caused him to break with Margaret Thatcher when she withdrew support for Ian Smith's continued rule in 1979.

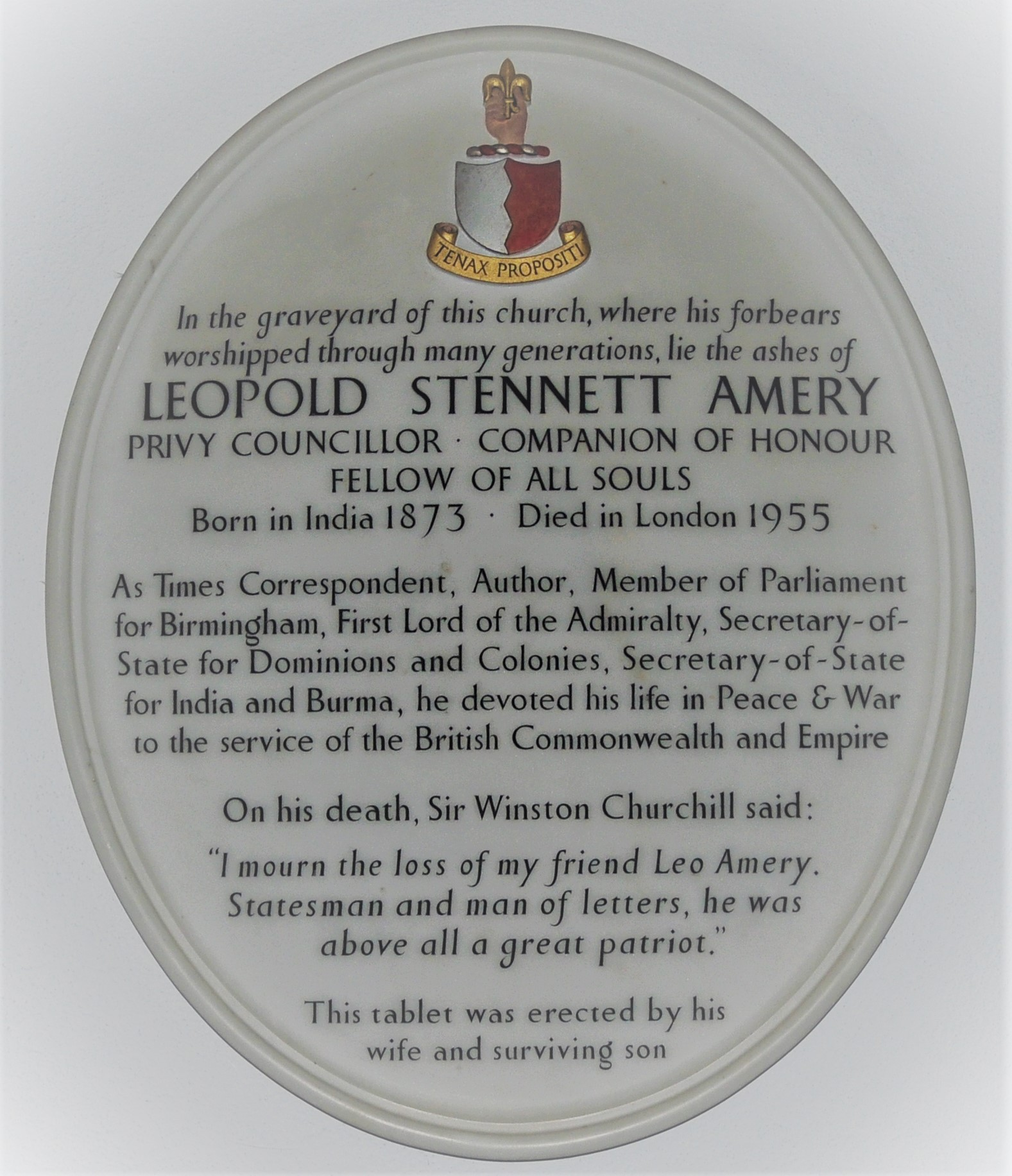
Plaque celebrating Leo Amery in the church of St John the Baptist in Lustleigh, Devon

Amery is buried in the churchyard of St John the Baptist in his father's home village of Lustleigh, and an ornate plaque in commemoration of him is inside the church.

== Publications ==
- Leo Amery, The Problem of the Army (1903) Link.
- Leo Amery, Fundamental Fallacies of Free Trade (1906) Link.
- Leo Amery, 'The Times' History of the war in South Africa, 1899–1900 (Vol I) (1900) Link.
- Leo Amery, 'The Times' History of the war in South Africa, 1899–1900 (Vol II) (1902) Link.
- Leo Amery, 'The Times' History of the war in South Africa, 1899–1900 (Vol III) (1905) Link.
- Leo Amery, 'The Times' History of the war in South Africa, 1899–1902 (Vol IV) (1906) Link.
- Leo Amery, 'The Times' History of the war in South Africa, 1899–1902 (Vol V) (1907) Link.
- Leo Amery, 'The Times' History of the war in South Africa, 1899–1902 (Vol VI) (1909) Link.
- Leo Amery, 'The Times' History of the war in South Africa, 1899–1902 (Vol VII) (1909) Link.
- Leo Amery, The Great Question: Tariff Reform or Free Trade? (1909) Link to library source.
- Leo Amery, Union and Strength (1912) Link.
- Leo Amery, The Empire in the New Era (1928) Link to library source.
- Leo Amery, Empire and Prosperity (1930) short work Link to library source.
- Leo Amery, A Plan of Action (1932) Link.
- Leo Amery, The Stranger of the Ulysses (1934) Link to library source.
- Leo Amery, The Forward View (1935) Link.
- Leo Amery, The Odyssey: Presidential address delivered to the Classical association (1936) short work Link to library source.
- Leo Amery, The German Colonial Claim (1939) Link to library source.
- Leo Amery, Days of Fresh Air (1939) Link.
- Leo Amery, India and Freedom (1942) Link to library source.
- Leo Amery, The Framework for the Future (1944) Link to library source.
- Leo Amery, The Washington Loan Agreements (1945) Link to library source.
- Leo Amery, In the Rain and the Sun (1946) Link to library source.
- Leo Amery, Thoughts on the Constitution (1947) Link.
- Leo Amery, The Elizabethan Spirit (1948) short work Link to library source
- Leo Amery, The Awakening: Our Present Crisis and the Way Out (1948) Link to library source.
- Leo Amery, Thought and Language (1949) short work Link to library source.
- Leo Amery, My Political Life, Volume I, England Before the Storm, 1896–1914 (1953) Link.
- Leo Amery, My Political Life, Volume II, War and Peace, 1914–1929 (1953) Link.
- Leo Amery, My Political Life, Volume III, The Unforgiving Years, 1929–1940 (1955) Link.
- Leo Amery, A Balanced Economy (1954) Link to library source.
- Leo Amery, The Leo Amery diaries 1896–1929 (Vol I) (1980) Link to library source.
- Leo Amery, The Empire at bay: the Leo Amery diaries 1929–1945 (Vol II) (1988) Link to library source.

Parliament of the United Kingdom
Preceded by Viscount Morpeth	Member of Parliament for Birmingham South; 1911–1918	Constituency abolished
New constituency	Member of Parliament for Birmingham Sparkbrook; 1918–1945	Succeeded by Percy Shurmer
Political offices
Preceded by William Hewins	Under-Secretary of State for the Colonies; 1919–1921	Succeeded by Edward Wood
Preceded by The Lord Lee of Fareham	First Lord of the Admiralty; 1922–1924	Succeeded by The Viscount Chelmsford
Preceded by James Henry Thomas	Secretary of State for the Colonies; 1924–1929	Succeeded by The Lord Passfield
New title	Secretary of State for Dominion Affairs; 1925–1929	Succeeded by The Lord Passfield
Preceded by The Marquess of Zetland	Secretary of State for India and Burma; 1940–1945	Succeeded by The Lord Pethick-Lawrence
