= Jackson baronets of Hickleton (1660) =

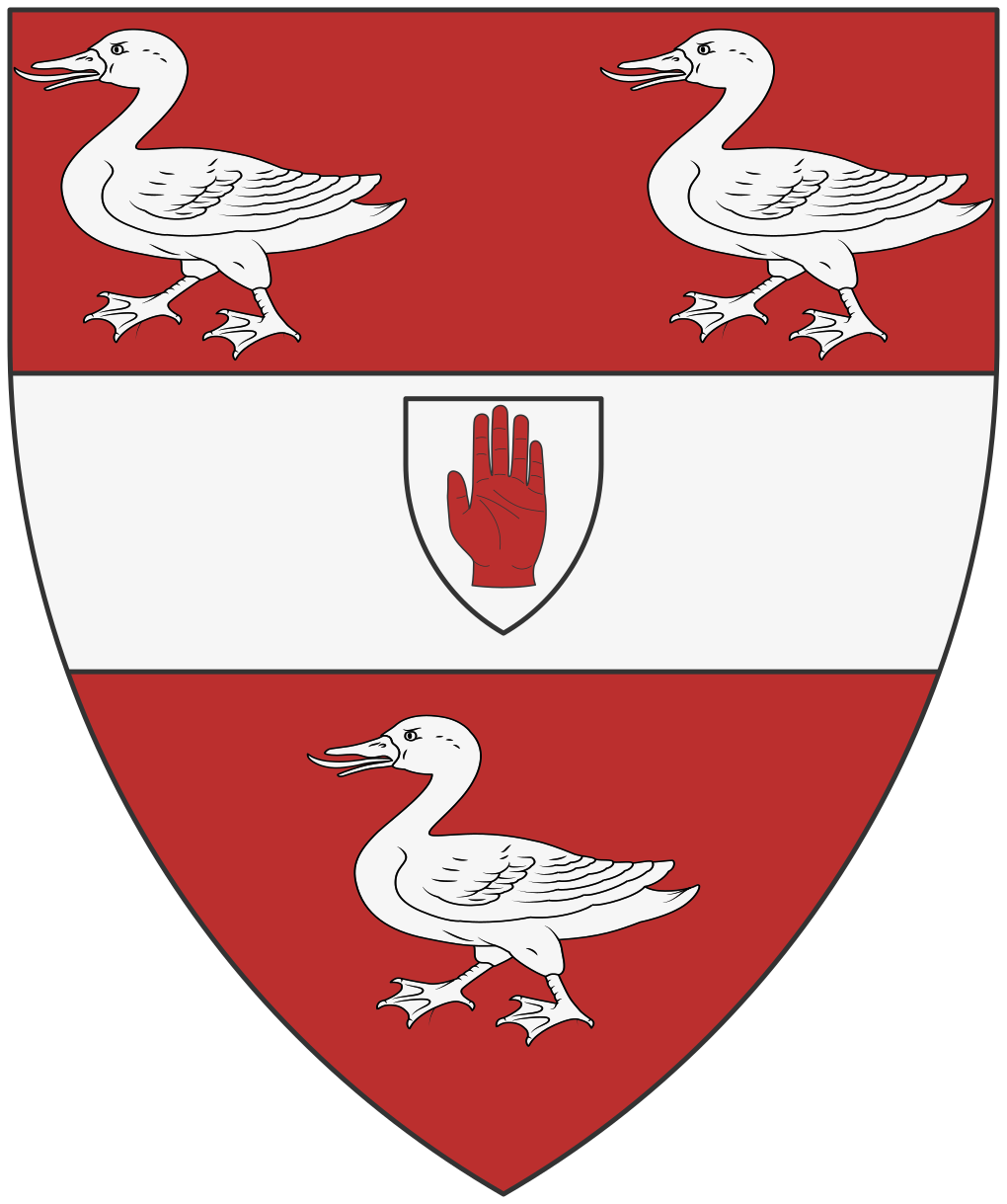
The coat of arms of Jackson of Hickleton, Baronets.

The Jackson baronetcy, of Hickleton in the County of York, was created in the Baronetage of England on 31 December 1660 for John Jackson, brother-in-law of George Booth, 1st Baron Delamer. The title became extinct on the death of the 3rd Baronet c. 1730.

== Jackson baronets, of Hickleton (1660) ==
- Sir John Jackson, 1st Baronet (c. 1631 – c. 1670)
- Sir John Jackson, 2nd Baronet (1653–1680)
- Sir Bradwardine Jackson, 3rd Baronet (c. 1670 – c. 1730)
