= Birmingham South (UK Parliament constituency) =

Parliamentary constituency in the United Kingdom, 1885–1918

- Former borough constituency for the House of Commons

1885–1918
- Seats: One
- Created from: Birmingham
- Replaced by: Birmingham Deritend, Birmingham Moseley

Birmingham South was a parliamentary constituency in Birmingham which returned one Member of Parliament (MP) to the House of Commons of the Parliament of the United Kingdom from 1885 until it was abolished for the 1918 general election.

Elections were held using the first-past-the-post voting system.

== Boundaries ==
Before 1885 the city of Birmingham had been a three-member constituency (see Birmingham UK Parliament constituency for further details). Under the Redistribution of Seats Act 1885 the parliamentary borough of Birmingham was split into seven single-member divisions, one of which was Birmingham South. It consisted of the wards of Deritend and St Martin, and part of the local government district of Balsall Heath.

The division was bounded to the west by Birmingham Edgbaston, to the north-west by Birmingham Central, to the north by Birmingham East, to the east by Birmingham Bordesley and in the south by the then city boundary and the East Worcestershire constituency.

In the 1918 redistribution of parliamentary seats, the Representation of the People Act 1918 provided for twelve new Birmingham divisions. The South division was abolished.

== Members of Parliament ==
Year	Member	Party
1885	Joseph Powell-Williams	Liberal
1886	Joseph Powell-Williams	Liberal Unionist
1904	Viscount Morpeth	Liberal Unionist
1911	Leo Amery	Liberal Unionist
1912	Leo Amery	Unionist
1918	Constituency abolished	

== Elections ==
=== Elections in the 1880s ===
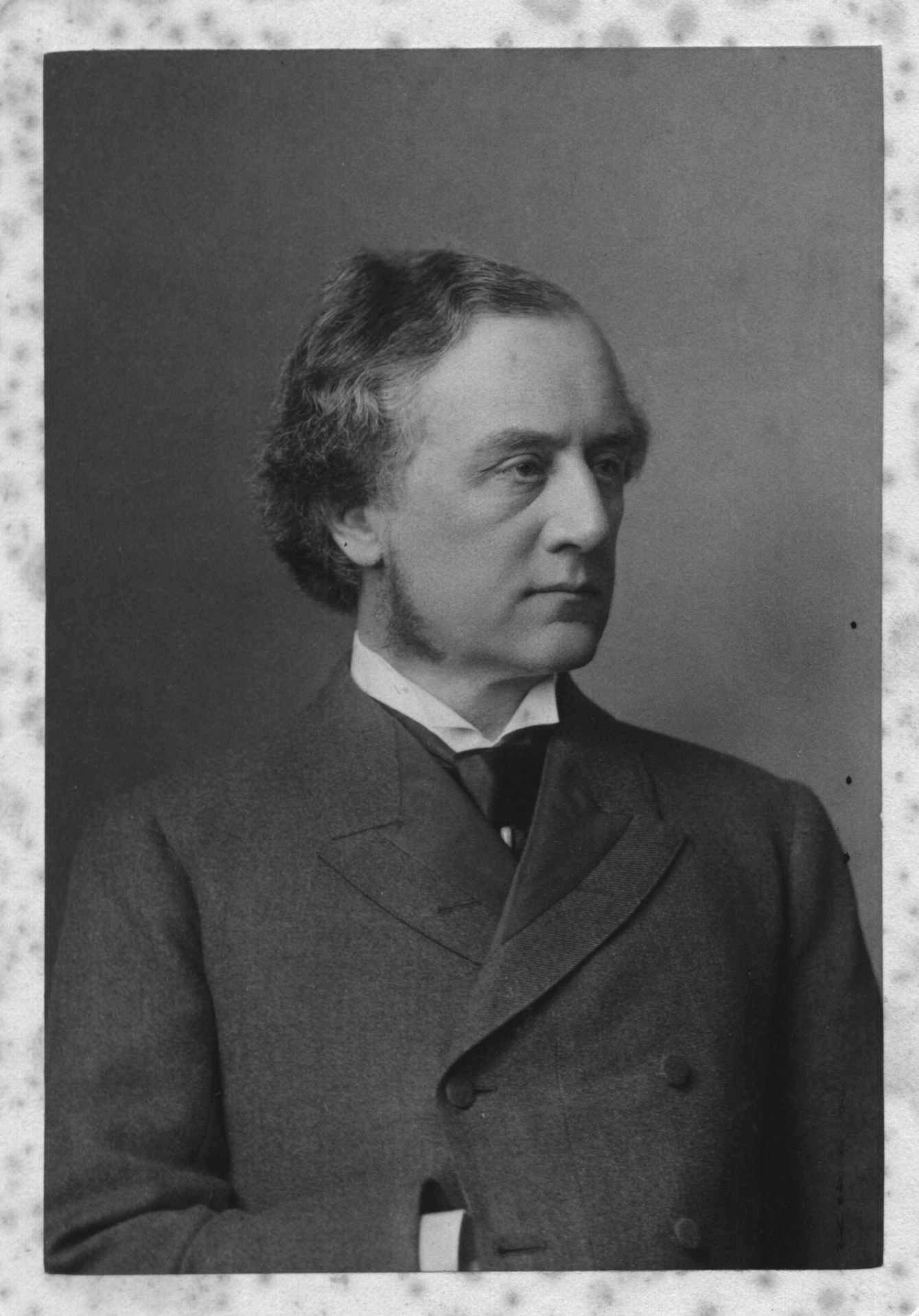
Williams

General election 1885: Birmingham South
Party	Candidate	Votes	%	±%
Liberal	Joseph Powell Williams	5,099	60.6	
Conservative	Henry Hawkes	3,311	39.4	
Majority		1,788	21.2	
Turnout		8,410	79.0	
Registered electors		10,643		
Liberal win (new seat)				

General election 1886: Birmingham South
Party	Candidate	Votes	%	±%
Liberal Unionist	Joseph Powell Williams	Unopposed		
Liberal Unionist gain from Liberal				

=== Elections in the 1890s ===
General election 1892: Birmingham South
Party	Candidate	Votes	%	±%
Liberal Unionist	Joseph Powell Williams	5,193	69.6	N/A
Liberal	William James Lancaster	2,270	30.4	New
Majority		2,923	39.2	N/A
Turnout		7,463	69.0	N/A
Registered electors		10,814		
Liberal Unionist hold		Swing	N/A	

General election 1895: Birmingham South
Party	Candidate	Votes	%	±%
Liberal Unionist	Joseph Powell Williams	4,830	79.3	+9.7
Liberal	Walter Priestman	1,257	20.7	−9.7
Majority		3,573	58.6	+19.4
Turnout		6,087	52.5	−16.5
Registered electors		11,604		
Liberal Unionist hold		Swing	+9.7	

=== Elections in the 1900s ===
General election 1900: Birmingham South
Party	Candidate	Votes	%	±%
Liberal Unionist	Joseph Powell Williams	Unopposed		
Liberal Unionist hold				

Morpeth

1904 Birmingham South by-election
Party	Candidate	Votes	%	±%
Liberal Unionist	Charles Howard	5,299	70.4	N/A
Liberal	James Hirst Hollowell	2,223	29.6	New
Majority		3,076	40.8	N/A
Turnout		7,522	62.8	N/A
Registered electors		11,984		
Liberal Unionist hold		Swing	N/A	

General election 1906: Birmingham South
Party	Candidate	Votes	%	±%
Liberal Unionist	Charles Howard	5,541	67.7	N/A
Lib-Lab	John Valentine Stevens	2,641	32.3	N/A
Majority		2,900	35.4	N/A
Turnout		8,182	70.5	N/A
Registered electors		11,611		
Liberal Unionist hold		Swing	N/A	

=== Elections in the 1910s ===
General election January 1910: Birmingham South
Party	Candidate	Votes	%	±%
Liberal Unionist	Charles Howard	6,207	71.5	+3.8
Liberal	Arnold Ernest Butler	2,476	28.5	−3.8
Majority		3,731	43.0	+7.6
Turnout		8,683	77.7	+7.2
Liberal Unionist hold		Swing	+3.8	

General election December 1910: Birmingham South
Party	Candidate	Votes	%	±%
Liberal Unionist	Charles Howard	4,701	71.0	−0.5
Liberal	Arnold Ernest Butler	1,923	29.0	+0.5
Majority		2,778	42.0	−1.0
Turnout		6,624	59.3	−18.4
Liberal Unionist hold		Swing	-0.5	

1911 Birmingham South by-election
Party	Candidate	Votes	%	±%
Liberal Unionist	Leo Amery	Unopposed		
Liberal Unionist hold				

General Election 1914–15:

Another General Election was required to take place before the end of 1915. The political parties had been making preparations for an election to take place and by July 1914, the following candidates had been selected;

- Unionist: Leo Amery
- Liberal: John Gibbard Hurst

== See also ==
- List of former United Kingdom Parliament constituencies
