= Jackson baronets of The Manor House (1869) =

Escutcheon of the Jackson baronets of The Manor House

The Jackson baronetcy, of The Manor House in Birkenhead, was created in the Baronetage of the United Kingdom on 4 November 1869 for William Jackson, Liberal Member of Parliament for Newcastle under Lyme and Derbyshire North. The 2nd Baronet briefly represented Coventry in Parliament.

The 3rd Baronet served as Lord-Lieutenant of Monmouthshire. In 1886, he assumed by Royal licence the additional surname of Mather.

== Jackson baronets, of The Manor House (1869) ==
- Sir William Jackson, 1st Baronet (1805–1876)
- Sir Henry Mather Jackson, 2nd Baronet (1831–1881)
- Sir Henry Mather Mather-Jackson, 3rd Baronet (1855–1942)
- Sir Edward Arthur Mather-Jackson, 4th Baronet (1899–1956)
- Sir George Christopher Mather Mather-Jackson, 5th Baronet (1896–1976)
- Sir Anthony Henry Mather Mather-Jackson, 6th Baronet (1899–1983)
- Sir William Mather-Jackson, 7th Baronet (1902–1985)
- Sir (William) Thomas Jackson, 8th Baronet (1927–2004)
- Sir (William) Roland Cedric Jackson, 9th Baronet (1954–2026)
- Sir Adam William Roland Jackson, 10th Baronet (born 1982).
