= Stephen Hepburn =

British Independent politician

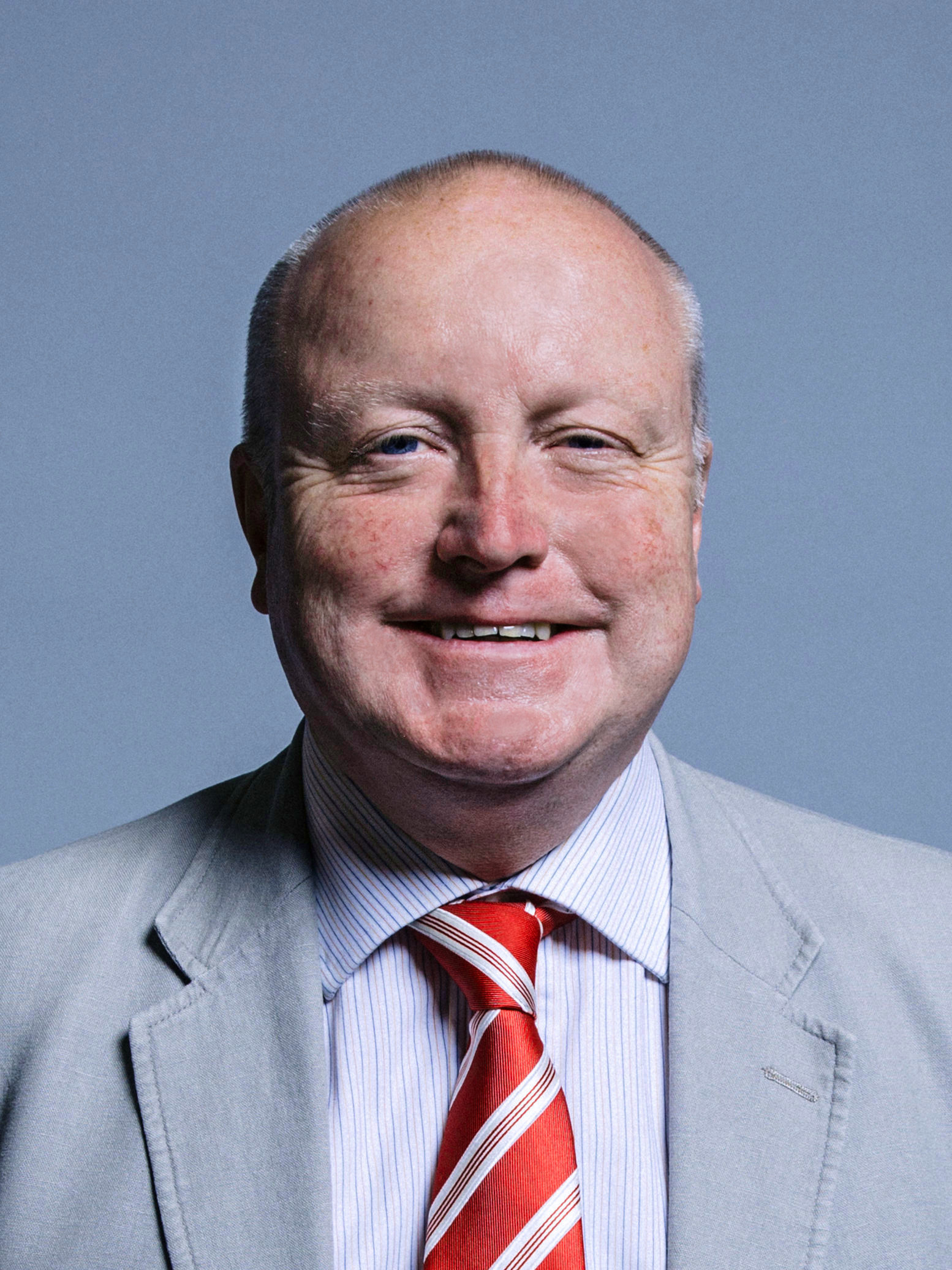
- Official portrait, 2017

Member of Parliament for Jarrow
- In office 1 May 1997 – 6 November 2019
- Preceded by: Donald Dixon
- Succeeded by: Kate Osborne

Personal details
- Born: 6 December 1959 (age 66) Jarrow, County Durham, England, UK
- Party: Independent (October 2019-present)
- Other political affiliations: Labour (until October 2019)
- Education: Newcastle University
- Website: stephenhepburn-mp.org.uk

Stephen Hepburn (born 6 December 1959) is a British politician, who was the Member of Parliament (MP) for Jarrow from 1997 to 2019. Hepburn was a member of the Labour Party until 7 October 2019, when he was suspended from the party following an accusation of sexual harassment. He then sat as an independent and was barred by the party from standing as a Labour candidate.

== Early life ==
Stephen Hepburn was born on 6 December 1959 to Peter and Margaret Hepburn in Jarrow, South Tyneside. He was educated at Springfield School, Jarrow (now Jarrow School) and the University of Newcastle upon Tyne where he studied politics. He worked as a personal assistant to Donald Dixon, his predecessor as MP for Jarrow.

== Early career ==
He was elected as a councillor to South Tyneside Borough Council in 1985, becoming the deputy leader for seven years in 1990, and he remained a councillor whilst serving as an MP. Hepburn served as the chairman of Tyne and Wear Pensions for eight years from 1989. In the 1990s, he was fined £75 for an assault on fellow councillor Iain Malcolm.

== Parliamentary career ==
He was elected to the British House of Commons for Jarrow following Dixon's retirement at the 1997 general election. Hepburn won the seat with a majority of 21,933. He made his maiden speech on 21 May 1997, in which he mentioned Ellen Wilkinson and the 1936 Jarrow March.

He served on both the administration and the defence select committees for four years from 1997. He was on the Accommodation and Works Committee from 2003 until the 2005 general election, following which he served on the Northern Ireland select committee. He also served as chairman of the All Party Parliamentary Group (APPG) on shipbuilding and ship repair, and was secretary of the APPG on football.

In 2003, Hepburn was one of three Labour MPs to vote against repealing Section 28, along with Joe Benton and David Crausby. Unlike Benton and Crausby, however, Hepburn voted in favour of the Marriage (Same Sex Couples) Act 2013, legalising same-sex marriage in England and Wales.

On 7 October 2019, Hepburn was suspended from the Labour Party pending an investigation into alleged sexual harassment of a female party member in 2005. He denied the allegation.

Parliament of the United Kingdom
Preceded by Don Dixon	Member of Parliament for Jarrow; 1997–2019	Succeeded by Kate Osborne
