= Robert John Wilson =

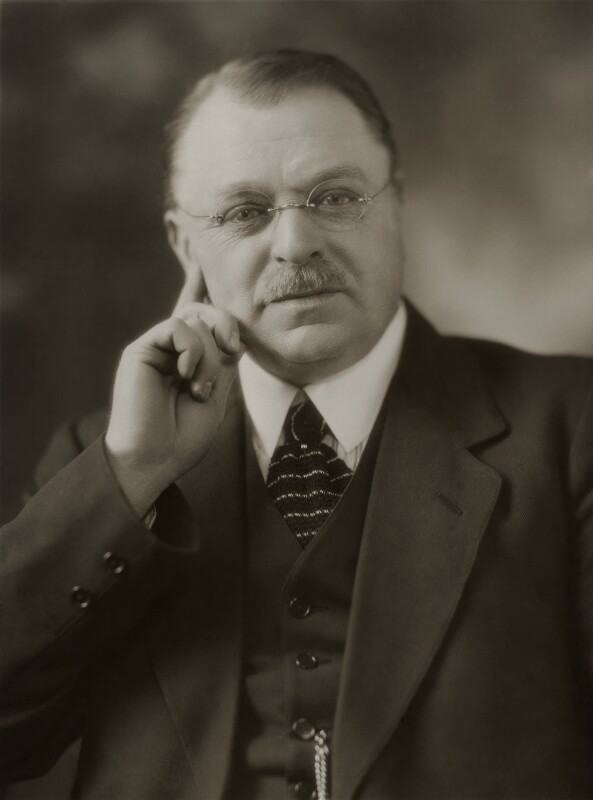
Wilson in 1924

Robert John Wilson (14 July 1865 – 5 November 1946) was Labour MP for Jarrow.

Born in Gateshead, Wilson was privately educated before becoming the manager of a drapers' shop. He joined the Labour Party and was elected to Sunderland Borough Council in 1907. He stood in Newcastle-upon-Tyne North at the 1918 general election, but was defeated. However, he won the seat of Jarrow at the 1922 general election, standing down from the council after his win. From 1924, he served as Parliamentary Private Secretary to William Leach. He lost his seat to the Conservatives at the 1931 general election.

Parliament of the United Kingdom
Preceded by Godfrey Palmer	Member of Parliament for Jarrow; 1922–1931	Succeeded by William Pearson
