= Ernest Fernyhough =

British politician (1908–1993)

The Right Honourable Ernest Fernyhough

Parliamentary Private Secretary to the Prime Minister
- In office 1964–1967
- Leader: Harold Wilson

Member of Parliament for Jarrow
- In office 7 May 1947 – 7 April 1979
- Preceded by: Ellen Wilkinson
- Succeeded by: Don Dixon

Personal details
- Born: 24 December 1908 Wood Lane, Staffordshire
- Died: 16 August 1993 (aged 84) Chester, Cheshire
- Party: Labour
- Spouse: Ethel Edwards (m. 1934; died 1977)
- Children: 3

Ernest Fernyhough (24 December 1908 – 16 August 1993) was a British Labour Party politician who served as a Member of Parliament (MP) for 32 years.

== Political career ==
Fernyhough worked for the National Union of Distributive and Allied Workers from 1936 to 1947.

In 1947, Fernyhough was elected Member of Parliament for the Labour stronghold of Jarrow in a by-election caused by the death of Ellen Wilkinson - and held the seat until he retired in 1979.

Fernyhough was Parliamentary Private Secretary to Prime Minister Harold Wilson from 1964 and a junior minister for Employment and Productivity from 1967 to 1969. He was also a member of the Council of Europe from 1970 to 1973.

== Personal life ==
In 1934, Fernyhough married Ethel Edwards, and the couple had two sons and a daughter. The oldest John Fernyhough died in June 2020 aged 82 and the youngest Margaret is still alive.

Ernest had 2 older brothers and four sisters

Parliament of the United Kingdom
Preceded by Ellen Wilkinson	Member of Parliament for Jarrow; 1947 – 1979	Succeeded by Don Dixon
