= Don Dixon, Baron Dixon =

British politician (1929–2017)

Baron Dixon PC, DL
- Dixon in 2011

Opposition Deputy Chief Whip of the House of Commons
- In office 16 July 1987 – 19 October 1995
- Leader: Neil Kinnock; John Smith; Margaret Beckett; Tony Blair
- Preceded by: Norman Hogg
- Succeeded by: Nick Brown

Member of the House of Lords
- Lord Temporal
- Life peerage 9 June 1997 – 9 February 2016

Member of Parliament for Jarrow
- In office 3 May 1979 – 8 April 1997
- Preceded by: Ernest Fernyhough
- Succeeded by: Stephen Hepburn

Personal details
- Born: 6 March 1929
- Died: 19 February 2017 (aged 87)
- Party: Labour
- Spouse: Doreen Morad
- Children: 2
- Parent: Albert Dixon (father)
- Education: Ellison Street Elementary School

Donald Dixon, Baron Dixon, PC, DL (6 March 1929 – 19 February 2017) was a British Labour Party politician.

== Early life ==
Dixon worked in the Tyne shipyards and was a workers' representative before being elected.

== Political career ==
Between 1963 and 1974, Dixon was leader of Jarrow Borough Council; after that council's abolition he spent five years as chairman of housing at South Tyneside.

He was Member of Parliament (MP) for Jarrow from 1979 until his retirement in 1997, serving as a party whip, and considered on the Old Right of the Party. He was subsequently elevated to the House of Lords as a life peer with the title Baron Dixon of Jarrow in the county of Tyne and Wear. He retired from the House of Lords on 9 February 2016.

== Arms ==
Coat of arms of Don Dixon, Baron Dixon
Crest A sea-bee Or winged Proper. Escutcheon Gules between two flaunches voided Or three crosses flory in pale Argent. Supporters On either side a sea-dragon reguardant Argent gorged with a plain collar and supporting with the exterior foot a trident Or. Motto March With Dignity

== Sources ==
- "Times Guide to the House of Commons", Times Newspapers Limited, 1992 edition.
- Dod's Parliamentary Companion.

Parliament of the United Kingdom
Preceded by Ernest Fernyhough	Member of Parliament for Jarrow; 1979 – 1997	Succeeded by Stephen Hepburn
Party political offices
Preceded by Norman Hogg	Labour Deputy Chief Whip in the House of Commons; 1987–1995	Succeeded by Nick Brown
