= The Division Bell Mystery =

1932 book by Ellen Wilkinson

First edition (publ. Harrap)

The Division Bell Mystery is a 1932 political murder mystery by Labour Party MP Ellen Wilkinson. A financier is found shot in the House of Commons. A young parliamentary private secretary turns amateur sleuth becoming smitten by the dead man's gorgeous but enigmatic granddaughter.
