= Clash (novel) =

1929 novel by Ellen Wilkinson

First edition (publ. George G. Harrap & Co.)

Clash is a 1929 novel by the English socialist politician Ellen Wilkinson. It focuses on the clash between career and personal relationships, against the backdrop of the 1926 general strike. It was Wilkinson's first novel. It was republished by Trent Editions with a new introduction by Ian Haywood and Maroula Joannou in 1998. and is still in print. Ellen Wilkinson, the first woman Labour MP, is best remembered for leading a march of the unemployed from her constituency in Jarrow to London in 1936. Her first novel Clash is set a decade earlier, during the General Strike when Wilkinson was sent as an accredited representative of the TUC to tour the country drumming up support of the strikers. The novel is a work of romantic fiction. It is semi autobiographical and book bears all the hall marks of her first-hand experience of the strike including descriptions of the time she spent with the women in the Yorkshire coal fields during the lock-out of 1926 which followed the strike.
