= Jarrow (constituency) =

Parliamentary constituency in the United Kingdom, 1885-2024

- Former borough constituency for the House of Commons
- 2010–2024 boundary of Jarrow in Tyne and Wear

- Location of Tyne and Wear within England
- County: Tyne and Wear
- Electorate: 83,260 (2011)
- Major settlements: Jarrow and Boldon

1885–2024
- Seats: One
- Created from: South Durham
- Replaced by: Jarrow and Gateshead East; South Shields (minor part)

Jarrow was a constituency (Note: A borough constituency (for the purposes of election expenses and type of returning officer)) represented in the House of Commons of the UK Parliament from 2019 until its abolition for the 2024 general election by Kate Osborne of the Labour Party. (Note: As with all constituencies, the constituency elects one Member of Parliament (MP) by the first past the post system of election at least every five years.)

The seat was created in the Redistribution of Seats Act 1885. and abolished in the 2023 periodic review of Westminster constituencies. With moderate boundary changes the constituency was replaced by the new Jarrow and Gateshead East, to be first contested in the 2024 general election.

== Boundaries ==
=== 1885–1918 ===
- The Sessional Division of South Shields;
- the Municipal Boroughs of Jarrow and South Shields; and
- so much of the Parish of Heworth as is not included in the Municipal Borough of Gateshead.

NB included only non-resident freeholders in the parliamentary borough of South Shields.

The constituency was created for the 1885 general election by the Redistribution of Seats Act 1885 as one of eight new single-member divisions of the county of Durham, replacing the two 2-member seats of North Durham and South Durham. See map on Vision of Britain website.

=== 1918–1950 ===
- The Borough of Jarrow; and
- the Urban Districts of Felling and Hebburn.

Areas to the south and east transferred to the expanded constituencies of South Shields and Houghton-le-Spring (the Boldons).

=== 1950–1955 ===
- The Borough of Jarrow; and
- the Urban Districts of Boldon, Felling, and Hebburn.

Regained the Boldons from Houghton-le-Spring.

=== 1955–1983 ===
- The Borough of Jarrow; and
- the Urban Districts of Boldon and Hebburn.

Felling transferred to Gateshead East. Redesignated as a borough constituency.

=== 1983–1997 ===
- The Metropolitan Borough of South Tyneside wards of Bede, Biddick Hall, Boldon Colliery, Cleadon and East Boldon, Fellgate and Hedworth, Hebburn Quay, Hebburn South, Monkton, Primrose, and Whitburn and Marsden.

Minor changes to take account of ward boundaries of the newly formed metropolitan borough, including the transfer of Biddick Hall from South Shields.

=== 1997–2010 ===
- The Metropolitan Borough of South Tyneside wards of Bede, Boldon Colliery, Cleadon and East Boldon, Fellgate and Hedworth, Hebburn Quay, Hebburn South, Monkton, Primrose, and Whitburn and Marsden; and
- the Metropolitan Borough of Gateshead ward of Wrekendyke.

Biddick Hall returned to South Shields; Wrekendyke transferred from the abolished constituency of Gateshead East.

=== 2010–2024 ===
Map of boundaries 2010–2024
- The Metropolitan Borough of South Tyneside wards of Bede, Boldon Colliery, Cleadon and East Boldon, Fellgate and Hedworth, Hebburn North, Hebburn South, Monkton, and Primrose; and
- the Metropolitan Borough of Gateshead wards of Pelaw and Heworth, and Wardley and Leam Lane.

Boundary changes for the 2010 general election transferred the community of Whitburn into the neighbouring South Shields seat. Pelaw and Heworth transferred from the abolished constituency of Gateshead East and Washington West. (The Wrekendyke ward had been renamed Wardley and Leam Lane).

=== Abolition ===
As a result of 2023 periodic review of Westminster constituencies the consistency was abolished with new constituencies being contested in the 2024 general election. Jarrow constituency was split between modified South Shields and newly created Jarrow and Gateshead East the following way:

Wards	New constituency	Part of Jarrow, %
Pelaw and Heworth, Wardley and Leam Lane wards (Gateshead); Bede, Boldon Colliery, Fellgate and Hedworth, Hebburn North, Hebburn South, Monkton, Primrose (South Tyneside)	Jarrow and Gateshead East	90.5
Cleadon and East Boldon (South Tyneside)	South Shields	9.5

== Constituency profile ==
The constituency consisted of part of the metropolitan district of South Tyneside, including the settlements of Jarrow, Boldon, Cleadon and Hebburn, as well as two wards from the adjacent Metropolitan Borough of Gateshead, covering Pelaw and Wardley.

In 2005 The Guardian described Jarrow as:

'[A] former shipbuilding town south of Newcastle famous for its march against unemployment in the 1930s.'

== Political history ==
The last Liberal to serve the seat lost his seat at the 1922 general election and the last Conservative to serve the seat held it from 1931 to 1935, since which it has been served by MPs from the Labour Party.

Since 1935, just five people have served as MP for Jarrow; the first, Ellen Wilkinson, served as Labour's first Minister of Education during the first Attlee government. While the seat has been loyally Labour by comfortable margins since 1935, it has seen unusual swings a number of times; in the 1983 Conservative landslide, incumbent MP Don Dixon actually increased his majority; in the close 1992 election his majority fell somewhat despite the general swing to Labour; and in 2001 his successor Stephen Hepburn managed to increase his majority to 51.1% (incidentally the biggest any candidate has ever held in the seat).

== Members of Parliament ==
Election	Member	Party
1885	Charles Palmer	Liberal
1907 by-election	Pete Curran	Labour
Jan 1910	Godfrey Palmer	Liberal
1916	Godfrey Palmer	Coalition Liberal
Jan 1922	Godfrey Palmer	National Liberal
1922	Robert John Wilson	Labour
1931	William Pearson	Conservative
1935	Ellen Wilkinson	Labour
1947 by-election	Ernest Fernyhough	Labour
1979	Don Dixon	Labour
1997	Stephen Hepburn	Labour
2019	Stephen Hepburn	Independent
2019	Kate Osborne	Labour
2024	Constituency abolished	

== Election results 1885–2024 ==
=== Elections in the 1880s ===
Charles Palmer

General election 1885: Jarrow
Party	Candidate	Votes	%
Liberal	Charles Palmer	5,702	76.6
Jarrow Radical and Labour Representation League	James Johnston	1,731	23.3
Majority		3,971	53.3
Turnout		7,433	57.6
Registered electors		12,897	
Liberal win (new seat)			

General election 1886: Jarrow
Party	Candidate	Votes	%	±%
Liberal	Charles Palmer	Unopposed		
Liberal hold				

=== Elections in the 1890s ===
General election 1892: Jarrow
Party	Candidate	Votes	%	±%
Liberal	Charles Palmer	7,343	75.2	N/A
Independent Labour	Edward Dillon Lewis	2,416	24.8	New
Majority		4,927	50.4	N/A
Turnout		9,759	68.6	N/A
Registered electors		14,231		
Liberal hold		Swing	N/A	

General election 1895: Jarrow
Party	Candidate	Votes	%	±%
Liberal	Charles Palmer	Unopposed		
Liberal hold				

=== Elections in the 1900s ===
General election 1900: Jarrow
Party	Candidate	Votes	%	±%
Liberal	Charles Palmer	Unopposed		
Liberal hold				

General election 1906: Jarrow
Party	Candidate	Votes	%	±%
Liberal	Charles Palmer	8,047	61.2	N/A
Labour Repr. Cmte.	Pete Curran	5,093	38.8	New
Majority		2,954	22.4	N/A
Turnout		13,140	77.2	N/A
Registered electors		17,023		
Liberal hold		Swing	N/A	

1907 Jarrow by-election
Party	Candidate	Votes	%	±%
Labour	Pete Curran	4,698	33.1	−5.7
Conservative	Patrick Rose-Innes	3,930	27.6	New
Liberal	Spencer Leigh Hughes	3,474	24.4	−36.8
Irish Parliamentary	John O'Hanlon	2,122	14.9	New
Majority		768	5.5	N/A
Turnout		14,224	82.7	+5.5
Registered electors		17,195		
Labour gain from Liberal		Swing	+15.6	

=== Elections in the 1910s ===
General election January 1910: Jarrow
Party	Candidate	Votes	%	±%
Liberal	Godfrey Palmer	4,885	34.0	−27.2
Labour	Pete Curran	4,818	33.5	−5.3
Conservative	James Kirkley	4,668	32.5	N/A
Majority		67	0.5	−21.9
Turnout		14,371	78.6	+1.4
Registered electors		18,292		
Liberal hold		Swing	−11.0	

General election December 1910: Jarrow
Party	Candidate	Votes	%	±%
Liberal	Godfrey Palmer	5,097	34.0	±0.0
Conservative	James Kirkley	4,986	33.3	+0.8
Labour	Alexander Gordon Cameron	4,892	32.7	−0.8
Majority		111	0.7	+0.2
Turnout		14,975	81.9	+3.3
Registered electors		18,292		
Liberal hold		Swing	+0.1	

General election 1918: Jarrow
Party		Candidate	Votes	%
C	National Liberal	Godfrey Palmer	12,544	61.0
	Labour	John Hill	8,034	39.0
Majority			4,510	22.0
Turnout			20,578	55.0
Registered electors			37,389	
	National Liberal win (new boundaries)			
C indicates candidate endorsed by the coalition government.

=== Elections in the 1920s ===
General election 1922: Jarrow
Party	Candidate	Votes	%	±%
Labour	Robert Wilson	17,208	53.9	+14.9
Unionist	Charles Harrie Innes-Hopkins	10,166	31.9	New
Liberal	Ernest Young	4,522	14.2	New
Majority		7,042	22.0	N/A
Turnout		31,896	82.2	+27.2
Registered electors		38,808		
Labour gain from National Liberal		Swing	+30.9	

General election 1923: Jarrow
Party	Candidate	Votes	%	±%
Labour	Robert John Wilson	16,570	63.9	+10.0
Unionist	John Lindsley	9,348	36.1	+4.2
Majority		7,222	27.8	+5.8
Turnout		25,918	67.2	−15.0
Registered electors		38,548		
Labour hold		Swing	+2.9	

General election 1924: Jarrow
Party	Candidate	Votes	%	±%
Labour	Robert Wilson	18,203	57.4	−6.5
Unionist	Albert Baucher	13,527	42.6	+6.5
Majority		4,676	14.8	−13.0
Turnout		31,730	80.9	+13.7
Registered electors		39,237		
Labour hold		Swing	−6.5	

General election 1929: Jarrow
Party	Candidate	Votes	%	±%
Labour	Robert Wilson	22,751	62.5	+5.1
Unionist	Longinus Vivian Rogers	13,638	37.5	−5.1
Majority		9,113	25.0	+10.2
Turnout		36,389	75.3	−5.6
Registered electors		48,313		
Labour hold		Swing	+5.1	

=== Elections in the 1930s ===
General election 1931: Jarrow
Party	Candidate	Votes	%	±%
Conservative	William Pearson	21,263	54.1	+16.6
Labour	Robert Wilson	18,071	45.9	−16.6
Majority		3,192	8.2	N/A
Turnout		39,334	80.5	+5.2
Registered electors				
Conservative gain from Labour		Swing		

General election 1935: Jarrow
Party	Candidate	Votes	%	±%
Labour	Ellen Wilkinson	20,324	53.1	+7.2
Conservative	William Pearson	17,974	46.9	−7.2
Majority		2,350	6.2	N/A
Turnout		38,298	80.8	+0.3
Registered electors				
Labour gain from Conservative		Swing		

=== Elections in the 1940s ===
General election 1945: Jarrow
Party	Candidate	Votes	%	±%
Labour	Ellen Wilkinson	22,656	66.0	+12.9
National Liberal	Stanley Holmes	11,649	34.0	−12.9
Majority		11,007	32.1	+25.9
Turnout		34,305	82.4	+1.6
Registered electors				
Labour hold		Swing		

1947 Jarrow by-election
Party	Candidate	Votes	%	±%
Labour	Ernest Fernyhough	20,694	59.3	−6.7
Conservative	William Scott	13,078	37.5	+3.5
Ind. Labour Party	W. Moody	1,114	3.2	New
Majority		7,616	21.8	−10.3
Turnout		34,886		
Registered electors				
Labour hold		Swing	N/A	

=== Elections in the 1950s ===
General election 1950: Jarrow
Party	Candidate	Votes	%
Labour	Ernest Fernyhough	33,751	63.0
Conservative	John L. Cox	16,895	31.5
Liberal	Edward Chalkley	2,940	5.5
Majority		16,856	31.5
Turnout		53,586	82.8
Registered electors			
Labour win (new boundaries)			

General election 1951: Jarrow
Party	Candidate	Votes	%	±%
Labour	Ernest Fernyhough	35,963	66.2	+3.2
Conservative	John Cox	19,217	34.8	+3.3
Majority		16,746	30.4	−1.1
Turnout		55,180	84.6	+1.8
Registered electors				
Labour hold		Swing		

General election 1955: Jarrow
Party	Candidate	Votes	%
Labour	Ernest Fernyhough	24,706	63.3
Conservative	Marjorie Dickinson	14,304	36.4
Majority		10,402	26.9
Turnout		39,010	79.1
Registered electors			
Labour win (new boundaries)			

General election 1959: Jarrow
Party	Candidate	Votes	%	±%
Labour	Ernest Fernyhough	25,638	62.7	−0.6
Conservative	Tommy T Hubble	15,286	37.4	+1.0
Majority		10,352	25.3	−1.6
Turnout		40,924	80.3	+1.2
Registered electors				
Labour hold		Swing		

=== Elections in the 1960s ===
General election 1964: Jarrow
Party	Candidate	Votes	%	±%
Labour	Ernest Fernyhough	26,053	64.2	+1.5
Conservative	Tommy T Hubble	14,503	35.8	−1.6
Majority		11,550	28.4	+3.1
Turnout		40,556	80.0	−0.3
Registered electors				
Labour hold		Swing		

General election 1966: Jarrow
Party	Candidate	Votes	%	±%
Labour	Ernest Fernyhough	26,006	67.6	+3.4
Conservative	Derrick Robson	12,449	32.4	−3.4
Majority		13,557	35.2	+6.8
Turnout		38,455	76.7	−3.3
Registered electors				
Labour hold		Swing		

=== Elections in the 1970s ===
General election 1970: Jarrow
Party	Candidate	Votes	%	±%
Labour	Ernest Fernyhough	25,861	63.5	−4.1
Conservative	Derrick Robson	14,847	36.5	+4.1
Majority		11,014	27.0	−8.2
Turnout		40,708	74.4	−2.3
Registered electors				
Labour hold		Swing		

General election February 1974: Jarrow
Party	Candidate	Votes	%	±%
Labour	Ernest Fernyhough	27,740	66.7	+3.2
Conservative	B. Bolam	13,848	33.3	−3.2
Majority		13,892	33.4	+6.4
Turnout		41,588	86.8	+12.4
Labour hold		Swing		

General election October 1974: Jarrow
Party	Candidate	Votes	%	±%
Labour	Ernest Fernyhough	24,558	62.8	−3.9
Conservative	B. Bolam	8,707	22.3	−10.0
Liberal	L. Ormston	5,818	14.9	New
Majority		15,851	40.5	+7.1
Turnout		39,083	71.4	−15.4
Labour hold		Swing		

General election 1979: Jarrow
Party	Candidate	Votes	%	±%
Labour	Don Dixon	24,057	55.8	−7.0
Conservative	D. Auld	12,529	29.1	+6.8
Liberal	A. McDonnell	3,907	9.1	−5.8
Independent Labour	H. Downey	2,247	5.2	New
Independent	N. Brown	374	0.9	New
Majority		11,528	26.7	−13.8
Turnout		43,114	77.5	+6.1
Labour hold		Swing		

=== Elections in the 1980s ===
General election 1983: Jarrow
Party	Candidate	Votes	%	±%
Labour	Don Dixon	25,151	55.3	−0.5
Conservative	Sonia Copland	11,274	24.8	−4.3
Liberal	John A. Lennox	9,094	20.0	+10.9
Majority		13,877	30.5	+3.8
Turnout		45,519	71.4	−6.1
Labour hold		Swing		

General election 1987: Jarrow
Party	Candidate	Votes	%	±%
Labour	Don Dixon	29,651	63.4	+7.9
Conservative	Paul Yeoman	10,856	23.2	−1.6
Liberal	Peter Freitag	6,230	13.3	−6.7
Majority		18,795	40.2	+9.7
Turnout		46,737	74.4	+3.0
Labour hold		Swing		

=== Elections in the 1990s ===
General election 1992: Jarrow
Party	Candidate	Votes	%	±%
Labour	Don Dixon	28,956	62.1	−1.3
Conservative	Terence F. Ward	11,049	23.7	+0.5
Liberal Democrats	Keith Orrell	6,608	14.2	+0.9
Majority		17,907	38.4	−1.8
Turnout		46,613	74.4	0.0
Labour hold		Swing	−0.9	

General election 1997: Jarrow
Party	Candidate	Votes	%	±%
Labour	Stephen Hepburn	28,497	64.9	+2.8
Conservative	Mark C. Allatt	6,564	14.9	−8.8
Liberal Democrats	Tim N. Stone	4,865	11.1	−3.1
Independent Labour	Alan J. Le Blond	2,538	5.8	New
Referendum	Peter W. Mailer	1,034	2.4	New
Socialist (GB)	John Bissett	444	1.0	New
Majority		21,933	50.0	+11.6
Turnout		43,942	68.7	−5.7
Labour hold		Swing		

=== Elections in the 2000s ===
General election 2001: Jarrow
Party	Candidate	Votes	%	±%
Labour	Stephen Hepburn	22,777	66.1	+1.2
Liberal Democrats	James Selby	5,182	15.0	+3.9
Conservative	Donald Wood	5,056	14.7	−0.2
UKIP	Alan Badger	716	2.1	New
Independent	Alan J. Le Blond	391	1.1	New
Socialist (GB)	John Bissett	357	1.0	±0.0
Majority		17,595	51.1	+1.1
Turnout		34,479	55.1	−13.6
Labour hold		Swing		

General election 2005: Jarrow
Party	Candidate	Votes	%	±%
Labour	Stephen Hepburn	20,554	60.5	−5.6
Liberal Democrats	Bill Schardt	6,650	19.6	+4.6
Conservative	Linkson A.S. Jack	4,807	14.1	−0.6
UKIP	Alan Badger	1,567	4.6	+2.5
Safeguard the National Health Service	Roger Nettleship	400	1.2	New
Majority		13,904	40.9	−10.2
Turnout		33,978	55.0	−0.1
Labour hold		Swing	−5.1	

=== Elections in the 2010s ===
General election 2010: Jarrow
Party	Candidate	Votes	%	±%
Labour	Stephen Hepburn	20,910	53.9	−4.9
Conservative	Jeff Milburn	8,002	20.6	+7.8
Liberal Democrats	Tom Appleby	7,163	18.5	−4.0
BNP	Andy Swaddle	2,709	7.0	New
Majority		12,908	33.3	
Turnout		38,784	60.3	+5.5
Labour hold		Swing	−6.4	

General election 2015: Jarrow
Party	Candidate	Votes	%	±%
Labour	Stephen Hepburn	21,464	55.7	+1.8
UKIP	Steve Harrison	7,583	19.7	New
Conservative	Nick Mason	6,584	17.1	−3.5
Green	David Herbert	1,310	3.4	New
Liberal Democrats	Stan Collins	1,238	3.2	−15.3
TUSC	Norman Hall	385	1.0	New
Majority		13,881	36.0	+2.7
Turnout		38,564	60.4	+0.1
Labour hold		Swing	−9.0	

General election 2017: Jarrow
Party	Candidate	Votes	%	±%
Labour	Stephen Hepburn	28,020	65.1	+9.4
Conservative	Robin Gwynn	10,757	25.0	+7.9
UKIP	James Askwith	2,338	5.4	−14.3
Liberal Democrats	Peter Maughan	1,163	2.7	−0.5
Green	David Herbert	745	1.7	−1.7
Majority		17,263	40.1	+4.1
Turnout		43,023	66.4	+6.0
Labour hold		Swing	+0.8	

General election 2019: Jarrow
Party	Candidate	Votes	%	±%
Labour	Kate Osborne	18,363	45.1	−20.0
Conservative	Nick Oliver	11,243	27.6	+2.6
Brexit Party	Richard Monaghan	4,122	10.1	+10.1
Independent	John Robertson	2,991	7.3	+7.3
Liberal Democrats	David Wilkinson	2,360	5.8	+3.1
Green	James Milne	831	2.0	+0.3
Independent	Shaun Sadler	614	1.5	+1.5
SDP	Mark Conway	212	0.5	+0.5
Majority		7,120	17.5	−22.6
Turnout		40,736	62.6	−3.8
Labour hold		Swing	−11.3	

This was the only seat in England at the 2019 general election where five candidates saved their deposit by securing over 5% of the vote.

== See also ==
- List of parliamentary constituencies in Tyne and Wear
- History of parliamentary constituencies and boundaries in Tyne and Wear
- History of parliamentary constituencies and boundaries in Durham
