= 1947 Jarrow by-election =

UK Parliamentary by-election

The 1947 Jarrow by-election was held on 7 May 1947. The byelection was held due to the death of the incumbent Labour MP, Ellen Wilkinson. It was won by the Labour candidate Ernest Fernyhough.

Jarrow by-election, 1947
| Party | Candidate | Votes | % | ±% |
|---|---|---|---|---|
| Labour | Ernest Fernyhough | 20,694 | 59.3 | −6.7 |
| Conservative | William Scott | 13,078 | 37.5 | New |
| Independent Labour | W. Moody | 1,114 | 3.2 | New |
| Majority | | 7,616 | 21.8 | −10.3 |
| Turnout | | 34,886 | | |
| Labour hold | | Swing | N/A | |
