= Godfrey Palmer (politician) =

British politician (1878–1933)

Godfrey Mark Palmer (4 August 1878 – 12 June 1933) was an English industrialist and Liberal Party politician.

== Family and education ==
Godfrey Palmer was the youngest son of Sir Charles Mark Palmer Bt, of Grinkle Park, near Loftus in the-then North Riding of Yorkshire – the founder of the Palmer Shipbuilding Co of Jarrow. His mother, Charles' third wife Lady Gertrude Palmer, was the daughter of James Montgomrey of Brentford, Middlesex. Godfrey attended Eton College in 1892 and left in 1896 to continue his studies in Paris.

In 1906, he married Elma, daughter of Mr. Alexander Geddes of Blairmore in Aberdeenshire. They had a son and two daughters.

== Career ==
As the scion of a famous business family in North East England, Palmer took an interest in shipping and the large industrial works on the Tyneside. By the time of his death, he had become Chairman of Marley Hill Chemical Company and managing director of John Bowes and Partners, colliery owners, in both of which concerns his half-brother, Sir Alfred Molyneux Palmer, who had inherited the Palmer baronetcy; was a director. Godfrey was also chairman of Chislet Colliery Ltd and had other business interests in London. He travelled widely on business trips, visiting the Far East, India, Australasia, and the Americas.

Palmer also served in the Territorial Force. He achieved the rank of Major in the Yorkshire Regiment.

== Politics ==
It was no surprise that Palmer followed his father into Liberal politics as he had followed him into business and industry. Sir Charles Palmer had been MP for North Durham from 1874 until 1885 when the seat was abolished. He then transferred to the constituency of Jarrow which he held from 1885 until his death in 1907.

Sir Charles Palmer's death caused a by-election in Jarrow and the local Liberal Association adopted Mr Spencer Leigh Hughes, a London-based journalist and later MP for Stockport as their candidate. In that contest the Liberal vote was split by the candidacy of an Irish Nationalist and Hughes lost the election to Labour. Jarrow Liberals therefore had cause to look for another candidate and in 1909, Godfrey Palmer was unanimously invited to be the Liberal candidate at the next election.

Palmer was regarded as a strong candidate for the Liberals in Jarrow, given the family name and local connections and was expected in some quarters to win the seat back from Labour while other commentators felt the Unionists had a better chance of beating Labour there. In the event this conflict of opinion was reflected in the result which revealed Jarrow as a very close three-way marginal. Palmer gained the seat from the sitting Labour MP, Pete Curran, by the narrow majority of 67 votes, with the Conservative Mr J Kirkley just 217 votes behind the winner.

General election of January 1910: Jarrow
Party	Candidate	Votes	%	±%
Liberal	Godfrey Palmer	4,885		–
Labour	Pete Curran	4,818		
Conservative	James Kirkley	4,668		
Majority		67		
Liberal gain from Labour		Swing	{{{swing}}}	

At the second general election of the year in December 1910, Palmer held his seat, again in a three-way fight, this time with a majority of 111 but on this occasion it was Kirkley for the Unionists who crept into second place ahead of a new Labour candidate.

By the time of the 1918 general election, Palmer had aligned himself with the Lloyd George Coalition Liberals. He was not opposed by the Conservatives and presumably received the Coalition coupon. In a straight fight against Labour's John Hill, Palmer got 61% of the poll and a majority of 4,510 votes. He chose not to contest the 1922 general election and did not stand for Parliament again.

== Appointments ==
From 1917 to 1920 he was Parliamentary Private Secretary for Sir Eric Geddes when Geddes served as First Lord of the Admiralty. He stayed on as Geddes' PPS when Geddes became Minister without Portfolio and then Minister of Transport. Palmer also sat as a Justice of the Peace for the North Riding of Yorkshire.

== Death ==
Palmer died suddenly in Paris on Monday 12 June 1933, at the age of 54.

== Papers ==
The papers of Sir Charles Mark Palmer, Godfrey Mark Palmer and others from c1858 to the 20th century are contained in the Palmer family papers held at the North Yorkshire County Record Office.

Parliament of the United Kingdom
Preceded by Peter Francis Curran	Member of Parliament for Jarrow; January 1910 – 1922	Succeeded by Robert John Wilson
