= William Pearson (British politician) =

William George Pearson (1882 – 4 October 1963) was a British politician, Conservative MP for Jarrow (UK Parliament constituency).

He was Mayor of Jarrow from 1928 to 1930.

Pearson contested the parliamentary seat of Houghton-le-Spring in 1929. He was elected in the National Government landslide of 1931 for Jarrow, but narrowly lost his seat to Ellen Wilkinson in the limited Labour recovery of 1935.
