= 2017 Northumberland County Council election =

2017 UK local government election

← 2013	4 May 2017	2021 →

All 67 seats to Northumberland County Council 34 seats needed for a majority
- Turnout: 40.5%
	First party	Second party
Party	Conservative	Labour
Last election	21	32
Seats won	33	24
Seat change	▲12	▼12
Popular vote	43,101	26,483
Percentage	43.9%	27.0%
	Third party	Fourth party
Party	Independent	Liberal Democrats
Last election	3	11
Seats won	7	3
Seat change	▲4	▼8
Popular vote	11,729	11,693
Percentage	11.9%	11.9%
- Map of the results of the 2017 local election.
Control of Council before election
No overall control
Control of Council after election
No overall control

An election for the Northumberland County Council took place on 4 May 2017 as part of the 2017 local elections in the United Kingdom. All 67 councillors were elected from 66 electoral divisions which returned either one or two county councillors each by first-past-the-post voting for a four-year term of office.

The results saw the Conservative Party win 33 seats, one short of a majority. In South Blyth there was a tie between the Conservatives and the Liberal Democrats who decided the results by drawing straws, which the Liberal Democrats won; had the tie gone the other way the Conservatives would have won a majority. The Conservatives made significant gains in medium-sized towns, gaining seats in Prudhoe, Berwick-upon-Tweed, Alnwick, Morpeth and Cramlington.

== Result ==
Northumberland County Council Election Result 2017
Party	Seats	Gains	Losses	Net gain/loss	Seats %	Votes %	Votes	+/−
Conservative	33	14	1	+12	49.25	44.05	44,387	+13.31
Labour	24	0	9	-8	35.82	26.87	27,077	-8.20
Liberal Democrats	3	0	8	-8	7.46	12.06	12,150	-9.09
Independent	5			0	4.48	9.90	9,978	+4.15
No description	2	2	0	+2	2.99	1.74	1,751	New
UKIP	0			0	0.00	3.18	3,202	-3.61
Green	0			0	0.00	2.20	2,220	+1.70

There was a total of 100,765 valid votes cast, and a total of 354 ballots were rejected.

== Council Composition ==
Following the previous election in 2013, the composition of the council was:

↓
32	21	11	3
Labour	Conservative	Liberal Democrat	Independent

After the election, the composition of the council was:

↓
33	24	3	4	3
Conservative	Labour	Liberal Democrat	Non Aligned	Bedlington Independent

== Ward results ==
Asterisks denote incumbent Councillors seeking re-election. Councillors seeking re-election were elected in 2013, and results are compared to that year's polls on that basis. All results are listed below:

=== Alnwick ===
Alnwick (2 seats)
Party	Candidate	Votes	%	±%
Conservative	Gordon Castle*	1,929	30.38	+10.35
Conservative	Robbie Moore	1,295	20.39	+6.77
Liberal Democrats	Lydia Heather Cairns*	959	15.10	−2.80
Labour	James Matthewson	688	10.83	+6.18
Labour	Bill Grisdale	594	9.35	+1.16
Liberal Democrats	Andrew Eoin Duff	457	7.20	−9.30
UKIP	Michael John Weatheritt	241	3.80	−6.75
UKIP	Margaret Weatheritt	187	2.95	−5.61
Majority		336	5.29	+3.89
Turnout		6,350		
Conservative hold		Swing		
Conservative gain from Liberal Democrats		Swing		

=== Amble ===
Amble (1 seat)
Party	Candidate	Votes	%	±%
Labour	Terry Clark	622	51.36	−18.51
Conservative	June Elaine Watson	452	37.33	+17.65
Liberal Democrats	Roger Cashmore	137	11.31	0.86
Majority		170	14.03	−36.16
Turnout		1,211		
Labour hold		Swing		

=== Amble West with Warkworth ===
Amble West with Warkworth (1 seat)
Party	Candidate	Votes	%	±%
Conservative	Jeff Watson*	743	47.32	+19.59
Independent	Dorothy Ann Burke	376	23.95	9.70
Liberal Democrats	Andrew Alexander James Findlay	264	16.82	−10.84
Labour	Nicola Morrison	187	11.91	−1.76
Majority		367	23.37	+23.30
Turnout		1,570		
Conservative hold		Swing		

=== Ashington Central ===
Ashington Central (1 seat)
Party	Candidate	Votes	%	±%
Labour	Thomas Sinclair Wilson*	740	79.57	−10.77
Conservative	Niran Pulle-Daley	190	20.43	+10.77
Majority		550	59.14	−21.54
Turnout		930		
Labour hold		Swing		

=== Bamburgh ===
Bamburgh (1 seat)
Party	Candidate	Votes	%	±%
Conservative	Guy Renner-Thompson	1,294	71.45	+14.60
Labour	David Graham Paul	387	21.37	+10.60
Liberal Democrats	Celyn Jean Emlyn Ashworth	130	7.18	−25.20
Majority		907	50.08	+25.61
Turnout		1,811		
Conservative hold		Swing		

=== Bedlington Central ===
Bedlington Central (1 seat)
Party	Candidate	Votes	%	±%
Independent	Russ Wallace	927	60.66	
Labour	Alyson Wallace*	356	23.30	−34.25
Conservative	Ruben Ainesh Pulle-Daley	132	8.64	−11.59
Independent	David Graham	113	7.40	
Majority		571	37.36	+2.03
Turnout		1,528		
Independent gain from Labour		Swing		

=== Bedlington East ===
Bedlington East (1 seat)
Party	Candidate	Votes	%	±%
Independent	Bill Crosby	544	51.08	
Labour	Val Tyler*	409	46.88	
Conservative	Johnny Wearmouth	112	1.52	
Majority		135	12.68	−63.60
Turnout		1,065		
Independent gain from Labour		Swing		

=== Bedlington West ===
Bedlington West (1 seat)
Party	Candidate	Votes	%	±%
No description	Malcolm Robinson	568	37.37	+12.02
Labour	Terry Johnstone*	503	33.09	−13.90
Conservative	Tracy Aynsley	260	17.11	+2.39
Independent	Adam Hogg	189	12.43	
Majority		65	4.28	−17.36
Turnout		1,520		
No description gain from Labour				

=== Bellingham ===
Bellingham (1 seat)
Party	Candidate	Votes	%	±%
Conservative	John Robert Riddle	998	67.12	−1.91
Green	Michael James Macgregor	349	23.47	
Labour	Phil Bowyer	140	9.41	−8.74
Majority		649	43.65	−7.23
Turnout		1,487		
Conservative hold		Swing		

=== Berwick East ===
Berwick East (1 seat)
Party	Candidate	Votes	%	±%
Independent	Georgina Emma Rowley Hill	363	33.15	
Conservative	Hayley Jayne Nichols	309	28.22	−5.20
Liberal Democrats	Margaret Anne McKinnon	182	16.62	−28.56
Independent	Paul Joseph Hodgson	144	13.15	
Green	Thomas Leslie Stewart	97	8.86	
Majority		54	4.93	−6.83
Turnout		1,095		
Independent gain from Liberal Democrats		Swing		

=== Berwick North ===
Berwick North (1 seat)
Party	Candidate	Votes	%	±%
Conservative	Catherine Morag Seymour	424	28.67	+3.15
Independent	Jim Herbert	420	28.40	
Liberal Democrats	Gavin William Jones*	264	17.85	−18.75
Independent	Shirley Anne Forbes	161	10.88	
Independent	Brian Alexander Douglas	154	10.41	−18.88
Labour	Mick McCarthy	56	3.79	−4.80
Majority		4	0.27	−7.04
Turnout		1,479		
Conservative gain from Liberal Democrats		Swing		

=== Berwick West with Ord ===
Berwick West with Ord (1 seat)
Party	Candidate	Votes	%	±%
Conservative	Gregah Alan Roughead	528	47.96	+17.32
Liberal Democrats	Elizabeth Isabel Hunter*	491	44.59	−13.17
Labour	Patricia Williams	82	7.45	−4.15
Majority		37	3.37	−23.75
Turnout		1,101		
Conservative gain from Liberal Democrats		Swing		

=== Bothal ===
Bothal (1 seat)
Party	Candidate	Votes	%	±%
Labour	Lynne Grimshaw*	704	56.32	+1.95
Liberal Democrats	Andy McGregor	398	31.84	−7.26
Conservative	Joao Bruno Parreira	148	11.84	+5.31
Majority		306	24.48	+9.21
Turnout		1,250		
Labour hold		Swing		

=== Bywell ===
Bywell (1 seat)
Party	Candidate	Votes	%	±%
Conservative	Karen Rachel Quinn	833	43.32	+14.06
Labour	James Bryan	615	31.98	+15.94
Liberal Democrats	Tom Appleby	387	20.12	+4.08
Green	Martin Davenport	88	4.58	
Majority		218	11.34	+1.94
Turnout		1,923		
Conservative gain from Independent		Swing		

=== Choppington ===
Choppington (1 seat)
Party	Candidate	Votes	%	±%
Labour	Dave Ledger*	455	38.04	−43.86
Independent	Stephen James Armstrong	336	28.09	
Conservative	Jack Alexander Gebhard	218	18.23	+0.13
Independent	Sarah Victoria Legge	187	15.64	
Majority		119	9.95	−53.85
Turnout		1,196		
Labour hold		Swing		

=== College ===
College (1 seat)
Party	Candidate	Votes	%	±%
Labour	Mark Andrew Purvis	784	78.87	−11.83
Conservative	Nicola Ann Bawn	210	21.13	+11.83
Majority		574	57.74	−23.66
Turnout		994		
Labour hold		Swing		

=== Corbridge ===
Corbridge (1 seat)
Party	Candidate	Votes	%	±%
Conservative	Nick Oliver	893	49.09	−11.97
Independent	Maurice Hodgson	765	42.06	
Labour	Keith Gordon Trobe	106	5.83	−18.97
Green	John Charles Stuart Oldham	55	3.02	
Majority		128	7.03	−29.23
Turnout		1,819		
Conservative hold		Swing		

=== Cowpen ===
Cowpen (1 seat)
Party	Candidate	Votes	%	±%
Labour	Susan Davey*	414	53.77	+1.61
UKIP	Brian Richard Erskine	180	23.38	−17.66
Conservative	Samantha Liddle	134	17.40	+13.95
Liberal Democrats	Alisdair Lindsey Gibbs-Barton	42	5.45	+2.10
Majority		234	30.39	+19.27
Turnout		770		
Labour hold		Swing		

=== Cramlington East ===
Cramlington East (1 seat)
Party	Candidate	Votes	%	±%
Labour	Ian Carr Fry Swithenbank*	424	51.15	−27.04
Conservative	Paul Forster Renynolds	305	36.79	+25.75
UKIP	Valerie Ellis	100	12.06	
Majority		119	14.36	−52.79
Turnout		829		
Labour hold		Swing		

=== Cramlington Eastfield ===
Cramlington Eastfield (1 seat)
Party	Candidate	Votes	%	±%
Conservative	Christine Lesley Dunbar	831	55.11	+35.71
Labour	Laura Pidcock	506	33.55	−15.49
Independent	Susan Mary Bryce Johnston	88	5.84	
Liberal Democrats	Lynda Ann McKenna	43	2.85	−28.71
UKIP	Melanie Hurst	40	2.65	
Majority		325	21.56	+4.08
Turnout		1,508		
Conservative gain from Labour		Swing		

=== Cramlington North ===
Cramlington North (1 seat)
Party	Candidate	Votes	%	±%
Conservative	Wayne Daley*	1,644	90.03	+11.44
Labour	David Luke Murray	182	9.97	−8.65
Majority		1,462	80.06	+20.09
Turnout		1,826		
Conservative hold		Swing		

=== Cramlington South East ===
Cramlington South East (1 seat)
Party	Candidate	Votes	%	±%
Labour	Allan Hepple*	718	43.57	−3.69
Conservative	Paul D Ezhilchelvan	567	34.40	+18.60
Liberal Democrats	Tom Brechany	276	16.75	−1.08
UKIP	Christopher Halliday	87	5.28	
Majority		151	9.17	−18.98
Turnout		1,648		
Labour hold		Swing		

=== Cramlington Village ===
Cramlington Village (1 seat)
Party	Candidate	Votes	%	±%
Conservative	Mark David Swinburn	974	61.34	+37.42
Labour	Moyra Elizabeth Smith	383	24.12	−13.01
Liberal Democrats	Barrie Crowther	119	7.49	−20.74
UKIP	Tracey Elliott	68	4.28	
No description	Kathy Graham	44	2.77	
Majority		591	37.22	+28.32
Turnout		1,588		
Conservative hold		Swing		

=== Cramlington West ===
Cramlington West (1 seat)
Party	Candidate	Votes	%	±%
Conservative	Barry Malcolm Flux*	1,058	72.17	+17.28
Labour	Jean Whisson	408	27.83	−12.70
Majority		650	44.34	+29.98
Turnout		1,466		
Conservative hold		Swing		

=== Croft ===
Croft (1 seat)
Party	Candidate	Votes	%	±%
Labour	Kath Nisbet*	514	59.56	−11.68
Conservative	Scott Lee	164	19.00	+11.41
UKIP	Robert David Erskine	122	14.14	
Liberal Democrats	Peter Thompson Stranger	63	7.30	0.08
Majority		350	40.56	−16.73
Turnout		863		
Labour hold		Swing		

=== Druridge Bay ===
Druridge Bay (1 seat)
Party	Candidate	Votes	%	±%
Labour	Scott James Dickinson*	796	54.93	−8.20
Independent	James Alexander Grant	307	21.19	
Conservative	Aidan Paul Ruff	254	17.53	−5.52
Liberal Democrats	Mary Clare Bambrough	92	6.35	−7.47
Majority		489	33.74	−6.34
Turnout		1,449		
Labour hold		Swing		

=== Haltwhistle ===
Haltwhistle (1 seat)
Party	Candidate	Votes	%	±%
Conservative	James Ian Hutchinson*	1,027	58.89	+15.86
Labour	Annette McGlade	591	33.89	−2.72
Liberal Democrats	Stuart Alan Rowlands	49	2.81	−2.48
No description	James Kevin Little	44	2.52	
Green	Laura Anne Blenkinsop	33	1.89	
Majority		436	25.00	+18.58
Turnout		1,744		
Conservative hold		Swing		

=== Hartley ===
Hartley (1 seat)
Party	Candidate	Votes	%	±%
Labour	Susan Elizabeth Dungworth*	706	41.55	−16.48
Conservative	Maureen Levy	433	25.49	+9.44
Independent	John Michael Barrell	261	15.36	
Liberal Democrats	Anita Cynthia Romer	205	12.07	−13.85
UKIP	Keren Patterson	94	5.53	
Majority		273	16.06	−16.05
Turnout		1,699		
Labour hold		Swing		

=== Haydon & Hadrian ===
Haydon & Hadrian (1 seat)
Party	Candidate	Votes	%	±%
Liberal Democrats	Alan Sharp*	797	45.46	−0.06
Conservative	Jan Harding	538	30.69	+0.34
Independent	Chris Heslop	251	14.32	
Labour	Stephen Charles Grinter	123	7.02	−3.70
Green	Barbara Jane Grundey	44	2.51	
Majority		259	14.77	−0.40
Turnout		1,753		
Liberal Democrats hold		Swing		

=== Haydon ===
Haydon (1 seat)
Party	Candidate	Votes	%	±%
Labour	Brian Charles Gallacher*	744	65.04	−7.65
Conservative	Lance Robson	193	16.87	+10.68
UKIP	Kai Bye	112	9.79	
Liberal Democrats	Les Morgan	95	8.30	−12.82
Majority		551	48.17	−3.40
Turnout		1,144		
Labour hold		Swing		

=== Hexham Central with Acomb ===
Hexham Central with Acomb (1 seat)
Party	Candidate	Votes	%	±%
Conservative	Trevor Cessford	747	49.87	+1.41
Labour	Penny Grennan	446	29.78	−4.69
Independent	Anne Pickering	137	9.14	
Liberal Democrats	Christopher James Yeomans	100	6.67	+0.96
Green	Nigel Bruce Warner	68	4.54	
Majority		301	20.09	+6.10
Turnout		1,498		
Conservative hold		Swing		

=== Hexham East ===
Hexham East (1 seat)
Party	Candidate	Votes	%	±%
Conservative	Cath Homer*	941	65.67	+19.00
Liberal Democrats	Peter John Arnold	218	15.21	−0.15
Labour	Vanessa Caroline Mary Maughan	206	14.38	−8.09
Green	Mark Jonathan Shipperlee	68	4.74	
Majority		723	50.46	+26.26
Turnout		1,433		
Conservative hold		Swing		

=== Hexham West ===
Hexham West (1 seat)
Party	Candidate	Votes	%	±%
No description	Derek Kennedy	1,095	56.82	
Conservative	Tom Dodds	580	30.10	−18.24
Labour	Chris Wharton	161	8.36	−6.52
Green	David Grundey	91	4.72	
Majority		515	26.72	+9.17
Turnout		1,927		
No description gain from Conservative				

=== Hirst ===
Hirst (1 seat)
Party	Candidate	Votes	%	±%
Labour	Ken Parry*	613	79.10	+18.37
Conservative	Elizabeth Edna Rixon	90	11.61	+8.21
UKIP	Juneille Smith	72	9.29	
Majority		523	67.49	+42.63
Turnout		775		
Labour hold		Swing		

=== Holywell ===
Holywell (1 seat)
Party	Candidate	Votes	%	±%
Labour	Bernard Pidcock*	774	50.23	+3.98
Conservative	Adam Francis Shanley	606	39.32	+31.69
UKIP	Norman Baston	161	10.45	
Majority		168	10.91	−7.01
Turnout		1,541		
Labour hold		Swing		

=== Humshaugh ===
Humshaugh (1 seat)
Party	Candidate	Votes	%	±%
Conservative	Rupert McLure Gibson*	909	55.19	−11.61
Green	Wesley James Foot	477	28.96	
Labour	Quentin Gordon Campbell	158	9.59	−12.26
Liberal Democrats	Tony Selden	103	6.26	−5.08
Majority		432	26.23	−18.72
Turnout		1,647		
Conservative hold		Swing		

=== Isabella ===
Isabella (1 seat)
Party	Candidate	Votes	%	±%
Labour	Gordon Webb*	515	63.89	−16.53
UKIP	John Henry Moore	130	16.13	
Conservative	Stephen Mallam	120	14.89	+5.84
Liberal Democrats	Sandra Stanger	41	5.09	−5.44
Majority		385	47.76	−22.13
Turnout		806		
Labour hold		Swing		

=== Kitty Brewster ===
Kitty Brewster (1 seat)
Party	Candidate	Votes	%	±%
Labour	Grant Davey*	511	45.06	−28.52
Conservative	Ian Levy	339	29.89	+15.82
UKIP	Peter Watson	201	17.73	
Liberal Democrats	Walter Rickerby	83	7.32	−5.03
Majority		172	15.17	−44.34
Turnout		1,134		
Labour hold		Swing		

=== Longhorsley ===
Longhorsley (1 seat)
Party	Candidate	Votes	%	±%
Conservative	Hugh Glen Howard Sanderson*	1,402	84.36	
Labour	Anthony Reay	139	8.36	−63.99
Liberal Democrats	Charles Jevon	121	7.28	−0.07
Majority		1,263	76.00	+14.71
Turnout		1,662		
Conservative gain from Labour		Swing		

=== Longhoughton ===
Longhoughton (1 seat)
Party	Candidate	Votes	%	±%
Conservative	Wendy Pattison	882	52.85	+30.06
Liberal Democrats	Kate Lydia Cairns	679	40.68	
Labour	Thelma Morse	108	6.47	
Majority		203	12.17	−16.05
Turnout		1,669		
Conservative gain from Independent		Swing		

=== Lynemouth ===
Lynemouth (1 seat)
Party	Candidate	Votes	%	±%
Labour	Liz Dunn	593	46.37	−15.23
Independent	Paul Christopher Scott	425	33.23	
Conservative	Thomas Reginald Forrester	202	15.79	+9.26
Liberal Democrats	Dawn Adele Bailey	59	4.61	−27.26
Majority		168	13.14	−16.59
Turnout		1,279		
Labour hold		Swing		

=== Morpeth Kirkhill ===
Morpeth Kirkhill (1 seat)
Party	Candidate	Votes	%	±%
Conservative	Richard Watson Wearmouth	1,228	55.16	+25.26
Liberal Democrats	Andrew Tebbutt*	765	34.37	−11.38
Labour	Adrian Martin James Slassor	233	10.47	−13.88
Majority		463	20.79	+4.94
Turnout		2,226		
Conservative gain from Liberal Democrats		Swing		

=== Morpeth North ===
Morpeth North (1 seat)
Party	Candidate	Votes	%	±%
Conservative	David Lee Bawn*	1,061	49.35	+17.56
Liberal Democrats	Joan Carol Tebbutt	550	25.58	+2.18
Green	Nic Best	318	14.79	−10.99
Labour	Mark David Owen	221	10.28	−8.75
Majority		511	23.77	+17.76
Turnout		2,150		
Conservative hold		Swing		

=== Morpeth Stobhill ===
Morpeth Stobhill (1 seat)
Party	Candidate	Votes	%	±%
Conservative	John Ace Beynon	969	49.59	+17.53
Liberal Democrats	Alison Byard	456	23.34	−14.23
Independent	Ian Lindley*	285	14.58	
Labour	Brenda May Stanton	244	12.49	−17.88
Majority		513	26.25	+20.74
Turnout		1,954		
Conservative gain from Liberal Democrats		Swing		

=== Newbiggin Central & East ===
Newbiggin Central & East (1 seat)
Party	Candidate	Votes	%	±%
Labour	Liz Simpson*	776	70.93	+3.64
Conservative	Dorothy Anne Wonnacott	318	29.07	+20.11
Majority		458	41.86	−1.68
Turnout		1,094		
Labour hold		Swing		

=== Newsham ===
Newsham (1 seat)
Party	Candidate	Votes	%	±%
Labour	Deirdre Campbell*	537	50.66	+4.72
UKIP	Barry William Elliott	304	28.68	−7.99
Conservative	Anne Charlotte Waggitt	219	20.66	+14.93
Majority		233	21.98	+12.71
Turnout		1,060		
Labour hold		Swing		

=== Norham & Islandshires ===
Norham & Islandshires (1 seat)
Party	Candidate	Votes	%	±%
Conservative	Roderick Malcolm Gordon Lawrie	867	50.17	+13.98
Liberal Democrats	Dougie Watkin*	729	42.19	−12.66
Labour	Brian Parkin	132	7.64	−1.32
Majority		138	7.98	−10.68
Turnout		1,728		
Conservative gain from Liberal Democrats		Swing		

=== Pegswood ===
Pegswood (1 seat)
Party	Candidate	Votes	%	±%
Conservative	David James Towns	579	37.80	+19.91
Labour	Sam Sambrook	522	34.07	−6.31
Liberal Democrats	David George Woodard	431	28.13	+2.55
Majority		57	3.73	−11.07
Turnout		1,532		
Conservative gain from Labour		Swing		

=== Plessey ===
Plessey (1 seat)
Party	Candidate	Votes	%	±%
Liberal Democrats	Jeff Reid*	603	45.86	+3.65
Labour	Linda Neslund	379	28.82	−7.64
Conservative	John Durnan	171	13.00	+10.16
UKIP	Rev Cornell	162	12.32	−6.17
Majority		224	17.04	+11.29
Turnout		1,315		
Liberal Democrats hold		Swing		

=== Ponteland East & Stannington ===
Ponteland East & Stannington (1 seat)
Party	Candidate	Votes	%	±%
Conservative	Eileen Armstrong*	1,200	77.82	−5.37
Labour	Tony Reid	134	8.69	
Liberal Democrats	Chris Matthew	116	7.52	
Green	Paul Anthony Lawrence	92	5.97	
Majority		1,066	69.13	+2.75
Turnout		1,542		
Conservative hold		Swing		

=== Ponteland North ===
Ponteland North (1 seat)
Party	Candidate	Votes	%	±%
Conservative	Richard Robert Dodd*	1,380	87.73	
Labour	Simon Neale Railton	137	8.71	
Liberal Democrats	Philip Neil Pennington	56	3.56	
Majority		1,243	79.17	
Turnout		1,573		
Conservative hold		Swing		

=== Ponteland South with Heddon ===
Ponteland South with Heddon (1 seat)
Party	Candidate	Votes	%	±%
Conservative	Peter Alan Jackson*	1,195	78.00	−3.40
Labour	Andy Avery	199	12.99	
Liberal Democrats	Tom Hancock	138	9.01	−9.59
Majority		996	65.01	+2.21
Turnout		1,532		
Conservative hold		Swing		

=== Ponteland West ===
Ponteland West (1 seat)
Party	Candidate	Votes	%	±%
Conservative	Veronica Jones*	1,175	85.64	+5.16
Labour	John Hampton	197	14.36	−5.16
Majority		978	71.28	+10.32
Turnout		1,372		
Conservative hold		Swing		

=== Prudhoe North ===
Prudhoe North (1 seat)
Party	Candidate	Votes	%	±%
Conservative	Kenneth George Stow	653	44.27	+22.76
Labour	Eileen Burt*	579	39.25	−9.87
Liberal Democrats	Rosie Anderson	93	6.31	+2.04
UKIP	Stuart Miles	88	5.97	−19.13
Green	Pamela Jane Woolner	62	4.20	
Majority		74	5.02	−19.00
Turnout		1,475		
Conservative gain from Labour		Swing		

=== Prudhoe South ===
Prudhoe South (1 seat)
Party	Candidate	Votes	%	±%
Conservative	Gordon Stewart	564	39.00	+21.81
Independent	Sarah Jane Eden	539	37.28	
Labour	Glenn William Simpson	254	17.57	−35.17
UKIP	Graham Edward Young	54	3.73	−21.63
Liberal Democrats	Robert Charles Theobald	35	2.42	−2.29
Majority		25	1.72	−25.66
Turnout		1,446		
Conservative gain from Labour		Swing		

=== Rothbury ===
Rothbury (1 seat)
Party	Candidate	Votes	%	±%
Independent	Steven Christopher Bridgett*	1,471	65.49	
Conservative	Gavin William Thomas Egdell	534	23.78	−1.00
Green	David McKechnie	160	7.12	
Labour	Sandra Dickinson	81	3.61	−0.75
Majority		937	41.71	−4.37
Turnout		2,246		
Independent gain from Liberal Democrats		Swing		

=== Seaton with Newbiggin West ===
Seaton with Newbiggin West (1 seat)
Party	Candidate	Votes	%	±%
Labour	James Aidan Lang*	756	72.69	−5.64
Conservative	Betty Margaret Bawn	284	27.31	+23.40
Majority		472	45.38	−21.79
Turnout		1,040		
Labour hold		Swing		

=== Seghill with Seaton Delaval ===
Seghill with Seaton Delaval (1 seat)
Party	Candidate	Votes	%	±%
Labour	Margaret Evelyn Richards*	710	49.44	−23.79
Conservative	Simon Troy Hartland	608	42.34	+26.56
UKIP	Robert James Forsyth	118	8.22	
Majority		102	7.10	−50.35
Turnout		1,436		
Labour hold		Swing		

=== Shilbottle ===
Shilbottle (1 seat)
Party	Candidate	Votes	%	±%
Conservative	Trevor Norman Thorne*	1,161	65.19	+19.79
Liberal Democrats	Liz Whitelam	291	16.34	+10.29
Labour	Stewart Selkirk	256	14.37	−13.88
UKIP	John Anderson Curry	73	4.10	−16.20
Majority		870	48.85	+31.70
Turnout		1,781		
Conservative hold		Swing		

=== Sleekburn ===
Sleekburn (1 seat)
Party	Candidate	Votes	%	±%
Labour	Jeff Gobin	380	36.71	−20.60
Conservative	Thomas James Peacock	261	25.22	+18.20
Independent	Kath Burn	223	21.55	
UKIP	Steve Aynsley	171	16.52	
Majority		119	11.49	−10.15
Turnout		1,035		
Labour hold		Swing		

=== South Blyth ===
South Blyth (1 seat)
Party	Candidate	Votes	%	±%
Liberal Democrats	Lesley Jennifer Rickerby*	357	28.93	−17.18
Conservative	Daniel Carr	356	28.85	+22.24
Labour	Olga Potts	305	24.72	+1.46
UKIP	Peter Potts	216	17.50	−6.52
Majority		1	0.08	−22.01
Turnout		1,234		
Liberal Democrats hold		Swing		

=== South Tynedale ===
South Tynedale (1 seat)
Party	Candidate	Votes	%	±%
Conservative	Colin William Horncastle*	1,249	71.62	+0.21
Liberal Democrats	Avril Lynda Grundy	183	10.49	+2.61
Labour	John Alexander Lindsay Hill	171	9.81	−10.90
Green	Richard Sutton	141	8.08	
Majority		1,066	61.13	+10.43
Turnout		1,744		
Conservative hold		Swing		

=== Stakeford ===
Stakeford (1 seat)
Party	Candidate	Votes	%	±%
Labour	Julie Denise Foster*	814	64.40	−13.92
Conservative	Charlotte Elizabeth Blundred	450	35.60	+13.92
Majority		364	28.80	−27.84
Turnout		1,264		
Labour hold		Swing		

=== Stocksfield & Broomhaugh ===
Stocksfield & Broomhaugh (1 seat)
Party	Candidate	Votes	%	±%
Independent	Patricia Anne Mary Dale*	1,312	63.05	−10.05
Conservative	Charles William Roland Heslop	528	25.37	+7.61
Labour	Bill Haylock	132	6.34	−2.80
Liberal Democrats	Philip Ronald Latham	109	5.24	
Majority		784	37.68	−17.66
Turnout		2,081		
Independent hold		Swing		

=== Wensleydale ===
Wensleydale (1 seat)
Party	Candidate	Votes	%	±%
Labour	Eileen Cartie*	641	54.60	−14.92
Liberal Democrats	Penny Reid	203	17.29	−4.53
Conservative	Gary Hopewell	197	16.78	+8.12
UKIP	Anna Moore	133	11.33	
Majority		438	37.31	−10.39
Turnout		1,174		
Labour hold		Swing		

=== Wooler ===
Wooler (1 seat)
Party	Candidate	Votes	%	±%
Conservative	Anthony Harkness Murray*	1,272	72.94	+8.69
Liberal Democrats	Rosemary Cott	181	10.38	+2.07
Green	James John Jobson	165	9.46	
Labour	David John Charles Bull	126	7.22	0.34
Majority		1,091	62.56	+18.87
Turnout		1,744		
Conservative hold		Swing		
