= Ronnie Campbell =

British politician (1943–2024)

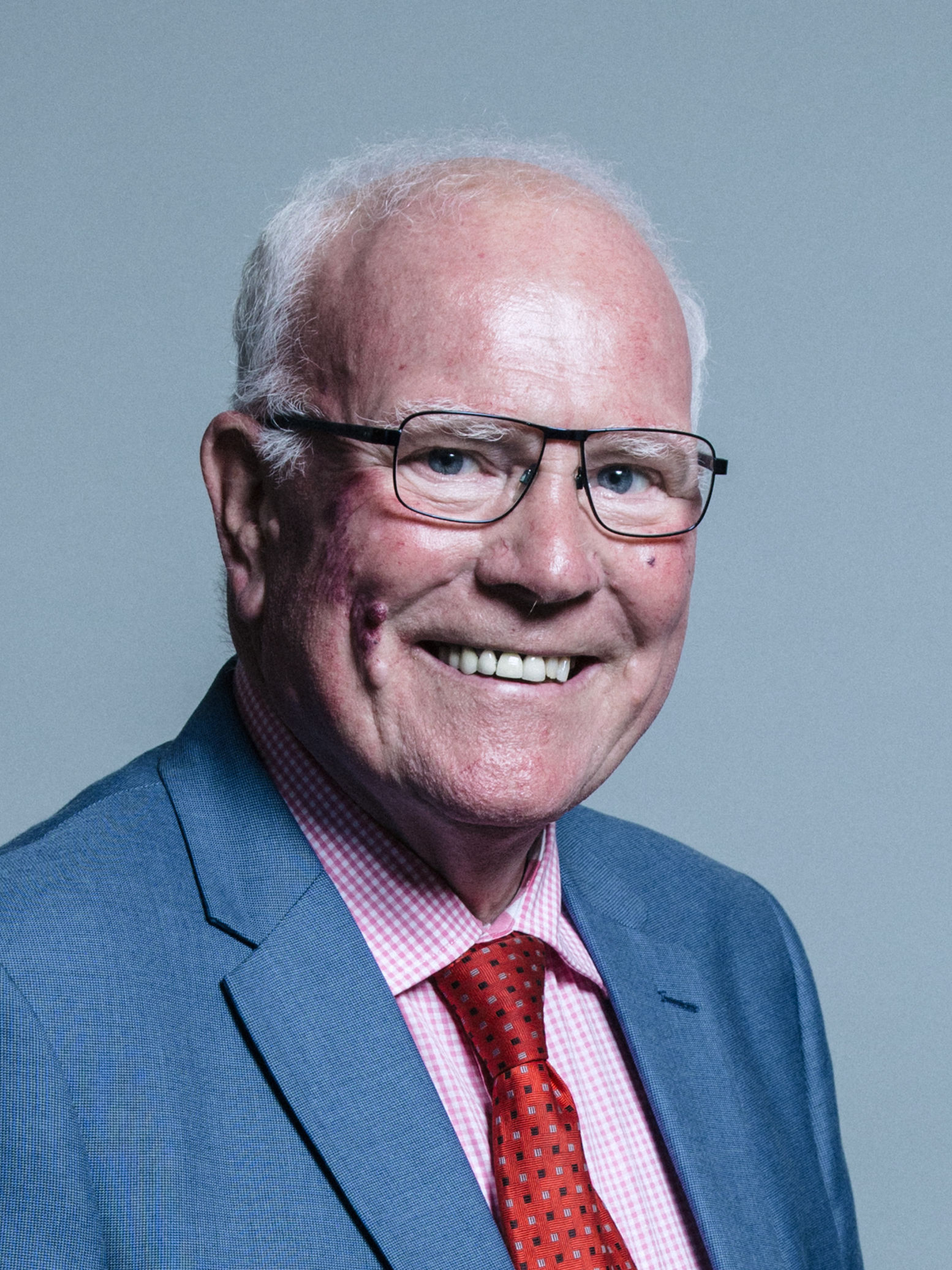
- Official portrait, 2017

Member of Parliament for Blyth Valley
- In office 11 June 1987 – 6 November 2019
- Preceded by: John Ryman
- Succeeded by: Ian Levy

Personal details
- Born: 14 August 1943 Tynemouth, Northumberland, England
- Died: 23 February 2024 (aged 80)
- Party: Labour
- Other political affiliations: Socialist Campaign Group
- Spouse: Deirdre McHale (m. 1967)
- Children: 6
- Relatives: Eric McGraw (half-brother)

Ronald Campbell (14 August 1943 – 23 February 2024) was a British Labour politician who was Member of Parliament (MP) for Blyth Valley from 1987 until 2019.

== Early life ==
Ronald Campbell was born in Tynemouth, and grew up with seven siblings. He attended Blyth Ridley County High School, a secondary modern, and left school at 14 to become a coal miner. Before entering parliament he was a councillor for Croft Ward, Blyth Borough, Northumberland from 1969 and a lay official of the National Union of Mineworkers (NUM). He was a miner from 1958 to 1986. Campbell led picket lines in the 1984–85 miners' strike and was arrested twice.

== Parliamentary career ==
Campbell was first elected as an MP for Blyth Valley at the 1987 general election with a majority of 853 votes. He often voted against the Blair government on issues such as the Iraq War. He was an outspoken socialist. When the government nationalised Northern Rock in 2008, Campbell declared it "the People's Bank" and opened an account.

In May 2009, during the high-profile MPs expenses scandal, Campbell agreed to return over £6,000 of the £87,729 he had claimed for furnishings in his London home.

Campbell voted for Andy Burnham in the 2010 Labour Party leadership election following the resignation of Gordon Brown. He was critical of Ed Miliband's leadership of the Labour Party, referring to him as a "right winger". In 2013, he was one of 22 Labour MPs to vote against same-sex marriage, out of 255.

Upon re-election in May 2015, Campbell announced that he would stand down at the next general election, although this did not materialise.

Campbell was one of 36 Labour MPs to nominate Jeremy Corbyn as a candidate in the Labour leadership election of 2015 and one of a handful of Labour MPs to publicly support leaving the European Union. Campbell continued to support Brexit, and to vote against attempts to delay it, in subsequent parliamentary votes. He justified this by noting that "I am a leaver, and I always have been. MPs are elected, unlike the EU bureaucrats, and if people don't like how MPs vote then they can get rid of us and that's how it should work."

Campbell was one of 13 MPs to vote against triggering the 2017 general election. Having previously said he would stand down at the next election, he changed his mind, stating: "It was my intention to stand down at the next general election, however due to circumstances following the announcement of the snap election I have decided to stand again for Blyth Valley."

In June 2019, Campbell confirmed that he would stand down as an MP in the following election, which was later confirmed for December 2019. He subsequently said he would back the Conservative government's deal to leave the European Union.

Campbell was a member of the Socialist Campaign group, a socialist, left-wing group of Labour MPs.

== Personal life ==
Campbell married Deirdre McHale in 1967, who serves on Northumberland County Council. They had five sons, including a set of twins, and one daughter. While he served as an MP, Campbell had a reunion with his half-brother, Eric McGraw, whom he had not known due to the latter's adoption.

In September 2016, Campbell underwent chemotherapy after being diagnosed with stomach cancer. He returned to Parliament on 30 November 2016 and was welcomed back during Prime Minister's Questions.

His interests included horse racing.

Campbell died on 23 February 2024, at the age of 80.

Parliament of the United Kingdom
Preceded by John Ryman	Member of Parliament for Blyth Valley; 1987–2019	Succeeded by Ian Levy
