= Edward Milne =

Edward Milne may refer to:

- Edward Arthur Milne (1896–1950), British mathematician and astrophysicist
- Eddie Milne (1915–1983), British Labour Party Member of Parliament for Blyth, afterwards re-elected as an independent
