= 2008 Northumberland County Council election =

2008 UK local government election

← 2005	1 May 2008	2013 →

All 67 seats to Northumberland County Council 34 seats needed for a majority
- Turnout: 41.2%
	First party	Second party
Party	Liberal Democrats	Conservative
Last election	14	14
Seats won	26	17
Seat change	▲12	▲3
Popular vote	36,586	29,777
Percentage	36.5%	29.7%
	Third party	Fourth party
Party	Labour	Independent
Last election	35	4
Seats won	17	7
Seat change	▼18	▲3
Popular vote	22,257	11,031
Percentage	22.2%	11.0%
- Map of the results of the 2008 local election.
Control of Council before election
Labour Party
Control of Council after election
No overall control

Local elections to Northumberland County Council, a county council in the north east of England, were held on 1 May 2008, resulting in a council with no overall control and with Liberal Democrat members forming the largest political group on the new unitary authority Council.

== Results ==
Northumberland County Council election, 2008
Party	Seats	Gains	Losses	Net gain/loss	Seats %	Votes %	Votes	+/−
Liberal Democrats	26					36.5	36,586	
Conservative	17					29.7	29,777	
Labour	17					22.2	22,257	
Independent	7					11.0	11,077	
Green	0					0.4	425	
UKIP	0					0.2	159	
BNP	0					0.1	88	
