= Erwin James =

English murderer and columnist (1957–2024)

- Born: Erwin James Monahan; 18 March 1957; Somerset, England
- Died: 19 January 2024 (aged 66); Devon, England
- Occupations: Recidivist criminal; newspaper columnist

Erwin James Monahan (18 April 1957 – 19 January 2024) was a British convicted recidivist criminal and murderer who became a newspaper columnist and wrote for The Guardian from 1998, writing under the name "Erwin James" while still incarcerated. He was released in August 2004, having served 20 years of a life sentence.

From 2000, he wrote a regular column about prison life entitled A Life Inside, the first column of its kind in the history of British journalism. He continued to write for the national press and became the editor-in-chief of Inside Time, a national newspaper in the UK for people in prison, as well as doing charity work, after his release. While he was in prison, fees for his articles were paid not to him but to the Prisoners' Advice Service charity, which had helped him.

== Biography ==
Monahan was born in Somerset, England, to Scottish parents. His mother died in a car crash when he was seven; he was separated from his sister when she was 20 months old. Following the crash, his grieving father turned to alcohol and became a violent drunk, taking his troubles out on his subsequent partners and on the young Erwin. Monahan committed his first crime when he was 10, breaking into a sweet shop. He eventually accumulated 53 criminal convictions, including for burglary, theft, criminal damage, assault and mugging, and ultimately two convictions for murder, for which he was sentenced to life imprisonment.

Monahan and his co-defendant, William Ross, whom he had met in a squat in London, were convicted of murdering theatrical agent Greville Hallam and solicitor Angus Cochran in 1982. Hallam was found strangled in his home in London. Cochran was murdered three months later after being mugged. Following the murders, Monahan fled to France and joined the French Foreign Legion, serving in Corsica and Africa. After receiving information from Ross, Monahan was traced by Scotland Yard, and in August 1984 he handed himself in to the British Consul in Nice.

Monahan and Ross both pleaded not guilty to murder on both charges, each blaming the other for the killings. Another man implicated in the murders, Paul Dunwell, avoided prosecution by agreeing to give evidence for the prosecution against the pair. Justice Otton, who presided over the case, described Monahan as "brutal, vicious and callous" and sentenced him to life imprisonment with a minimum term of 14 years, subsequently increased to 25 years by the Home Secretary. Ross was also sentenced to life imprisonment; he was released from prison to a hostel in March 2014.

In January 2006, Monahan wrote an article for G2, a section of The Guardian (as "Erwin James"), recalling his time in the French Foreign Legion. In 2009, he admitted that part of the article detailing experiences in Beirut was untrue, as he had not served there.

For the majority of the time during which he wrote for The Guardian, the circumstances leading to his arrests and convictions were not revealed, but in April 2009 Monahan's full name became public.

Monahan wrote in G2 in April 2009 that his behaviour had been unforgivable and that "I seek no forgiveness now."

James died after hitting his head in a fall on 19 January 2024, at the age of 66, in Devon. Following his death Ian Katz, who had first commissioned him to write for The Guardian, described "Jim" as an "acute observer of people and ... physical embodiment of the possibility that even people who have done the most terrible things can turn their lives around in prison and earn a second chance at life ...he challenged our assumptions ... about those who commit the most heinous crimes". In October 2025, an inquest found that James had drowned after falling into the sea at Brixham while intoxicated.

== Published works ==
- A Life Inside: A Prisoner's Notebook (2003)
- The Home Stretch: From Prison to Parole (2005)
- Redeemable: A Memoir of Darkness and Hope (2016)
