= 1960 Blyth by-election =

UK Parliamentary by-election

The 1960 Blyth by-election was held in the constituency of Blyth, now Blyth Valley, on 24 November 1960, following the appointment of Alfred Robens, who had served as Member of Parliament since the constituency's establishment in 1950, as chair of the National Coal Board.

Three candidates stood: Eddie Milne of the Labour Party, Dennis Walters MBE for the Conservatives and Mr. C. Pym as an independent. The seat was considered a safe Labour hold, Robens having won the seat in the 1959 general election with a majority of 25,000.

This proved to be the case, and Milne was elected with a reduced majority of 16,072 over the other two candidates. He would serve as MP for Blyth until 1974.

== Result ==
Polling took place on 24 November 1960.

Blyth by-election, 1960
| Party | Candidate | Votes | % | ±% |
|---|---|---|---|---|
| Labour | Eddie Milne | 23,438 | 68.9 | −5.7 |
| Conservative | Dennis Walters | 7,366 | 21.6 | −3.8 |
| Independent | C. Pym | 3,223 | 9.5 | New |
| Majority | | 16,072 | 47.3 | −1.9 |
| Turnout | | 34,027 | | |
| Labour hold | | Swing | | |
