= Blyth Valley (constituency) =

UK Parliament constituency in England between 1950 and 2024

- Former county constituency for the House of Commons
- 2010–2024 boundary of Blyth Valley in Northumberland

- Location of Northumberland within England
- County: Northumberland
- Population: 82,174 (2011 UK Census)
- Electorate: 63,173 (December 2010)
- Major settlements: Blyth, Cramlington, Seaton Delaval

1950–2024
- Seats: One
- Created from: Morpeth, Wansbeck
- Replaced by: Cramlington and Killingworth (most), Blyth and Ashington (part)

Blyth Valley, formerly known as Blyth, was a constituency (Note: A county constituency (for the purposes of election expenses and type of returning officer)) most recently represented in the House of Commons of the UK Parliament from 2019 by Ian Levy, a Conservative (Note: As with all constituencies, the constituency elects one Member of Parliament (MP) by the first past the post system of election at least every five years.) until its abolition in 2024.

Under the 2023 Periodic Review of Westminster constituencies, the seat was abolished, with the majority of its contents - excluding the town of Blyth itself - being absorbed into the new constituency of Cramlington and Killingworth, to be first contested at the 2024 general election. Blyth was included in the new constituency of Blyth and Ashington.

== Constituency profile ==
The constituency is in the former Northumberland Coalfield where mining and shipbuilding were once significant industries. Residents' incomes and wealth are slightly below average for the UK.

== History ==
The constituency of Blyth was established under the Representation of the People Act 1948 for the 1950 general election. Following the reorganisation of local authorities resulting from the Local Government Act 1972, it was renamed Blyth Valley for the 1983 general election to correspond with the newly formed Borough of Blyth Valley.

In the 2019 general election, Blyth Valley was the third seat to declare and the first Conservative victory of the election, pointing towards many similar Conservative victories in Labour's Red Wall as the night went on.

== Boundaries ==
Map of 1983-2024 boundaries

1950–1974 (Blyth): The Municipal Borough of Blyth, and the Urban Districts of Bedlingtonshire, and Seaton Valley.

Blyth and Bedlington were transferred from Morpeth. Seaton Valley (incorporating Cramlington, Seghill, Earsdon and Seaton Delaval) was added from the abolished constituency of Wansbeck.

1974–1983 (Blyth): The borough of Blyth, and the urban districts of Bedlingtonshire, and Seaton Valley.

The boundary with Hexham was slightly amended to take account of changes to local government boundaries.

1983–2024 (Blyth Valley): The Borough of Blyth Valley.

Bedlington was transferred to the re-established constituency of Wansbeck. Small area in the south (Backworth and Earsdon), which was now part of the metropolitan borough of North Tyneside in Tyne and Wear, transferred to Wallsend.

In the fifth periodic boundary review of parliamentary representation in Northumberland, which came into effect for the 2010 general election, the Boundary Commission for England recommended that no changes be made to the Blyth Valley constituency.

In 2009, a further government reorganisation resulted in the abolition of all local government boroughs and districts in Northumberland and the establishment of the county as a unitary authority. Accordingly, although this did not affect constituency boundaries in Northumberland, for 2009-2024 the constituency contained the Northumberland County Council wards of: Cowpen, Cramlington East, Cramlington Eastfield, Cramlington North, Cramlington South East, Cramlington Village, Cramlington West, Croft, Hartley, Holywell, Isabella, Kitty Brewster, Newsham, Plessey, Seghill with Seaton Delaval, South Blyth, and Wensleydale.

== Members of Parliament ==
| Event | Member | Party |
|---|---|---|
| 1950 | Alfred Robens | Labour |
| 1960 by-election | Eddie Milne | Labour |
| February 1974 | Eddie Milne | Independent Labour |
| October 1974 | John Ryman | Labour |
| 1987 | Ronnie Campbell | Labour |
| 2019 | Ian Levy | Conservative |
| 2024 | Constituency abolished | |

== Election results 1950–2024 ==
=== Elections in the 1950s ===
General election 1950: Blyth
| Party | Candidate | Votes | % | ±% |
|---|---|---|---|---|
| Labour | Alfred Robens | 40,245 | 74.7 | |
| Conservative | L.J. Amos | 13,665 | 25.4 | |
| Majority | | 26,580 | 49.3 | |
| Turnout | | 53,910 | 86.97 | |
| Labour win (new seat) | | | | |

General election 1951: Blyth
| Party | Candidate | Votes | % | ±% |
|---|---|---|---|---|
| Labour | Alfred Robens | 39,823 | 73.7 | −1.0 |
| Conservative | George Peters | 14,184 | 26.3 | +0.9 |
| Majority | | 25,693 | 47.4 | −1.9 |
| Turnout | | 54,007 | 86.25 | −0.72 |
| Labour hold | | Swing | +0.95 | |

General election 1955: Blyth
| Party | Candidate | Votes | % | ±% |
|---|---|---|---|---|
| Labour | Alfred Robens | 36,522 | 73.1 | −0.6 |
| Conservative | Nicholas Ridley | 13,429 | 26.9 | +0.6 |
| Majority | | 23,093 | 46.2 | −1.2 |
| Turnout | | 49,951 | 80.3 | −5.95 |
| Labour hold | | Swing | +0.6 | |

General election 1959: Blyth
| Party | Candidate | Votes | % | ±% |
|---|---|---|---|---|
| Labour | Alfred Robens | 38,616 | 74.6 | +1.5 |
| Conservative | Dennis Walters | 13,122 | 25.4 | −1.5 |
| Majority | | 25,494 | 49.2 | +3.0 |
| Turnout | | 51,738 | 82.7 | +2.4 |
| Labour hold | | Swing | +1.5 | |

=== Elections in the 1960s ===
1960 Blyth by-election
| Party | Candidate | Votes | % | ±% |
|---|---|---|---|---|
| Labour | Eddie Milne | 23,438 | 68.9 | −5.7 |
| Conservative | Dennis Walters | 7,366 | 21.6 | −3.8 |
| Independent | C. Pym | 3,223 | 9.5 | New |
| Majority | | 16,072 | 47.3 | −1.9 |
| Turnout | | 34,027 | | |
| Labour hold | | Swing | | |

General election 1964: Blyth
| Party | Candidate | Votes | % | ±% |
|---|---|---|---|---|
| Labour | Eddie Milne | 37,336 | 75.9 | +1.3 |
| Conservative | Geoffrey P Davidson | 11,832 | 24.1 | −1.3 |
| Majority | | 25,504 | 51.8 | +2.6 |
| Turnout | | 49,168 | 78.3 | −4.4 |
| Labour hold | | Swing | | |

General election 1966: Blyth
| Party | Candidate | Votes | % | ±% |
|---|---|---|---|---|
| Labour | Eddie Milne | 36,493 | 78.2 | +2.3 |
| Conservative | William J Prime | 10,179 | 21.8 | −2.3 |
| Majority | | 26,314 | 56.4 | +4.6 |
| Turnout | | 46,672 | 74.4 | −3.9 |
| Labour hold | | Swing | +2.3 | |

=== Elections in the 1970s ===
General election 1970: Blyth
| Party | Candidate | Votes | % | ±% |
|---|---|---|---|---|
| Labour | Eddie Milne | 36,118 | 74.2 | −4.0 |
| Conservative | Anthony J Blackburn | 12,550 | 25.8 | +4.0 |
| Majority | | 23,568 | 48.4 | −8.0 |
| Turnout | | 48,668 | 71.6 | −2.8 |
| Labour hold | | Swing | −4.0 | |

General election February 1974: Blyth
| Party | Candidate | Votes | % | ±% |
|---|---|---|---|---|
| Independent Labour | Eddie Milne | 22,918 | 38.9 | +38.9 |
| Labour | Ivor Richard | 16,778 | 28.5 | −45.7 |
| Liberal | John Shipley | 10,214 | 17.4 | New |
| Conservative | Brian Griffiths | 8,888 | 15.1 | −10.7 |
| Majority | | 6,140 | 10.4 | N/A |
| Turnout | | 58,798 | 79.5 | +7.9 |
| Independent Labour gain from Labour | | Swing | +42.3 | |

General election October 1974: Blyth
| Party | Candidate | Votes | % | ±% |
|---|---|---|---|---|
| Labour | John Ryman | 20,308 | 36.7 | +8.2 |
| Independent Labour | Eddie Milne | 20,230 | 36.6 | −2.3 |
| Liberal | John Shipley | 8,177 | 14.8 | −2.6 |
| Conservative | Brian Griffiths | 6,590 | 11.9 | −3.2 |
| Majority | | 78 | 0.1 | N/A |
| Turnout | | 55,305 | 74.3 | −5.2 |
| Labour gain from Independent Labour | | Swing | +5.25 | |

General election 1979: Blyth
| Party | Candidate | Votes | % | ±% |
|---|---|---|---|---|
| Labour | John Ryman | 25,047 | 40.1 | +3.4 |
| Independent Labour | Eddie Milne | 17,987 | 28.8 | −7.8 |
| Conservative | Emma Nicholson | 14,194 | 22.8 | +10.9 |
| Liberal | D. Parkin | 5,176 | 8.3 | −6.5 |
| Majority | | 7,060 | 11.3 | +11.2 |
| Turnout | | 62,404 | 78.3 | −4.0 |
| Labour hold | | Swing | +5.6 | |

=== Elections in the 1980s ===
General election 1983: Blyth Valley
| Party | Candidate | Votes | % | ±% |
|---|---|---|---|---|
| Labour | John Ryman | 16,583 | 39.5 | −0.6 |
| SDP | Rosemary Brownlow | 13,340 | 31.8 | +23.5 |
| Conservative | Andrew Hargreaves | 11,657 | 27.8 | +5.0 |
| Independent | S. Robinson | 406 | 0.9 | +0.9 |
| Majority | | 3,243 | 7.7 | −3.6 |
| Turnout | | 41,986 | 72.8 | −5.5 |
| Labour hold | | Swing | | |

General election 1987: Blyth Valley
| Party | Candidate | Votes | % | ±% |
|---|---|---|---|---|
| Labour | Ronnie Campbell | 19,604 | 42.5 | +3.0 |
| SDP | Rosemary Brownlow | 18,751 | 40.6 | +8.8 |
| Conservative | Robert Kinghorn | 7,823 | 16.9 | −10.9 |
| Majority | | 853 | 1.9 | −5.8 |
| Turnout | | 46,178 | 78.1 | +5.3 |
| Labour hold | | Swing | | |

=== Elections in the 1990s ===
General election 1992: Blyth Valley
| Party | Candidate | Votes | % | ±% |
|---|---|---|---|---|
| Labour | Ronnie Campbell | 24,542 | 49.9 | +7.4 |
| Liberal Democrats | Peter M. Tracey | 16,498 | 33.5 | −7.1 |
| Conservative | Michael J. Revell | 7,691 | 15.6 | −1.3 |
| Green | Stephen P. Tyley | 470 | 1.0 | New |
| Majority | | 8,044 | 16.4 | +14.5 |
| Turnout | | 49,201 | 80.7 | +2.6 |
| Labour hold | | Swing | +7.3 | |

General election 1997: Blyth Valley
| Party | Candidate | Votes | % | ±% |
|---|---|---|---|---|
| Labour | Ronnie Campbell | 27,276 | 64.2 | +14.3 |
| Liberal Democrats | Andrew Lamb | 9,540 | 22.5 | −11.0 |
| Conservative | Barbara Musgrave | 5,666 | 13.3 | −2.3 |
| Majority | | 17,736 | 41.7 | +25.3 |
| Turnout | | 42,482 | 68.8 | −11.9 |
| Labour hold | | Swing | +12.7 | |

=== Elections in the 2000s ===
General election 2001: Blyth Valley
| Party | Candidate | Votes | % | ±% |
|---|---|---|---|---|
| Labour | Ronnie Campbell | 20,627 | 59.7 | −4.5 |
| Liberal Democrats | Jeffrey Reid | 8,439 | 24.4 | +1.9 |
| Conservative | Wayne Daley | 5,484 | 15.9 | +2.6 |
| Majority | | 12,188 | 35.3 | −6.6 |
| Turnout | | 34,550 | 54.7 | −14.1 |
| Labour hold | | Swing | −3.2 | |

General election 2005: Blyth Valley
| Party | Candidate | Votes | % | ±% |
|---|---|---|---|---|
| Labour | Ronnie Campbell | 19,659 | 55.0 | −4.7 |
| Liberal Democrats | Jeffrey Reid | 11,132 | 31.1 | +6.7 |
| Conservative | Michael Windridge | 4,982 | 13.9 | −2.0 |
| Majority | | 8,527 | 23.9 | −11.4 |
| Turnout | | 35,773 | 56.2 | +1.5 |
| Labour hold | | Swing | −5.7 | |

=== Elections in the 2010s ===
General election 2010: Blyth Valley
| Party | Candidate | Votes | % | ±% |
|---|---|---|---|---|
| Labour | Ronnie Campbell | 17,156 | 44.5 | −10.5 |
| Liberal Democrats | Jeff Reid | 10,488 | 27.2 | −3.9 |
| Conservative | Barry Flux | 6,412 | 16.6 | +2.7 |
| BNP | Steve Fairbairn | 1,699 | 4.4 | New |
| UKIP | Jim Condon | 1,665 | 4.3 | New |
| Independent | Barry Elliott | 819 | 2.1 | New |
| English Democrat | Allan White | 327 | 0.8 | New |
| Majority | | 6,668 | 17.3 | −6.6 |
| Turnout | | 38,566 | 60.0 | +3.8 |
| Labour hold | | Swing | −3.3 | |

General election 2015: Blyth Valley
| Party | Candidate | Votes | % | ±% |
|---|---|---|---|---|
| Labour | Ronnie Campbell | 17,813 | 46.3 | +1.8 |
| UKIP | Barry Elliott | 8,584 | 22.3 | +18.0 |
| Conservative | Greg Munro | 8,346 | 21.7 | +5.1 |
| Liberal Democrats | Philip Latham | 2,265 | 5.9 | −21.3 |
| Green | Dawn Furness | 1,453 | 3.8 | New |
| Majority | | 9,229 | 24.0 | +6.7 |
| Turnout | | 38,461 | 62.8 | +2.8 |
| Labour hold | | Swing | −8.1 | |

General election 2017: Blyth Valley
| Party | Candidate | Votes | % | ±% |
|---|---|---|---|---|
| Labour | Ronnie Campbell | 23,770 | 55.9 | +9.6 |
| Conservative | Ian Levy | 15,855 | 36.9 | +15.2 |
| Liberal Democrats | Jeff Reid | 1,947 | 4.6 | −1.3 |
| Green | Dawn Furness | 918 | 2.2 | −1.6 |
| Majority | | 7,915 | 19.0 | −5.0 |
| Turnout | | 42,490 | 67.0 | +4.2 |
| Labour hold | | Swing | −2.8 | |

General election 2019: Blyth Valley
| Party | Candidate | Votes | % | ±% |
|---|---|---|---|---|
| Conservative | Ian Levy | 17,440 | 42.7 | +5.8 |
| Labour Co-op | Susan Dungworth | 16,728 | 40.9 | −15.0 |
| Brexit Party | Mark Peart | 3,394 | 8.3 | New |
| Liberal Democrats | Thom Chapman | 2,151 | 5.3 | +0.7 |
| Green | Dawn Furness | 1,146 | 2.8 | +0.6 |
| Majority | | 712 | 1.8 | N/A |
| Turnout | | 40,859 | 64.6 | −2.4 |
| Conservative gain from Labour | | Swing | +10.4 | |

== See also ==
- List of parliamentary constituencies in Northumberland
- History of parliamentary constituencies and boundaries in Northumberland
