= John Ryman =

British politician (1930–2009)

John Ryman QC

Member of Parliament for Blyth Valley (Blyth 1974–1983)
- In office 10 October 1974 – 18 May 1987
- Preceded by: Eddie Milne
- Succeeded by: Ronnie Campbell

Personal details
- Born: 7 November 1930
- Died: 3 May 2009 (aged 78)
- Party: Labour
- Spouse: Shirley Summerskill (m. 1957; div. 1971)
- Occupation: Barrister

John Ryman QC (7 November 1930 – 3 May 2009) was a British Labour Party Member of Parliament (MP) who sat as an independent MP for his last year in the House of Commons, who was later convicted of fraud.

Ryman was educated at Leighton Park School, Reading, and Pembroke College, Oxford. Ryman was a barrister and a fox-hunter. He was elected MP for Blyth in the October 1974 general election, ousting the incumbent Eddie Milne (who had been re-elected as an Independent Labour MP at the February 1974 election after being deselected as the official Labour candidate). In 1976 he was fined £400 in under the Representation of the People Act 1949 and the Perjury Act 1911 for falsifying his election expenses return and overspending, although the election result stood.

In a close Parliament, Ryman's frequent absences from Parliament (either to continue his legal work or for other reasons) tried the patience of the whips. On one celebrated occasion the Chief Whip Bob Mellish went on the radio to ask listeners to get in touch if they had spotted him.

When the German Social Democrat Helmut Schmidt urged the Labour Party to support British membership of the EEC, Ryman responded with "Why should this patronising Hun lecture the British Labour Party?"

Ryman held off a strong challenge from Milne in the 1979 general election, holding his seat with a majority of over 7,000. The constituency was renamed Blyth Valley for the 1983 general election, when the newly formed Social Democratic Party (SDP) cut his majority to 3,243. In 1986, he announced that he was leaving the Labour Party and sat as an independent until he retired at the 1987 general election. His successor was Ronnie Campbell.

On 23 April 1992 Ryman was convicted of defrauding two women of their life savings. He had pretended to be the director of a Swiss bank and told the women that they would get 22·5% interest, but in fact paid the money to his ex-wife for maintenance payments. Ryman was given a two-and-a-half-year jail sentence.

== Personal life ==
Ryman was a former husband of Shirley Summerskill, another Labour MP. They married in 1957 but had divorced by the time he entered Parliament. He was married five times in all. He claimed to have invested some money belonging to his fifth wife Nicola, a wealthy widow, in a high-yield Swiss bank account but in fact squandered the money on a horse, Jaguar car and holidays on the Orient Express. He had previously narrowly escaped being prosecuted by the family of a mistress whose money he had also claimed to have invested in a Swiss account.

== Notes ==
Parliament of the United Kingdom
Preceded by Eddie Milne	Member of Parliament for Blyth; 1974–1983	constituency abolished
New constituency	Member of Parliament for Blyth Valley; 1983–1987	Succeeded by Ronnie Campbell
