= John Shipley, Baron Shipley =

British politician (born 1946)

The Right Honourable The Lord Shipley OBE
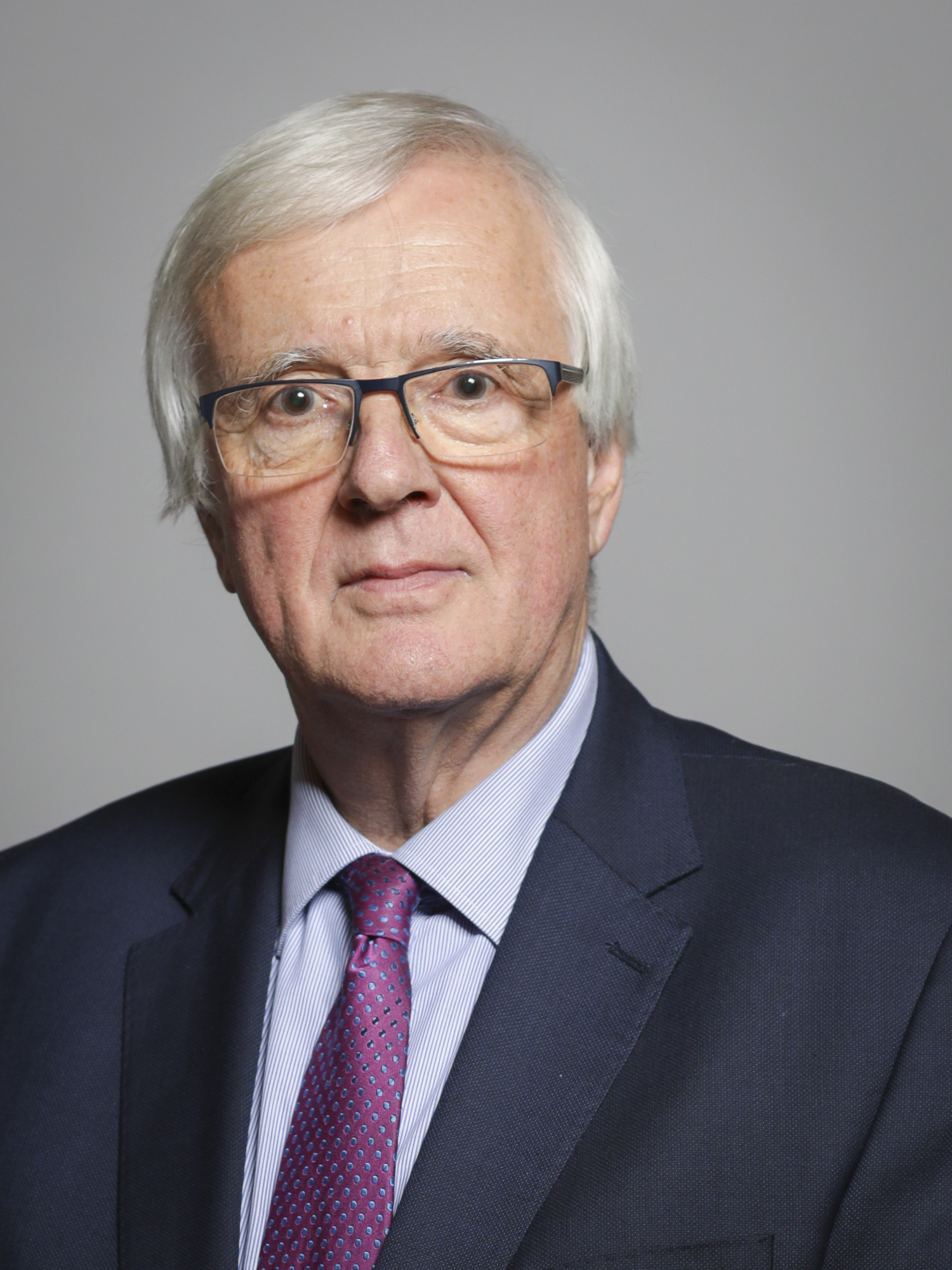

Liberal Democrat Spokesperson for Housing and Planning
- In office 12 October 2017 – 21 August 2019 Serving with Wera Hobhouse (2017–2019); Tim Farron (2019)
- Leader: Sir Vince Cable; Jo Swinson
- Preceded by: Office established
- Succeeded by: Tim Farron

Leader of Newcastle City Council
- In office 10 May 2006 – 1 September 2010
- Preceded by: Peter Arnold
- Succeeded by: David Faulkner

Member of the House of Lords
- Lord Temporal
- Life peerage 14 July 2010 – 31 October 2026

Personal details
- Born: 5 July 1946 (age 80)
- Party: Liberal (until 1988); Liberal Democrats (1988–present)
- Education: University College London

John Warren Shipley, Baron Shipley, OBE (born 5 July 1946) is a British politician who has been a life peer in the House of Lords since 2010. A member of the Liberal Democrats, he previously served as leader of Newcastle City Council between 2006 and 2010.

== Early life and education ==
Shipley was born in Whitby, Yorkshire. He graduated from University College London, where he was also president of the Union, in 1969, with a BA in History.

== Local government ==
Shipley was elected to Newcastle City Council in 1975 as a councillor, before becoming the Opposition Leader between 1988 and 1998. He became leader of the council in 2006 until 2010. In 2010, he became vice-president of the Local Government Association (LGA).

== Parliamentary elections ==
Shipley stood as the Liberal candidate for Blyth in the February and October general elections in 1974, then for Hexham in 1979, as well as the SDP–Liberal Alliance candidate for Newcastle upon Tyne North in the 1983 and 1987 general elections.

== Peerage ==
In the 1995 New Year Honours Shipley was appointed an Officer of the Order of the British Empire (OBE).

He was created a life peer as Baron Shipley of Gosforth on 14 July 2010. Since becoming a peer, he was appointed as a Liberal Democrat spokesperson in Parliament, serving on the frontbench teams of Jo Swinson and Vince Cable between 2017 and 2019.

== Personal life ==
Shipley is a supporter of Sunderland AFC.

Orders of precedence in the United Kingdom
Preceded by The Lord Howard of Lympne	Gentlemen; Baron Shipley	Followed by The Lord Taylor of Goss Moor
