= Derek Ezra, Baron Ezra =

British industrialist, intelligence analyst and nobleman

The Right Honourable The Lord Ezra MBE
- Ezra in 2014

Chairman of the National Coal Board
- In office 1972–1982
- Preceded by: Alf Robens
- Succeeded by: Sir Normal Siddall

Member of the House of Lords
- Lord Temporal
- Life peerage 2 February 1983 – 22 December 2015

Personal details
- Born: 23 February 1919
- Died: 22 December 2015 (aged 96)
- Education: Magdalene College, Cambridge

Derek Ezra, Baron Ezra, MBE (23 February 1919 – 22 December 2015) was a British coal industry administrator who served as Chairman of the National Coal Board for eleven years.

== Early life ==
Ezra attended Monmouth School before going up to Magdalene College, Cambridge, where he graduated with a first class honours degree in History. He joined the Liberal Party in 1936 at university, when he joined Cambridge University Liberal Club, whose committee he later joined. During World War II he worked in intelligence at the Supreme Headquarters Allied Expeditionary Force; he received the U.S. Bronze Star Medal in 1945.

== Career ==
Ezra embarked on a career with the National Coal Board in 1945 and held the post of Chairman of the National Coal Board for the longest term in its history. He was then created a life peer sitting as a Liberal in the member of the Lords, and was a Liberal Democrat parliamentary spokesperson for Energy from 1998 to 2005. Following the death of Denis Healey in October 2015, Ezra became the oldest sitting member of the House of Lords, but took leave of absence on 30 November and died on 22 December 2015.

== Honours ==
In 1945 Ezra was appointed a Member of the Order of the British Empire (MBE), and was knighted on 24 July 1974. He was created a life peer as Baron Ezra, of Horsham in the County of West Sussex on 2 February 1983.

Ezra was admitted a Liveryman Honoris Causa of the Haberdashers' Company, and elected an Honorary Fellow of Magdalene College, Cambridge.

== Derek Ezra Award ==
The Combustion Engineering Association gives the Derek Ezra Award for "outstanding achievement in the study of combustion engineering".

Political offices
Preceded by Alf Robens	Chairman of the National Coal Board; 1972–1982	Succeeded by Sir Norman Siddall
