= Emma Foody =

British politician

Emma Foody MP
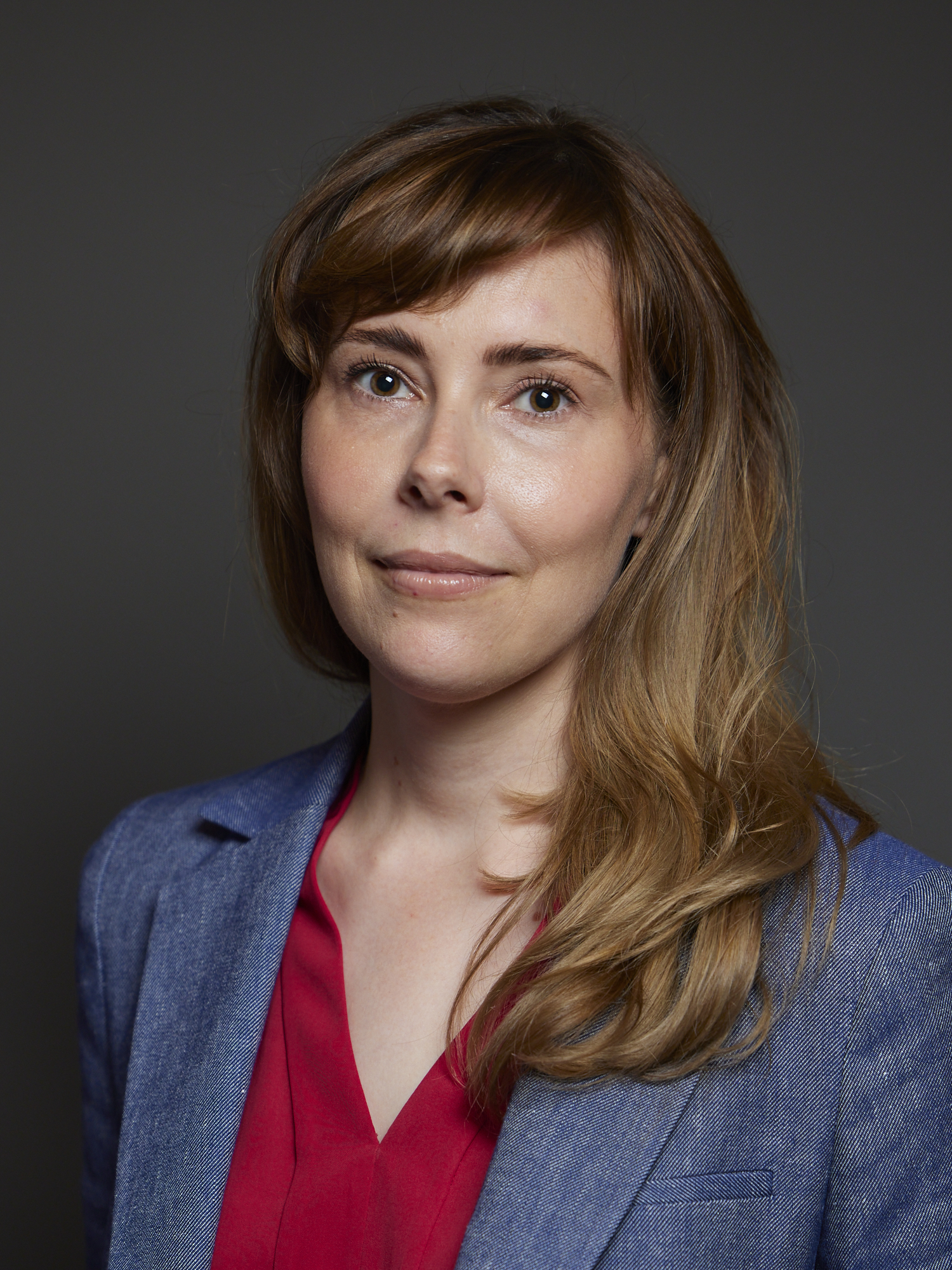
- Official portrait, 2024

Vice-Chamberlain of the Household
- Incumbent
- Assumed office 21 July 2026
- Prime Minister: Andy Burnham
- Preceded by: Nic Dakin

Assistant Government Whip
- In office 12 June 2026 – 21 July 2026
- Preceded by: Jade Botterill

Member of Parliament for Cramlington and Killingworth
- Incumbent
- Assumed office 4 July 2024
- Preceded by: Constituency established
- Majority: 12,820 (28.3%)

Deputy Police and Crime Commissioner for Nottingham
- In office July 2020 – May 2021
- Preceded by: Chris Cutland
- Succeeded by: Position abolished

Personal details
- Born: Emma Louise Foody; August 1987 (age 39) Newcastle-upon-Tyne, England
- Party: Labour Co-op
- Spouse: Alex Norris (m. 2017)
- Education: University of Nottingham (BA)
- Website: emmafoody.com

Emma Louise Foody is a British politician who has served as Member of Parliament (MP) for Cramlington and Killingworth since 2024. A member of the Labour and Co-operative Party, she has been Vice-Chamberlain of the Household since July 2026.

== Early life and education ==
Foody was born in Newcastle and attended St Charles R.C Primary School in Gosforth and Sacred Heart Catholic High School in Fenham, both of which are in Newcastle Upon Tyne.. She grew up in Wideopen in North Tyneside and graduated with a degree in history and politics from the University of Nottingham.

== Career ==
Foody has worked as a magistrate and at the North East Ambulance Service and National Housing Federation. She then worked for the Labour Party in various parts of the country from 2011 to 2020 including as Regional Director from 2017 to 2020.

From 2020 to 2021, Foody served as Deputy Police and Crime Commissioner for Nottinghamshire where she held the responsibility of providing victim support services, including for survivors of domestic abuse and sexual violence.

== Political career ==
Foody was assistant general secretary of the Co-operative Party from 2023 to 2024.

In January 2024, Foody was selected as the Labour and Co-operative candidate for the new constituency of Cramlington and Killingworth, a seat which included the area she was grew up in and now lives. Foody was elected as MP for the new constituency of Cramlington and Killingworth at the 2024 general election, with a majority of 12,820.

Foody was appointed elected to the Parliamentary Committee and appointed as a Parliamentary Private Secretary to Bridget Phillipson, then Education Secretary and Minister for Equalities on June 2024 a role that she held until June 2026, when she was appointed as an Assistant whip.

In July 2026, she was appointed to the new government as Vice Chamberlain of HM Household by Andy Burnham.

Foody presented the Assets of Community Value (Sports Facilities) Bill as a Ten Minute Rule Bill, a Bill to provide local sports clubs with stronger protections. Provisions in the Bill were subsequently incorporated into the English Devolution and Community Empowerment Act 2026.

Foody also spoken about and led debates on new build housing estates in the North East, and co-sponsored the Housing Estates Bill. Other topics have included leasehold reform, support for women veterans and buses.

== Personal life ==
Foody is married to Alex Norris, the Secretary of State for Justice and Labour MP for Nottingham North and Kimberley.

Parliament of the United Kingdom
New constituency	Member of Parliament for Cramlington and Killingworth; 2024–present	Incumbent
