= Inside Time =

UK newspaper for prisoners and detainees

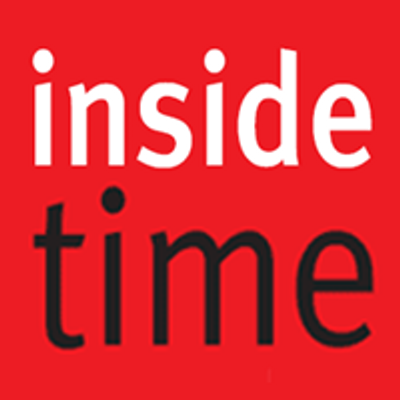

- Front page in April 2024
- Type: Monthly newspaper
- Format: Compact
- Owner: The New Bridge Foundation
- Editor: Ben Leapman
- Founded: 1 December 1990; 35 years ago
- Language: English
- Headquarters: Botley Mills, Botley
- Country: United Kingdom
- Circulation: 55,000
- ISSN: 1743-7342
- Website: insidetime.org

Inside Time is the national newspaper for prisoners and detainees distributed throughout the prison estate of the United Kingdom including Immigration Removal Centres and special hospitals. The newspaper launched in 1990 and is published by Inside Time Limited, a not-for-profit organisation and a wholly owned subsidiary of the New Bridge Foundation, a national charity for prisoners founded in 1956. Editors and contributors involved with the newspaper include Noel "Razor" Smith, Erwin James, Terry Waite, Jonathan Aitken, and Rachel Billington.

== History ==
Founded by Eric McGraw, in December 1990 the first issue of Time (later to become Inside Time) was distributed to all prisons and young offender institutions in the United Kingdom. The quarterly eight page newspaper was launched in the House of Commons and broadcast on BBC Breakfast from Grendon Prison. Ironically, the inspiration for a national newspaper for prisoners came from the Woolf Inquiry into the Strangeways Prison riot that erupted in April 1990. Both Lord Woolf and the late Judge Sir Stephen Tumin concluded that prisoners had inadequate opportunities to air their grievances. For that reason, from the very first issue, the newspaper adopted the mission: 'a voice for prisoners'. Today, Inside Time is published monthly, with 56 pages and receives some 10,000 items of communication each year from prisoners, detainees and patients in special hospitals and their families. Inside Time also provides a website that has more than 400,000 unique visitors each month. Inside Time Limited is a not-for-profit organisation run under the auspices of the New Bridge Foundation.

== Special supplements ==
Inside Time also publishes:

- Inside Information – a comprehensive guide to prisons and prison related services; the book is provided free of charge to all prison libraries.
- Inside Poetry – a collection of poems written by people in prison. Each year a new volume is provided free of charge to all UK prison libraries.
- Inside Justice – a division of Inside Time that investigates potential miscarriages of justice. It is currently funded by charitable donations from the Esmée Fairbairn Foundation, the Newsum Charitable Trust, and the Roddick Foundation.
