= Alfred Robens, Baron Robens of Woldingham =

British trade unionist, industrialist and politician (1910-1999)

The Right Honourable The Lord Robens of Woldingham PC
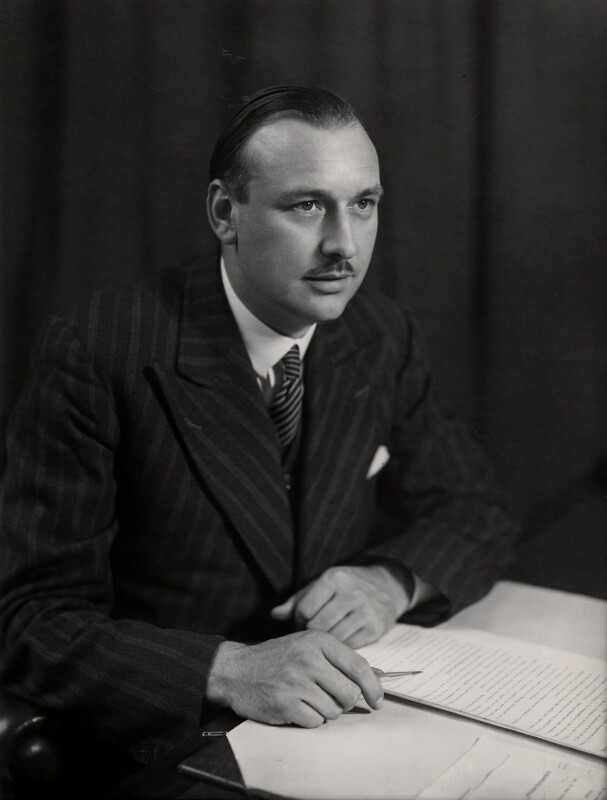
- Robens in 1947

Chair of the National Coal Board
- In office 1961–1971
- Preceded by: Jim Bowman
- Succeeded by: Derek Ezra

Shadow Minister for Labour
- In office 27 November 1956 – November 1960
- Leader: Hugh Gaitskell
- Preceded by: George Brown
- Succeeded by: Frederick Lee

Shadow Foreign Secretary
- In office 15 July 1955 – 27 November 1956
- Leader: Clement Attlee; Hugh Gaitskell
- Preceded by: Position established
- Succeeded by: Aneurin Bevan

Minister of Labour and National Service
- In office 24 April 1951 – 26 October 1951
- Prime Minister: Clement Attlee
- Preceded by: Aneurin Bevan
- Succeeded by: Walter Monckton

Parliamentary Secretary to the Ministry of Fuel and Power
- In office 7 October 1947 – 24 April 1951
- Prime Minister: Clement Attlee
- Preceded by: Hugh Gaitskell
- Succeeded by: Harold Neal

Member of Parliament for Blyth Wansbeck (1945–1950)
- In office 5 July 1945 – 30 October 1960
- Preceded by: Donald Scott
- Succeeded by: Eddie Milne

Personal details
- Born: 18 December 1910 Chorlton-on-Medlock, Lancashire, England
- Died: 27 June 1999 (aged 88) Chertsey, Surrey, England
- Party: Labour (before 1979); Conservative (1979–1999)

Alfred Robens, Baron Robens of Woldingham, PC (18 December 1910 – 27 June 1999) was an English trade unionist, Labour politician and industrialist. His political ambitions, including an aspiration to become Prime Minister, were frustrated, but his energies were diverted into industry: he spent 10 years as Chairman of the National Coal Board, and later – despite the Aberfan disaster – headed a major inquiry which resulted in the Robens Report on occupational health and safety. His outlook was paternalistic; in later life, he moved away from his early socialism towards the Conservative Party. His reputation remains tarnished by his failure to have foreseen and prevented the Aberfan disaster, followed by actions widely regarded as grossly insensitive during the aftermath of the disaster.

== Early life ==
Robens was born in Chorlton-on-Medlock, Manchester, the son of George Robens, a cotton salesman, and Edith Robens (née Anderton). He left school aged 15 (when the minimum school-leaving age was 14) to work as an errand boy. He then joined the Manchester and Salford Co-operative Society as a clerk, becoming a director when he was 22, one of the first worker-directors in the country. He was an official in the Union of Distributive and Allied Workers from 1935 to 1945; certified medically unfit for military service in the Second World War, he was a Manchester City Councillor from 1941 to 1945. He married Eva Powell on 9 September 1936; the couple adopted a son, Alfred (born 1935).

== Politics ==
Following the war, in the Labour landslide victory of 1945, Robens was elected Member of Parliament (MP) for the mining constituency of Wansbeck in Northumberland. He started to rise through the parliamentary ranks, serving in junior posts at the Ministry of Transport (1945–1947) and at the Ministry of Fuel and Power under Hugh Gaitskell. In 1950, following boundary changes, Robens moved to the new constituency of Blyth, later Blyth Valley. He briefly replaced Aneurin Bevan as Minister of Labour and National Service following the former's resignation in protest of National Health Service prescription charges in 1951, until the general election a few months later which the Conservative Party won.

In opposition, Robens continued to rise in the party, being appointed Shadow Foreign Secretary by Clement Attlee while Bevan was indisposed, and he began to be considered as a future candidate for party leader. Robens himself "yearned to become Prime Minister". However, he failed to impress during the Suez Crisis of 1956 because he had been briefed in confidence by the Conservative Prime Minister, Anthony Eden, on the night before the invasion; sworn to secrecy, he was unable to oppose the invasion effectively in the debate in the House of Commons. Furthermore, Gaitskell felt him too left-wing. He was replaced as Shadow Foreign Secretary by Bevan, and felt that his political ambitions had been frustrated.

When Prime Minister Harold Macmillan offered Robens the chairmanship of the National Coal Board (NCB) in 1960, he accepted the role and resigned as MP. A few years later in 1963, Gaitskell died and there was an election for the next leader of the Labour Party; Harold Wilson won, defeating George Brown. Geoffrey Tweedale, writing in the Oxford Dictionary of National Biography, has expressed the view that Robens would have won the election had he persisted in politics. George Brown later wrote in his autobiography that had Robens stood for the election he would not have opposed him, and even if he had, Robens would have defeated him.

== National Coal Board ==
Robens took up his appointment at the NCB in 1961 at a salary believed to be £10,000 a year (which was never increased throughout his ten years in office) and was created a life peer as Baron Robens of Woldingham, of Woldingham in the County of Surrey, on 28 June. Amongst those critical of this sudden elevation were his successor as MP for Blyth, Eddie Milne. Robens's leadership of the NCB was high-handed. He expected unflinching loyalty from colleagues and subordinates alike, and was confrontational with politicians. As chairman he had access to a Daimler with the vehicle registration number "NCB 1", an executive aeroplane (a six-seater De Havilland Dove used to visit the far-flung coalfields) and a flat in Eaton Square. His behaviour earned him the nickname "Old King Coal", a pun on Old King Cole. He threw himself into the job with enthusiasm, visiting pits, arguing with miners at the coalface and developing a deep knowledge of the industry. In 1963 he was invited to deliver the MacMillan Memorial Lecture to the Institution of Engineers and Shipbuilders in Scotland. He chose the subject "Coal – Its Place in the National Economy".

As Chairman of the NCB, Robens oversaw substantial cuts in the mining industry, many of them reflecting market forces and government policies originated before he assumed the post. Although he lobbied to protect the industry, his reputation as a socialist suffered: when he took over as NCB chair there were 698 pits employing 583,000 miners, but by the time he left the post 10 years later there were only 292 pits employing 283,000 miners. For a while Robens had a constructive working relationship with the miners' leader Will Paynter, but he had a combative relationship with the Wilson Labour government. Industrial relations deteriorated during his tenure, and there was an unofficial strike in 1969 that lost £15 million and 2.5 million tonnes of coal as a result of walkouts at 140 of the 307 NCB collieries.

Robens expressed concern at the poor occupational health and safety record of the coal industry, and championed campaigns to reduce accidents and to counter chronic occupational diseases such as pneumoconiosis. Although the number of fatal and serious accidents fell by over 60% during his tenure, there was also a fall in the workforce of over 50%, from 583,000 to 283,000.

=== Aberfan disaster ===
The largest single blow to his reputation came from his reaction to the catastrophic 1966 industrial accident at Aberfan, in the Taff Valley, South Wales. On the morning of 21 October, a massive spoil heap from the nearby Merthyr Vale Colliery collapsed onto the village of Aberfan, burying 20 houses and the Pantglas Junior School in a landslide, 30 ft (9.1 m) deep, of water-saturated slurry that killed 116 schoolchildren and 28 adults.

On the day of the disaster Robens was set to be installed as the first Chancellor of the new University of Surrey. He completed the ceremony before going to Aberfan, and did not arrive until evening the day following the disaster. This proved to be controversial, compounded by NCB staff who had falsely informed the Minister of Power, Richard Marsh, that Robens was at Aberfan. It was always his policy to send the most senior mining engineer to the scene of a disaster to coordinate rescue operations.

Speaking to the media on the Sunday two days after the disaster, Robens was concerned that the initial shock and sorrow might give way to anger, possibly directed towards the men who worked at the top of the spoil heaps. To avoid this, he said that those men could not have foreseen what happened. A television interview, during which he made that comment, proved to be unacceptable for broadcasting, owing to the atmospheric conditions; instead, the interviewer broadcast a paraphrase of the interview that wrongly made it seem that Robens had claimed that no one in the NCB could have foreseen the disaster. This was later taken by the Aberfan disaster enquiry to imply that the Board was contesting liability, notwithstanding the 19th-century case of Rylands v Fletcher which meant that the Board had absolute liability for damage caused by a 'dangerous escape' of material. Conversely, in a later interview Robens claimed that the disaster had been caused by "natural unknown springs" beneath the tip; but evidence emerged that the existence of these springs was common knowledge.

The report of the Edmund-Davies Tribunal, which inquired into the disaster, was highly critical of the NCB and Robens. He had proposed to appear at the outset of the inquiry to admit the NCB's full responsibility for the disaster, but the Chairman of the Tribunal advised him that this would not be necessary. In the event, when it was clear that his earlier comments to reporters had been misinterpreted at the Tribunal as a denial of responsibility, he offered to appear at the inquiry to clarify his view. He conceded that the NCB was at fault, an admission which would have rendered much of the inquiry unnecessary had it been made at the outset, notwithstanding the advice of Lord Edmund-Davies that his appearance was not necessary. After the report was published in August 1967, Robens wrote to Marsh, the Minister of Power, offering his resignation; this was rejected by him and by the Prime Minister Wilson, although several cabinet members argued strongly that Robens ought to be removed.

There have been allegations that the resignation offer was "bogus" and Robens had been assured that it would not be accepted. According to Ronald Dearing, then a part-time member of the NCB, Richard Marsh was advised that Robens was "taking the coal industry through a period of painful contraction without big strikes" and the strong support for him within the coal industry and the union movement were crucial to the decision to retain him. When Robens told a meeting of the full Board that he had offered his resignation, there was surprise and consternation; Cecil King, a part-time member of the Board, rose to his feet and told Robens that in doing so he had acted correctly.

In the wake of the disaster, Robens was asked that the NCB should fund the removal of the remaining tips from Aberfan. He was advised, however, that the cost of doing so would have obliged the NCB to exceed its borrowing limits, set by the government. He had acceded to a request from the bereaved mothers of Aberfan to meet them to hear their views, and he was received by them with courtesy. Eventually the cost was met partly by the Board and partly by the Government, with a levy made on the charitable Aberfan Disaster Fund.

The Trustees of the Disaster Fund, which had been raised by public appeal, were put under "intolerable pressure" to make a contribution of £150,000 (equivalent to £2,400,000 in 2025) to cover the cost of removing the tips – an action that was "unquestionably unlawful" under charity law – but the Charity Commission took no action to protect the Fund from this misappropriation of funds.

There is no evidence that prosecution for corporate manslaughter was considered at the time. Robens was exonerated by the official history of the NCB but he remains condemned in other quarters.

== Robens Report ==
In 1969, Robens was selected by Barbara Castle to chair a committee on workplace health and safety. This led to the 1972 Robens Report which controversially championed the idea of self-regulation by employers. The Report itself led to the Health and Safety at Work etc. Act 1974 and the creation of the Health and Safety Commission and the Health and Safety Executive.

== Later life ==
Following the Conservative victory in the 1970 general election, Robens found the new administration's distaste for nationalisation at odds with his own rather paternalistic views. He fell into conflict with Prime Minister Edward Heath and Minister of State for Industry Sir John Eden. Robens left the NCB in 1971 but always insisted that his tenure was a success.

Robens had become a director of the Bank of England in 1966 and a member of the board of directors of Times Newspapers in 1967. He was Chairman of Vickers from 1971 to 1979, opposing the Labour plans for nationalisation that led to the Aircraft and Shipbuilding Industries Act 1977. He was Chairman of Johnson Matthey from 1971 to 1983, and a director of Trust House Forte and several other companies. His lifestyle was increasingly at odds with his socialist beginnings and by 1979, he had become aligned with the Conservative Party.

He left public life in 1982, retiring with his wife (who died in 2008) to Laleham Abbey in Surrey, once the home of the 7th Earl of Lucan. Robens suffered the first of two debilitating strokes in 1992, and died in 1999 aged 88.

== In folk music ==
Robens's period at the National Coal Board was mentioned in the folk songs of the period. Ed Pickford, who was a miner in the Durham Coalfield, was highly critical of Robens: his song The Pound a Week Rise criticises the low wages paid to coal miners during Robens's reign, and his song One Miner's Life refers to the widespread pit closures. Jock Purdon, a miner who was made redundant on the closure of Harraton Colliery in Durham, wrote the song Farewell to Cotia about the migration of redundant miners across the country and particularly to Nottinghamshire, which he referred to as "Robens's promised land". The Pound a Week Rise has subsequently been covered by various folk and left-wing artists, including Dick Gaughan and Rathkeltaír.

== Other public appointments ==
- Chairman of the Foundation on Automation and Employment (1962);
- Chairman of the Engineering Industries Council (1976–80);
- Member of the royal commission on trade unions and employers' associations (1965–68);
- Member of the National Economic Development Council (1976–80);
- Council of Manchester Business School:
  - Member;
  - Chairman (1970–79);
- Chairman of the court of governors of the London School of Economics (1965);
- Chairman of the board of governors of Guy's Hospital (1965–74).

== Honours ==
- In 1951 he was sworn in as a Member of His Majesty's Most Honourable Privy Council. This gave him the Honorific Prefix "The Right Honourable" and after Ennoblement the Post Nominal Letters "PC" for Life.
- He was awarded an Honorary Fellowship by the Institution of Heating and Ventilating Engineers in 1962.
- He delivered the annual Hugh Miller MacMillan Memorial Lecture at the Institution of Engineers and Shipbuilders in Scotland in 1964.
- He was awarded the Honorary degree of Doctor of Laws (LL.D) by the University of Leicester in 1966.
- He was awarded the Honorary degree of Doctor of the University (D.Univ) by the University of Surrey on 26 January 1977.
- He was elected as an Honorary Fellow of the Institution of Mechanical Engineers (FIMechE) in 1977.
- He was awarded an Honorary Fellowship by the University of Manchester Institute of Science and Technology.

== Sources ==
- Ashworth, William & Pegg, Mark (1986). History of the British Coal Industry, Vol. 5: The Nationalised Industry. Oxford: Oxford University Press. ISBN 0-19-828295-8.
- Cullen, William (1996). "The development of safety legislation" (PDF). Royal Academy of Engineering and Royal Society of Edinburgh Lecture. Royal Society of Edinburgh. Archived from the original (PDF) on 27 March 2009.
- Evans, Harold (1978). Vickers: Against the Odds, 1956–1977. Hodder & Stoughton. ISBN 0-340-23434-2.
- Gormley, J. (1982). Battered Cherub. London: H Hamilton. ISBN 0-241-10754-7.
- McLean, I. (5 January 1997). "Heartless bully who added to agony of Aberfan: Thirty years on, documents reveal how Coal Board chief Lord Robens dodged the blame for the disaster". The Observer. p. 12.
- McLean, I.; Johnes, M. (2000). Aberfan: Government and Disasters. Welsh Academic Press. ISBN 1-86057-033-X.
- Robens, A. (1970). Human Engineering. London: Jonathan Cape. ISBN 0-224-61837-7.
- Robens, A. (1972a). Ten Year Stint. London: Cassell. ISBN 0-304-93874-2.
- Robens, Alfred (1972b). Safety and Health at Work: Report of the Committee, 1970-72. The Stationery Office. ISBN 978-0-11-360826-3.
- Robens, A. (1977). Managing Great Britain Limited. Ashridge Management College. ISBN 0-903542-14-5.
- Simpson, R. C. (1973). "Safety and Health at Work: Report of the Robens Committee 1970-72". Modern Law Review. 36 (2): 192–198.
- Tweedale, G. (2008). "Robens, Alfred, Baron Robens of Woldingham (1910–1999)". Oxford Dictionary of National Biography (online ed.). Oxford University Press. (subscription, Wikipedia Library access or UK public library membership required)
- Obituaries:
  - The Times, 29 June 1999, p. 23
  - The Guardian, 28 June 1999, p. 18
  - The Independent, 29 June 1999, p. 6

Parliament of the United Kingdom
Preceded by Donald Scott	Member of Parliament for Wansbeck; 1945–1950	Constituency abolished
New constituency	Member of Parliament for Blyth; 1950–1960	Succeeded by Eddie Milne
Political offices
Preceded by Nye Bevan	Minister of Labour and National Service; 1951	Succeeded by Walter Monckton
New office	Shadow Foreign Secretary; 1955–1956	Succeeded by Aneurin Bevan
Trade union offices
Preceded by Jim Bowman	Chair of the National Coal Board; 1961–1971	Succeeded by Derek Ezra
