= 2013 Northumberland County Council election =

2013 UK local government election

← 2008	2 May 2013	2017 →

All 67 seats to Northumberland County Council 34 seats needed for a majority
- Turnout: 33.7%
	First party	Second party
Party	Labour	Conservative
Last election	17	17
Seats won	32	21
Seat change	▲15	▲4
Popular vote	29,631	25,354
Percentage	35.8%	30.7%
	Third party	Fourth party
Party	Liberal Democrats	Independent
Last election	26	7
Seats won	11	3
Seat change	▼15	▼4
Popular vote	17,035	4,881
Percentage	20.6%	5.9%
- Map of the results of the 2013 local election.
Control of Council before election
No overall control
Control of Council after election
No overall control

Elections to Northumberland County Council were held on 2 May 2013. The full council was up for election, with each successful candidate serving a four-year term of office, expiring in 2017.

The council remained in no overall control with the Labour Party becoming the largest party, holding 32 out of 67 seats on the council. Of the remaining 35 seats on the council, the Conservative Party won 21 seats, the Liberal Democrats won 11 seats and Independents won 3 seats.

== Results ==
Northumberland County Council election, 2013
Party	Seats	Gains	Losses	Net gain/loss	Seats %	Votes %	Votes	+/−
Labour	32				47.76	35.07	29,793	
Conservative	21				31.34	30.74	26,123	
Liberal Democrats	11				16.42	21.15	17,964	
Independent	3				4.48	5.75	4,881	
UKIP	0				0.00	6.79	5,764	
Green	0				0.00	0.50	424	

The overall turnout was 34.03% with a total of 84,949 valid votes cast. A total of 726 ballots were rejected.

== Council Composition ==
Following the election, the composition of the council was:

↓
32	21	11	3
Labour	Conservative	Liberal Democrat	IND

IND - Independent

== Ward results ==
.

=== Alnwick ===
Alnwick (2 seats)
Party	Candidate	Votes	%
Conservative	Gordon Castle	1,128	20.03
Liberal Democrats	Lydia Heather Cairns	1,008	17.90
Liberal Democrats	Clare Margaret Mills	929	16.50
Conservative	Bruce Hewison	767	13.62
UKIP	Michael John Weatheritt	594	10.55
UKIP	Margaret Weatheritt	482	8.56
Labour	William Grisdale	461	8.19
Labour	Mary Pidcock	262	4.65
Majority		79	1.40
Turnout		5,631	37.2
Conservative hold			
Liberal Democrats hold			

=== Amble ===
Amble (1 seat)
Party	Candidate	Votes	%
Labour	George Robert Arckless	575	69.87
Conservative	Peter Robinson	162	19.68
Liberal Democrats	Roger Cashmore	86	10.45
Majority		413	50.19
Turnout		823	
Labour hold			

=== Amble West with Warkworth ===
Amble West with Warkworth (1 seat)
Party	Candidate	Votes	%
Conservative	Amble West with Warkworth	432	27.73
Liberal Democrats	Juliet Hedda Pörksen	431	27.66
UKIP	Leslie George Herbert Bilboe	260	16.69
Independent	Dorothy Ann Burke	222	14.25
Labour	Paul Claridge	213	13.67
Majority		1	0.07
Turnout		1,558	45.5
Conservative hold			

=== Ashington Central ===
Ashington Central (1 seat)
Party	Candidate	Votes	%
Labour	Thomas Sinclair Wilson	795	90.34
Conservative	John Ridley Wearmouth	85	9.66
Majority		710	80.68
Turnout		880	23.87
Labour hold			

=== Bamburgh ===
Bamburgh (1 seat)
Party	Candidate	Votes	%
Conservative	John Crawford Woodman	813	56.85
Liberal Democrats	David John Holwell	463	32.38
Labour	Nicola Morrison	154	10.77
Majority		350	24.47
Turnout		1,430	39.9
Conservative hold			

=== Bedlington Central ===
Bedlington Central (1 seat)
Party	Candidate	Votes	%
Labour	Alyson Wallace	606	57.55
Liberal Democrats	Arthur Holland Pegg	234	22.22
Conservative	Paul Robert Aynsley	213	20.23
Majority		372	35.33
Turnout		1,053	28.64
Labour hold			

=== Bedlington East ===
Bedlington East (1 seat)
Party	Candidate	Votes	%
Labour	Valerie Tyler	701	85.28
Conservative	Edna Elizabeth Rixon	74	9.00
Liberal Democrats	Joan Carol Tebbutt	47	5.72
Majority		627	76.28
Turnout		822	23.84
Labour hold			

=== Bedlington West ===
Bedlington West (1 seat)
Party	Candidate	Votes	%
Labour	Terence Johnstone	530	46.99
Independent	Malcolm Robinson	286	25.35
Conservative	Tracy Aynsley	166	14.72
Liberal Democrats	Anthony Barrett	146	12.94
Majority		244	21.64
Turnout		1,128	30.43
Labour hold			

=== Bellingham ===
Bellingham (1 seat)
Party	Candidate	Votes	%
Conservative	John Robert Riddle	867	69.03
Labour	Alexandra Norah Richards	228	18.15
Liberal Democrats	Angus David McCraken	161	12.82
Majority		639	50.88
Turnout		1,256	39.57
Conservative hold			

=== Berwick East ===
Berwick East (1 seat)
Party	Candidate	Votes	%
Liberal Democrats	James Edward Smith	342	45.18
Conservative	Georgina Emma Rowley Hill	253	33.42
Labour	John Paul Hewit	162	21.40
Majority		89	11.76
Turnout		757	21.80
Liberal Democrats hold			

=== Berwick North ===
Berwick North (1 seat)
Party	Candidate	Votes	%
Liberal Democrats	Gavin William Jones	456	36.6
Independent	Brian Alexander Douglas	365	29.29
Conservative	Thomas Reginald Forrester	318	25.52
Labour	Keith Trobe	107	8.59
Majority		91	7.31
Turnout		1,246	37.8
Liberal Democrats hold			

=== Berwick West with Ord ===
Berwick West with Ord (1 seat)
Party	Candidate	Votes	%
Liberal Democrats	Elizabeth Isabel Hunter	558	57.76
Conservative	John William Stephenson	296	30.64
Labour	Anthony George Reay	112	11.60
Majority		262	27.12
Turnout		966	31.90
Liberal Democrats hold			

=== Bothal ===
Bothal (1 seat)
Party	Candidate	Votes	%
Labour	Lynne Grimshaw	666	54.37
Liberal Democrats	Simon Luke Reed	479	39.10
Conservative	Jack Alexander Gebhard	80	6.53
Majority		187	15.27
Turnout		1,225	34.33
Labour hold			

=== Bywell ===
Bywell (1 seat)
Party	Candidate	Votes	%
Independent	Paul Kelly	559	38.66
Conservative	Fiona Mary Hunter	423	29.26
Liberal Democrats	Andrew Haddon	232	16.04
Labour	John Robert Temple	232	16.04
Majority		136	9.41
Turnout		1,446	40.52
Independent hold			

=== Choppington ===
Choppington (1 seat)
Party	Candidate	Votes	%
Labour	David Ledger	688	81.90
Conservative	Rachel Elizabeth Moore	152	18.10
Majority		536	63.80
Turnout		840	22.86
Labour hold			

=== College ===
College (1 seat)
Party	Candidate	Votes	%
Labour	James Sawyer	878	90.70
Conservative	Charlotte Elizabeth Peacock	90	9.30
Majority		788	81.40
Turnout		968	25.50
Labour hold			

=== Corbridge ===
Corbridge (1 seat)
Party	Candidate	Votes	%
Conservative	Jean Barbara Fearon	704	61.06
Labour	Gillian Richardson	286	24.80
Liberal Democrats	Philip Ronald Latham	163	14.14
Majority		418	36.26
Turnout		1,153	33.32
Conservative hold			

=== Cowpen ===
Cowpen (1 seat)
Party	Candidate	Votes	%
Labour	Susan Davey	483	52.16
UKIP	Barry William Elliott	380	41.04
Conservative	Connor Graham Rumble	32	3.45
Liberal Democrats	Alisdair Lindsey Gibbs-Barton	31	3.35
Majority		103	11.12
Turnout		926	28.20
Labour hold			

=== Cramlington East ===
Cramlington East (1 seat)
Party	Candidate	Votes	%
Labour	Ian Carr Fry Swithenbank	588	78.19
Conservative	Anne Charlotte Waggitt	83	11.04
Liberal Democrats	Brenda Brechany	81	10.77
Majority		505	67.15
Turnout		752	24.34
Labour hold			

=== Cramlington Eastfield ===
Cramlington Eastfield (1 seat)
Party	Candidate	Votes	%
Labour	Laura Barbara Pidcock	665	49.04
Liberal Democrats	Barrie Crowther	428	31.56
Conservative	Christopher Wallis	263	19.40
Majority		237	17.48
Turnout		1,356	32.16
Labour hold			

=== Cramlington North ===
Cramlington North (1 seat)
Party	Candidate	Votes	%
Conservative	Wayne Daley	1,127	78.59
Labour	Martin John Wright	267	18.62
Liberal Democrats	Sandra Armstrong	40	2.79
Majority		860	59.97
Turnout		1,434	34.86
Conservative hold			

=== Cramlington South East ===
Cramlington South East (1 seat)
Party	Candidate	Votes	%
Labour	Allan Hepple	742	47.26
Independent	William Bowers	300	19.11
Liberal Democrats	Thomas Brechany	280	17.83
Conservative	Lynn Rixon	248	15.80
Majority		442	28.15
Turnout		1,570	40.21
Labour hold			

=== Cramlington Village ===
Cramlington Village (1 seat)
Party	Candidate	Votes	%
Labour	Kathleen Olivia Graham	492	37.13
Liberal Democrats	Alan Rockcliffe Armstrong	374	28.23
Conservative	Christopher Patrick Desmond Dorman-O'Gowan	317	23.92
Independent	Susan Mary Bryce Johnston	142	10.72
Majority		118	8.90
Turnout		1,325	36.65
Labour hold			

=== Cramlington West ===
Cramlington West (1 seat)
Party	Candidate	Votes	%
Conservative	Barry Malcolm Flux	719	54.89
Labour	Ian Ayres	531	40.53
Liberal Democrats	Michael Robert Gerard Emmett	60	4.58
Majority		188	14.36
Turnout		1,310	32.52
Conservative hold			

=== Croft ===
Croft (1 seat)
Party	Candidate	Votes	%
Labour	Kathleen Nisbet	582	71.24
Independent	Vincent Coils	114	13.95
Conservative	Sheila O'Sullivan	62	7.59
Liberal Democrats	Sylvia Calvert	59	7.22
Majority		468	57.29
Turnout		817	23.76
Labour hold			

=== Dudridge Bay ===
Dudridge Bay (1 seat)
Party	Candidate	Votes	%
Labour	Scott James Dickinson	786	63.13
Conservative	Daniel John Hedley	287	23.05
Liberal Democrats	Carole Lindsay Arkley	172	13.82
Majority		499	40.08
Turnout		1,245	29.90
Labour hold			

=== Haltwhistle ===
Haltwhistle (1 seat)
Party	Candidate	Votes	%
Conservative	James Ian Hutchinson	651	43.03
Labour	Eric David Watson	554	36.61
UKIP	Graham Edward Young	228	15.07
Liberal Democrats	Niall Alasdair Munro Deas	80	5.29
Majority		97	6.42
Turnout		1,513	42.06
Conservative hold			

=== Hartley ===
Hartley (1 seat)
Party	Candidate	Votes	%
Labour	Susan Elizabeth Dungworth	947	58.03
Liberal Democrats	Anita Cynthia Romer	423	25.92
Conservative	Daniel James Carr	262	16.05
Majority		524	32.11
Turnout		1,632	41.43
Labour hold			

=== Haydon & Hadrian ===
Haydon & Hadrian (1 seat)
Party	Candidate	Votes	%
Liberal Democrats	Alan Sharp	696	45.52
Conservative	William Joseph Green	464	30.35
UKIP	Melanie Hurst	205	13.41
Labour	Mary Annette McGlade Wright	164	10.72
Majority		232	15.17
Turnout		1,529	44.40
Liberal Democrats hold			

=== Haydon ===
Haydon (1 seat)
Party	Candidate	Votes	%
Labour	Brian Gallacher	857	72.69
Liberal Democrats	Andrew Rupert McGregor	249	21.12
Conservative	Nicola Ann Bawn	73	6.19
Majority		608	51.57
Turnout		1,179	32.58
Labour hold			

=== Hexham Central with Acomb ===
Hexham Central with Acomb (1 seat)
Party	Candidate	Votes	%
Conservative	Terence Robson	755	48.46
Labour	Jane Caroline Wrigley	537	34.47
UKIP	Jason Osvaldo Fiori	177	11.36
Liberal Democrats	Peter John Arnold	89	5.71
Majority		218	13.99
Turnout		1,558	44.41
Conservative hold			

=== Hexham East ===
Hexham East (1 seat)
Party	Candidate	Votes	%
Conservative	Catherine Robson Homer	623	46.67
Labour	Lorna Jane Boyd	300	22.47
UKIP	Alan Philipson	207	15.50
Liberal Democrats	Judith Elizabeth Lloyd	205	15.36
Majority		323	24.20
Turnout		1,335	39.17
Conservative hold			

=== Hexham West ===
Hexham West (1 seat)
Party	Candidate	Votes	%
Conservative	Colin Cessford	848	48.34
Liberal Democrats	Derek Kennedy	540	30.79
Labour	David Crockit	261	14.88
UKIP	Zoe Philipson	105	5.99
Majority		308	17.55
Turnout		1,754	52.49
Conservative hold			

=== Hirst ===
Hirst (1 seat)
Party	Candidate	Votes	%
Labour	Kenneth Parry	518	60.73
Independent	Pauline Thompson	306	35.87
Conservative	Richard Wearmouth	29	3.40
Majority		212	24.86
Turnout		853	22.76
Labour hold			

=== Holywell ===
Holywell (1 seat)
Party	Candidate	Votes	%
Labour	Bernard Pidcock	733	46.25
Liberal Democrats	Robert Marshall Nixon	449	28.33
Independent	Robert Watson	282	17.79
Conservative	Simon Troy Hartland	121	7.63
Majority		284	17.92
Turnout		1,585	37.26
Labour hold			

=== Humshaugh ===
Humshaugh (1 seat)
Party	Candidate	Votes	%
Conservative	Rupert McLure Gibson	807	66.80
Labour	Milo Jasper Barnett	264	21.85
Liberal Democrats	Paul Steven Harrison	137	11.34
Majority		543	44.95
Turnout		1,208	35.94
Conservative hold			

=== Isabella ===
Isabella (1 seat)
Party	Candidate	Votes	%
Labour	Gordon Webb	649	80.42
Liberal Democrats	Gordon Calvert	85	10.53
Conservative	Aaron Spence	73	9.05
Majority		564	69.89
Turnout		807	24.19
Labour hold			

=== Kitty Brewster ===
Kitty Brewster (1 seat)
Party	Candidate	Votes	%
Labour	James Grant Davey	685	73.58
Conservative	Katherine McVicar	131	14.07
Liberal Democrats	Walter Rickerby	115	12.35
Majority		554	59.51
Turnout		931	22.80
Labour hold			

=== Longhorsley ===
Longhorsley (1 seat)
Party	Candidate	Votes	%
Labour	Hugh Glen Howard Sanderson	994	72.35
UKIP	David Malcolm Cox	152	11.06
Labour	Otis Gilbert	127	9.24
Liberal Democrats	Charles Jevon	101	7.35
Majority		842	61.29
Turnout		1,374	42.7
Labour hold			

=== Longhoughton ===
Longhoughton (1 seat)
Party	Candidate	Votes	%
Independent	John Anthony Taylor	705	51.01
Conservative	David James Campbell Rixon	315	22.79
Independent	Ian James Ramsey Sutherland	184	13.32
UKIP	Geoffrey Watson	178	12.88
Majority		390	28.22
Turnout		1,382	43.00
Independent hold			

=== Lynemouth ===
Lynemouth (1 seat)
Party	Candidate	Votes	%
Labour	Milburn Irving Douglas	661	61.60
Liberal Democrats	Barry Kent	342	31.87
Conservative	Jeremy Lewis Wilcock	70	6.53
Majority		319	29.73
Turnout		1,073	32.20
Labour hold			

=== Morpeth Kirkhill ===
Morpeth Kirkhill (1 seat)
Party	Candidate	Votes	%
Liberal Democrats	Andrew Tebbutt	710	45.75
Conservative	David Herne	464	29.90
Labour	Adrian Martin James Slassor	378	24.35
Majority		246	15.85
Turnout		1,552	38.30
Liberal Democrats hold			

=== Morpeth North ===
Morpeth North (1 seat)
Party	Candidate	Votes	%
Conservative	David Lee Bawn	523	31.79
Green	Nicholas Francis Best	424	25.78
Liberal Democrats	Kenneth Brown	385	23.40
Labour	Colin Taylor	313	19.03
Majority		99	6.01
Turnout		1,645	43.80
Conservative hold			

=== Morpeth Stobhill ===
Morpeth Stobhill (1 seat)
Party	Candidate	Votes	%
Liberal Democrats	Ian Paul Lindley	553	37.57
Conservative	John Ace Beynon	472	32.06
Labour	Debra Belinda Davies	447	30.37
Majority		81	5.51
Turnout		1,472	40.20
Liberal Democrats hold			

=== Newbiggin Central & East ===
Newbiggin Central & East (1 seat)
Party	Candidate	Votes	%
Labour	Elizabeth Mary Simpson	751	67.29
Liberal Democrats	James Alan Thompson	265	23.75
Conservative	Dorothy Anne Wonnacott	100	8.96
Majority		486	43.54
Turnout		1,116	30.18
Labour hold			

=== Newsham ===
Newsham (1 seat)
Party	Candidate	Votes	%
Labour	Deirdre Campbell	441	45.94
UKIP	Richard William Hall	352	36.67
Liberal Democrats	Elizabeth Marina Vuyk	112	11.66
Conservative	Nicola Swinburn	55	5.73
Majority		89	9.27
Turnout		960	27.65
Labour hold			

=== Norham & Islandshires ===
Norham & Islandshires (1 seat)
Party	Candidate	Votes	%
Liberal Democrats	Richard John Douglas Watkin	808	54.85
Conservative	Steven John Purvis	533	36.19
Labour	Sandra Dawn Dickinson	132	8.96
Majority		275	18.66
Turnout		1,473	42.10
Liberal Democrats hold			

=== Pegswood ===
Pegswood (1 seat)
Party	Candidate	Votes	%
Labour	Alan George Sambrook	510	40.38
Liberal Democrats	David George Woodard	323	25.58
Conservative	Sheila Luck	226	17.89
UKIP	Muriel Brown	204	16.15
Majority		187	14.80
Turnout		1,263	32.10
Labour hold			

=== Plessey ===
Plessey (1 seat)
Party	Candidate	Votes	%
Liberal Democrats	Jeffrey Stewart Reid	580	42.21
Labour	Gordon Thomas Knox	501	36.46
UKIP	Revell Cornell	254	18.49
Conservative	Karl David McLean	39	2.84
Majority		79	5.75
Turnout		1,374	39.24
Liberal Democrats hold			

=== Ponteland East & Stannington ===
Ponteland East & Stannington (1 seat)
Party	Candidate	Votes	%
Conservative	Eileen Armstrong	896	83.19
UKIP	John Collin Dickinson	181	16.81
Majority		715	66.38
Turnout		1,077	33.43
Conservative hold			

=== Ponteland North ===
Ponteland North (1 seat)
Party	Candidate	Votes	%
Conservative	Richard Dodd	Uncontested	
Conservative hold			

=== Ponteland South with Heddon ===
Ponteland South with Heddon (1 seat)
Party	Candidate	Votes	%
Conservative	Peter Alan Jackson	836	81.40
Liberal Democrats	Ian Shepherd Sotheran	191	18.60
Majority		645	62.80
Turnout		1,027	30.72
Conservative hold			

=== Ponteland West ===
Ponteland West (1 seat)
Party	Candidate	Votes	%
Conservative	Veronica Jones	907	80.48
UKIP	David Nicholson	220	19.52
Majority		687	60.96
Turnout		1,127	34.51
Conservative hold			

=== Prudhoe North ===
Prudhoe North (1 seat)
Party	Candidate	Votes	%
Labour	Eileen Burt	587	49.12
UKIP	Alan Keith Piper	300	25.10
Conservative	Gerald Bernard Price	257	21.51
Liberal Democrats	John Michael Womersley Williams	51	4.27
Majority		287	24.02
Turnout		1,195	27.54
Labour hold			

=== Prudhoe South ===
Prudhoe South (1 seat)
Party	Candidate	Votes	%
Labour	Anthony William Reid	549	52.74
UKIP	Geraldine Margaret Welton	264	25.36
Conservative	Jade Marie Scott	179	17.19
Liberal Democrats	Darren William Levitt	49	4.71
Majority		285	27.38
Turnout		1,041	26.15
Labour hold			

=== Rothbury ===
Rothbury (1 seat)
Party	Candidate	Votes	%
Liberal Democrats	Steven Christopher Bridgett	1,544	70.86
Conservative	Brian Hesler	540	24.78
Labour	Thelma Morse	95	4.36
Majority		1,004	46.08
Turnout		2,179	54.20
Liberal Democrats hold			

=== Seaton with Newbiggin West ===
Seaton with Newbiggin West (1 seat)
Party	Candidate	Votes	%
Labour	James Aidan Lang	842	78.33
UKIP	Gary James Leighton	120	11.16
Liberal Democrats	Malcolm Peden	71	6.60
Conservative	Timothy James Nichol	42	3.91
Majority		722	67.17
Turnout		1,075	29.55
Labour hold			

=== Seghill with Seaton Delaval ===
Seghill with Seaton Delaval (1 seat)
Party	Candidate	Votes	%
Labour	Margaret Evelyn Richards	840	73.23
Conservative	Alastair John Ion	181	15.78
Liberal Democrats	Anna Jane Reid	126	10.99
Majority		659	57.45
Turnout		1,147	28.20
Labour hold			

=== Shilbottle ===
Shilbottle (1 seat)
Party	Candidate	Votes	%
Conservative	Trevor Norman Thorne	765	45.40
Labour	Brenda Trobe	476	28.25
UKIP	John Anderson Curry	342	20.30
Liberal Democrats	Gregah Alan Roughead	102	6.05
Majority		289	17.15
Turnout		1,685	41.90
Conservative hold			

=== Sleekburn ===
Sleekburn (1 seat)
Party	Candidate	Votes	%
Labour	John James Gobin	498	57.31
Liberal Democrats	Mark David Owen	310	35.67
Conservative	David Gavin Moffatt	61	7.02
Majority		188	21.64
Turnout		869	16.51
Labour hold			

=== South Blyth ===
South Blyth (1 seat)
Party	Candidate	Votes	%
Liberal Democrats	Lesley Jennifer Rickerby	551	46.11
UKIP	Peter Potts	287	24.02
Labour	Heidrun Hedwig Knox	278	23.26
Conservative	Jamie Wyatt	79	6.61
Majority		264	22.09
Turnout		1,195	
Liberal Democrats hold			

=== South Tynedale ===
South Tynedale (1 seat)
Party	Candidate	Votes	%
Conservative	Colin William Horncastle	1,069	71.41
Labour	Catherine Anne Hedley	310	20.71
Liberal Democrats	Stuart Alan Rowlands	118	7.88
Majority		759	50.70
Turnout		1,497	38.23
Conservative hold			

=== Stakeford ===
Stakeford (1 seat)
Party	Candidate	Votes	%
Labour	Julie Denise Foster	878	78.32
Conservative	Chris Galley	243	21.68
Majority		635	56.64
Turnout		1,121	30.01
Labour hold			

=== Stocksfield & Broomhaugh ===
Stocksfield & Broomhaugh (1 seat)
Party	Candidate	Votes	%
Independent	Patricia Anne Mary Dale	1,416	73.10
Conservative	Paul Vickers	344	17.76
Labour	Karen Louise Pollock	177	9.14
Majority		1,072	55.34
Turnout		1,937	48.62
Independent hold			

=== Wensleydale ===
Wensleydale (1 seat)
Party	Candidate	Votes	%
Labour	Eileen Cartie	650	69.52
Liberal Democrats	Penelope Anne Reid	204	21.82
Conservative	Margaret Mary Ion	81	8.66
Majority		446	47.70
Turnout		935	
Labour hold			

=== Wooler ===
Wooler (1 seat)
Party	Candidate	Votes	%
Conservative	Anthony Harkness Murray	850	64.25
UKIP	Gavin William Thomas Egdell	272	20.56
Liberal Democrats	Rosemary Cott	110	8.31
Labour	David Buchanan Williams	91	6.88
Majority		578	43.69
Turnout		1,323	38.80
Conservative hold			
