= Ian Levy =

British Conservative politician (born 1966)

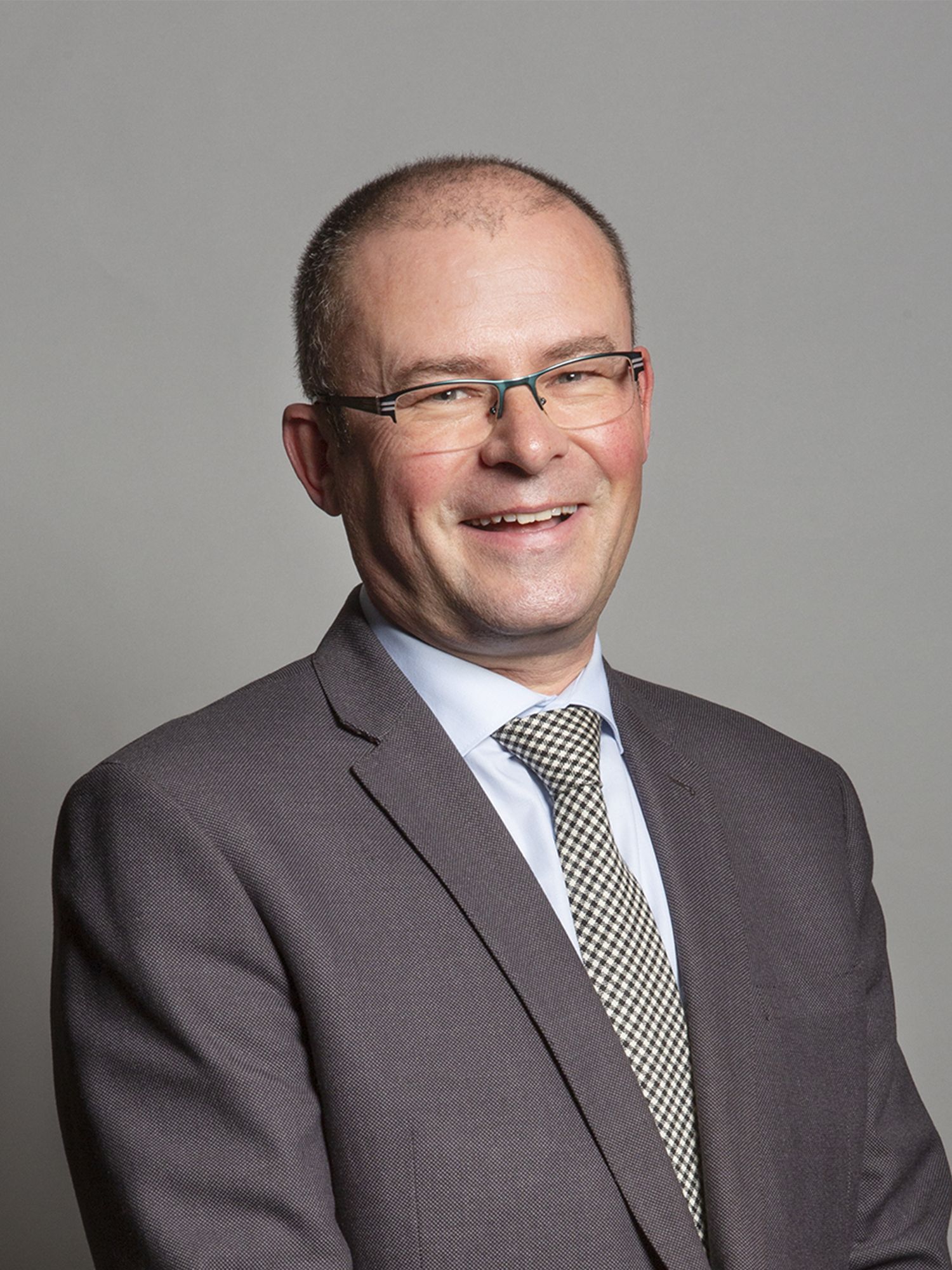
- Official portrait, 2019

Member of Parliament for Blyth Valley
- In office 12 December 2019 – 30 May 2024
- Preceded by: Ronnie Campbell
- Succeeded by: Constituency abolished

Personal details
- Born: 14 February 1966 (age 60)
- Party: Conservative
- Website: www.ianlevy.org.uk

Ian Levy (born 14 February 1966) is a British Conservative Party politician who served as Member of Parliament (MP) for Blyth Valley from the 2019 general election until the seat's abolition in 2024. He was the only Conservative to represent Blyth Valley since the constituency was created in 1950. He served as a Parliamentary Private Secretary (PPS) in the Ministry of Defence from 2022 until the general election, in which he failed to win the new seat of Cramlington and Killingworth. Before this, Levy was a PPS in the Cabinet Office.

== Early life and career ==
Levy is of Jewish descent. He left school at the age of 16 to become a grave digger. Prior to his election, Levy had worked as a healthcare assistant on an inpatient mental health rehabilitation ward in St Nicholas Hospital, Newcastle upon Tyne for over 28 years.

== Parliamentary career ==
He first contested the Blyth Valley constituency at the 2017 general election, in which incumbent Labour MP Ronnie Campbell held his seat with a majority of 7,915. Levy was subsequently elected for the constituency at the 2019 general election with a majority of 712 votes over Labour candidate Susan Dungworth. He was the first Conservative to represent the constituency since its creation in 1950. It had previously been a safe Labour seat. After his election, he was accused of misleading the public, when the Nursing Times reported his social media posts from the campaign, in which he said he had worked as a mental health nurse. The posts were later amended. Cumbria, Northumberland, Tyne and Wear NHS Foundation Trust confirmed he had worked as a healthcare assistant. At that time the term "nurse" was not legally protected so his posts had not violated the Nurses Registration Act 1919.

Levy campaigned on returning passenger railway services to the area and for a relief road in Blyth, which is supported by Transport for the North and other major highways improvements. Blyth's railway station had closed in 1964 as part of the Beeching cuts. Having begun development during the subsequent government, Blyth Bebside railway station opened in October 2025.

Levy won the Newcomer of the Year award at The Spectator Parliamentarian of the Year Awards.

In October 2020, Levy voted against a Labour motion to extend free school meals for eligible children until Easter 2021. He was criticised for this on social media. Levy also alleged that this included threats. In February 2023, a man was given a restraining order for harassing Levy between May and August 2022.

Levy was appointed as a Parliamentary Private Secretary (PPS) in the Cabinet Office in April 2022. He supported Boris Johnson's bid to return as PM in the October 2022 Conservative Party leadership election. Later in the year, Levy became a PPS in the Ministry of Defence.

Blyth Valley was abolished as part of the 2023 Periodic Review of Westminster constituencies. Levy was selected as the Conservative candidate for the new seat of Cramlington and Killingworth in April 2023. He finished third, behind the Labour and Reform UK candidates in the 2024 general election.

== Post-parliamentary career ==
After losing his seat in the 2024 general election, Levy founded and acts as the director of the workplace training company Team Training Group based in Blyth.

== Personal life ==
Levy is married and has two children. In January 2024, his wife Maureen was selected as the Conservative candidate for the new seat of Blyth and Ashington in the 2024 general election. She finished third in the election behind the Labour and Reform UK candidates.

Parliament of the United Kingdom
Preceded by Ronnie Campbell	Member of Parliament for Blyth Valley; 2019–2024	Constituency abolished
