= Eddie Milne =

British politician (1915–1983)

Member of Parliament for Blyth Valley
- In office 24 November 1960 – 20 September 1974
- Preceded by: Alfred Robens
- Succeeded by: John Ryman

Personal details
- Born: 18 October 1915
- Died: 23 March 1983 (aged 67)
- Party: Labour (until 1974); Independent (from 1974)

Edward James Milne (18 October 1915 – 23 March 1983) was a British Labour politician, who was elected as independent candidate after deselection by his party.

He succeeded Alfred Robens as MP for Blyth, later known as Blyth Valley, in a 1960 by-election. Robens was unexpectedly and somewhat controversially elevated to the chairmanship of the National Coal Board, and Milne, a trade union official, was selected by the local Constituency Labour Party with the support of the shopworkers union, USDAW.

During his Parliamentary career, Milne became increasingly concerned about problems of endemic corruption within local government in the north east of England. These were eventually revealed in the Poulson Affair involving corruption leading Labour movement figures Andrew Cunningham and T. Dan Smith. Known as a difficult man to get on with, Milne's problems were not restricted to his opponents in the local Labour Party; he twice unsuccessfully reported a local journalist, Jim Harland, to the Press Council over articles he had written.

By 1974 the breach between Milne and the local party was irreparable, and he was deselected on the eve of the February 1974 general election. Milne had already made preparations for this eventuality and ran a campaign as an Independent Labour candidate. He overturned the Labour majority and defeated Ivor Richard, who had the official endorsement, by 6,140 votes. This victory was short-lived, however, as Milne narrowly lost the seat to John Ryman in the October 1974 general election by 78 votes. Milne's supporters who won seats on the local authority had all been defeated by 1979; when Milne stood again in the 1979 general election he lost by over 7,000 votes.

Aspect of Milne's life are heavily mirrored by the character Eddie Wells, in Peter Flannery's 1996 television serial Our Friends In The North, particularly his fight against corruption in local government, and his election as an Independent Labour MP in 1974.

Milne wrote a book entitled No Shining Armour (1976) (ISBN 0-7145-3514-1) detailing his travails with the local party, and giving his view on the corruption scandals of the 1970s. It attracted 36 libel writs, and the costs and damages associated with it came close to bankrupting Calder Publications, his publishers.

Parliament of the United Kingdom
Preceded by Alfred Robens	Member of Parliament for Blyth; 1960–October 1974	Succeeded by John Ryman
