= Eric McGraw =

British publisher and prison reform activist (1945–2021)

Eric McGraw (born Derek Campbell, 3 February 1945 – 18 April 2021) was a British publisher and prison reform activist. Born in Blyth, Northumberland. He founded the prisoner's newspaper Inside Time in 1990.

McGraw died on 18 April 2021.
