= Northumberland County Council elections =

Local government elections in Northumberland, England

Northumberland County Council elections are held every four years. Northumberland County Council is the local authority for the unitary authority of Northumberland in England. Since the last boundary changes in 2013, 67 councillors have been elected from 66 wards.

== Council composition ==
Year	Conservative	Labour	Liberal Democrats (Note: Includes totals for the predecessors of the Liberal Democrats, the Liberal Party and SDP (both of which participated in the Alliance))	Reform	Green	Independent	Council control after election
Local government reorganisation; council established (62 seats)
1973	10	28	3 (Note: 3 Liberals)	–	–	21	No overall control
1977	20	21	0	–	0	21 (Note: Includes 4 Independent Labour and 2 Independent Conservatives.)	No overall control
New boundaries (66 seats)
1981	14	34	15	–	0	3	Labour
1985	12	30	20	–	0	4 (Note: Includes 1 Independent Conservative)	No overall control
1989	17	38	8	–	0	3	Labour
1993	13	39	11	–	0	5	Labour
1997	13	43	8	–	0	2	Labour
New boundaries (67 seats)
2001	17	38	9	–	0	3	Labour
2005	14	35	14	–	0	4	Labour
Unitary authority formed (67 seats)
2008	17	17	26	–	0	7	No overall control
2013	21	32	11	–	0	3	No overall control
2017	33	24	3	–	0	7	No overall control
2021	34	21	3	0	2	7	Conservative
New boundaries (69 seats)
2025	26	8	3	23	2	7	No overall control

== County result maps ==
1981 results map

1985 results map

1989 results map

1993 results map

1997 results map

2001 results map

2005 results map

2008 results map

2013 results map

2017 results map

2021 results map

2025 results map

== By-election results ==
=== 1997-2001 ===
Corbridge By-Election 17 September 1998
Party	Candidate	Votes	%	±%
Conservative		546	35.8	+0.5
Liberal Democrats		420	27.5	−9.6
Labour		307	20.1	−7.5
Independent		253	16.8	+16.8
Majority		126	8.3	
Turnout		1,526		
Conservative gain from Liberal Democrats		Swing		

Wansbeck Newbiggin East By-Election 25 February 1999
Party	Candidate	Votes	%	±%
Liberal Democrats		720	58.7	+58.7
Labour		483	39.4	−39.8
Conservative		23	1.9	−18.9
Majority		237	19.3	
Turnout		1,226		
Liberal Democrats gain from Labour		Swing		

Wansbeck Hirst By-Election 11 November 1999
Party	Candidate	Votes	%	±%
Labour		574	58.0	−21.3
Liberal Democrats		391	39.5	+18.8
Conservative		24	2.4	+2.4
Majority		183	18.5	
Turnout		989	30.0	
Labour hold		Swing		

=== 2005-2008 ===
Morpeth North By-Election 10 November 2005
Party	Candidate	Votes	%	±%
Liberal Democrats	Leslie Cassie	473	40.7	+0.3
Conservative	David Bawn	304	26.2	+3.8
Green	Nicholas Best	154	13.3	−3.0
Labour	Ian Fleming	144	12.4	−8.5
Independent	John Beynon	87	7.5	+7.5
Majority		169	14.5	−3.5
Turnout		1,162	33.9	−34.0
Liberal Democrats hold		Swing		

Choppington By-Election 3r May 2007
Party	Candidate	Votes	%	±%
Labour		841	67.2	+3.0
Liberal Democrats		411	32.8	+6.3
Majority		430	34.4	
Turnout		1,252		
Labour hold		Swing		

=== 2008-2013 ===
Ponteland East By-Election 4 November 2010
Party	Candidate	Votes	%	±%
Conservative	Eileen Armstrong	843	62.6	+2.0
Liberal Democrats	Andrew Duffield	403	29.9	+1.6
Labour	Andrew Avery	100	7.4	+2.9
Majority		440	32.7	
Turnout		1,346		
Conservative hold		Swing		

=== 2013-2017 ===
Longhoughton By-Election 24 July 2014
Party	Candidate	Votes	%	±%
Liberal Democrats	Kate Cairns	742	49.6	+49.6
Conservative	John Hope	352	23.5	+0.7
Independent	Wendy Pattison	208	13.9	+13.9
UKIP	Michael Weatheritt	146	9.8	−3.1
Labour	Nicola Morrison	48	3.2	+3.2
Majority		390	26.1	
Turnout		1,496		
Liberal Democrats gain from Independent		Swing		

College By-Election 30 July 2015
Party	Candidate	Votes	%	±%
Labour	Mark Purvis	508	69.5	−21.2
UKIP	Peter Curtis	102	14.0	+14.0
Liberal Democrats	Andy McGregor	82	11.2	+11.2
Conservative	Chris Galley	39	5.3	−4.0
Majority		406	55.5	
Turnout		731		
Labour hold		Swing		

Hexham West By-Election 4 February 2016
Party	Candidate	Votes	%	±%
Independent	Derek Kennedy	501	36.6	+36.6
Conservative	Tom Gillanders	454	33.2	−15.1
Labour	Nuala Rose	200	14.6	−0.3
Independent	Anne Pickering	125	9.1	+9.1
Green	Lee Williscroft-Ferris	89	6.5	+6.5
Majority		47	3.4	
Turnout		1,369		
Independent gain from Conservative		Swing		

=== 2017-2021 ===
Holywell By-Election 2 May 2019
Party	Candidate	Votes	%	±%
Labour	Leslie Bowman	916	57.6	+7.4
Conservative	Maureen Levy	510	32.1	−7.2
Liberal Democrats	Anita Romer	164	10.3	+10.3
Majority		406	25.5	
Turnout		1,590		
Labour hold		Swing		

=== 2021-2025 ===
Hexham East By-Election 16 December 2021
Party	Candidate	Votes	%	±%
Liberal Democrats	Suzanne Fairless-Aitken	584	47.3	+11.8
Conservative	Stephen Ball	370	30.0	−13.8
Labour	Jonathan Wheeler	154	12.5	−8.1
Independent	Lee Williscroft-Ferris	127	10.3	+10.3
Majority		214	17.3	
Turnout		1,235		
Liberal Democrats gain from Conservative		Swing		

Seghill with Seaton Delaval By-Election 24 March 2022
Party	Candidate	Votes	%	±%
Conservative	Eve Chicken	702	55.6	+1.1
Labour	Christine Savage	511	40.5	−5.0
Green	Clive Robson	29	2.3	+2.3
Liberal Democrats	Alisdair Gibbs-Barton	21	1.7	+1.7
Majority		191	15.1	
Turnout		1,263		
Conservative hold		Swing		

Cramlington Eastfield By-Election 22 August 2024
Party	Candidate	Votes	%	±%
Conservative	Alan Smith	513	43.5	−15.6
Labour	James Gillooly	371	31.5	+1.4
Reform	Mark Owen	177	15.0	+15.0
Independent	Libby Cripps	67	5.7	+5.7
Liberal Democrats	Andy McGregor	23	2.0	+2.0
Green	Paul Evans	22	1.9	+1.9
Independent	Dawn Furness	6	0.5	+0.5
Majority		142	12.0	
Turnout		1,179		
Conservative hold		Swing		

=== 2025-2029 ===
Cramlington South West By-Election 16 April 2026
Party	Candidate	Votes	%	±%
Conservative	Neil Graham	278	34.2	+9.0
Reform	Bridget Byrne	212	26.1	−13.3
Labour	Lynne Robinson	187	23.0	−5.8
Green	Alex Phimister	116	14.3	+14.3
Independent	Dawn Furness	13	1.6	+1.6
Liberal Democrats	Nick Cott	7	0.9	+0.9
Majority		66	8.1	
Turnout		813		
Conservative gain from Reform		Swing		

Amble By-Election 1 October 2026
Party	Candidate	Votes	%	±%
Labour	Amy Spriggs	439	38.8	+0.4
Reform	Warren Ladyman	379	33.5	−10.9
Conservative	Jenny Richards	237	21.0	+3.8
Restore	Michael Joyce	76	6.7	+6.7
Majority		60	5.3	
Turnout		1,131		
Labour gain from Reform		Swing		

Hirst By-Election 1 October 2026
Party	Candidate	Votes	%	±%
Labour	Melanie Tuesday Fox	350	50.1	+7.0
Reform	Kerry Davison	210	30.0	−20.0
Restore	Eden Webley	72	10.3	+10.3
Conservative	David Ferguson	29	4.1	−2.8
Liberal Democrats	Calvin Clark	27	3.9	+3.9
Independent	John Victor Allen	11	1.6	+1.6
Majority		140	20.0	
Turnout		700		
Labour gain from Reform		Swing		
