= Anne-Marie Trevelyan =

British politician (born 1969)

The Right Honourable Anne-Marie Trevelyan
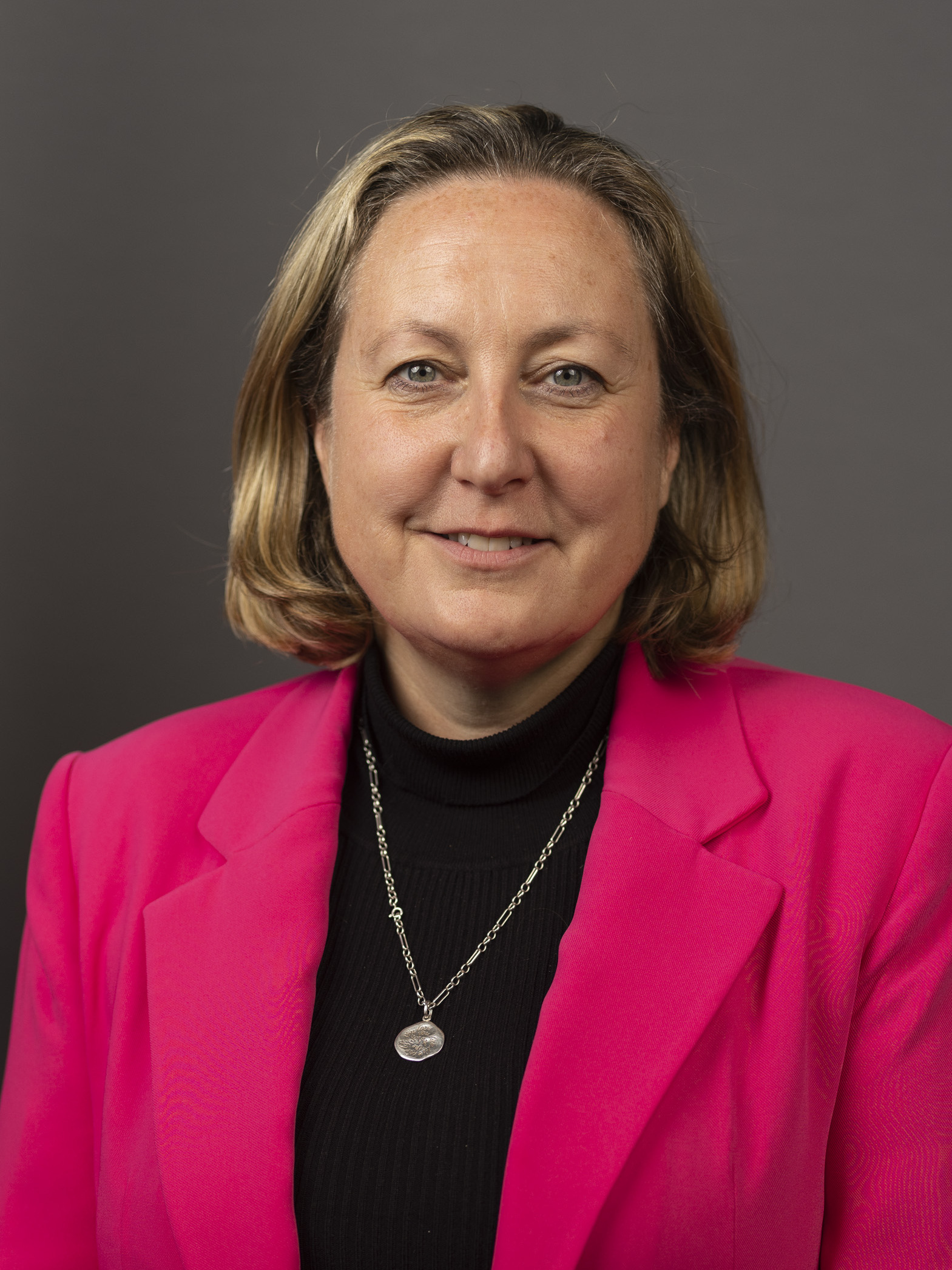
- Official portrait, 2022

Minister of State for Indo-Pacific
- In office 26 October 2022 – 5 July 2024
- Prime Minister: Rishi Sunak
- Preceded by: Office established
- Succeeded by: Catherine West

Secretary of State for Transport
- In office 6 September 2022 – 25 October 2022
- Prime Minister: Liz Truss
- Preceded by: Grant Shapps
- Succeeded by: Mark Harper

Secretary of State for International Trade President of the Board of Trade
- In office 15 September 2021 – 6 September 2022
- Prime Minister: Boris Johnson
- Preceded by: Liz Truss
- Succeeded by: Kemi Badenoch

Minister of State for Business, Energy and Clean Growth
- In office 8 January 2021 – 15 September 2021
- Prime Minister: Boris Johnson
- Preceded by: Kwasi Kwarteng
- Succeeded by: Greg Hands

Secretary of State for International Development
- In office 13 February 2020 – 2 September 2020
- Prime Minister: Boris Johnson
- Preceded by: Alok Sharma
- Succeeded by: Office abolished (Note: Development brief added to the Foreign and Commonwealth Secretary to create the Secretary of State for Foreign, Commonwealth and Development Affairs. Vicky Ford was later appointed Minister of State for Development in the FCDO on 6 September 2022)

Minister of State for the Armed Forces
- In office 16 December 2019 – 13 February 2020
- Prime Minister: Boris Johnson
- Preceded by: Mark Lancaster
- Succeeded by: James Heappey

Parliamentary Under-Secretary of State for Defence Procurement
- In office 27 July 2019 – 16 December 2019
- Prime Minister: Boris Johnson
- Preceded by: Stuart Andrew
- Succeeded by: James Heappey

Member of Parliament for Berwick-upon-Tweed
- In office 7 May 2015 – 30 May 2024
- Preceded by: Alan Beith
- Succeeded by: Constituency abolished, David Smith (North Northumberland)

Personal details
- Born: Anne-Marie Belinda Beaton; 6 April 1969 (age 57) London, England
- Party: Conservative
- Spouse: John Trevelyan (divorced)
- Children: 2
- Education: Oxford Polytechnic
- Website: teamtrevelyan.co.uk

Anne-Marie Belinda Trevelyan (née Beaton; born 6 April 1969) is a British politician who served as Minister of State for Indo-Pacific under Rishi Sunak between October 2022 to July 2024. A member of the Conservative Party, she was the Member of Parliament (MP) for Berwick-upon-Tweed from 2015 until 2024, when she lost her seat in the 2024 general election to Labour. She previously served in the Cabinets of Boris Johnson and Liz Truss.

Trevelyan served in the cabinet as Secretary of State for International Development from February to September 2020, Secretary of State for International Trade and President of the Board of Trade from 2021 to 2022, and Secretary of State for Transport from September to October 2022. As well as serving in Secretary of State positions, Trevelyan has also served in the junior minister positions of Minister of State for Business, Energy and Clean Growth in 2021, Minister of State for the Armed Forces between 2019 and 2020, and Parliamentary Under-Secretary of State for Defence Procurement in 2019. At the 2025 Northumberland County Council election she contested the Druridge Bay ward against the leader of Northumberland Labour, placing third.

== Early life and career ==
Trevelyan was born in London on 6 April 1969, the daughter of Donald Leonard and Katherine (née Bougarel) Beaton. Trevelyan was privately educated at St Paul's Girls' School, Hammersmith. She subsequently studied at Oxford Polytechnic.

She qualified as a chartered accountant in London with Price Waterhouse (a predecessor firm of PricewaterhouseCoopers) and worked in PwC's corporate finance department before moving to Northumberland in 1996. She is a former Governor of Northumbria Healthcare Trust and of Berwick Academy. Reports prepared by Trevelyan's "Dual the A1 Campaign" were submitted to the consultation to make the road a dual carriageway.

She unsuccessfully stood as the Conservative candidate in the Morpeth North ward of Castle Morpeth Borough Council in 1999. She subsequently stood as the Conservative candidate in the Hartburn ward of Castle Morpeth Borough Council in 2003, but failed to get elected.

Trevelyan unsuccessfully stood in the 2010 general election as the Conservative candidate for Berwick-upon-Tweed, achieving a swing from the Liberal Democrats to Conservatives of 8.3%. In so doing, she reduced Sir Alan Beith's majority from 8,632 to 2,690.

== Political career ==
=== Parliamentary career ===
==== Backbencher ====
At the 2015 general election, Trevelyan was elected as the MP for Berwick-upon-Tweed, gaining the seat for the Conservatives with a 9.6% swing, after the sitting MP Sir Alan Beith stood down. She was re-elected with an increased majority in the 2017 general election. She increased her majority again in the 2019 election. In the 2024 general election, Trevelyan contended the new seat of North Northumberland and lost to Labour.

In June 2015, Trevelyan was appointed Vice-Chairman of the newly created All-Party Parliamentary Group on Forestry. In Parliament, Trevelyan served on the Public Accounts Select Committee between July 2015 and May 2017.

In November 2015, she was appointed to the Parliamentary Assembly of the Organization for Security and Co-operation in Europe. On 27 October 2016 during Prime Minister's Questions the then-Prime Minister Theresa May praised Trevelyan for her work on the Armed Forces Covenant. In January 2018, Trevelyan was appointed as Parliamentary Private Secretary to Gavin Williamson in the Ministry of Defence.

An outspoken Eurosceptic, Trevelyan resigned as a Parliamentary Private Secretary in November 2018 over her disagreement with Theresa May's draft Brexit withdrawal agreement.

In November 2018, Trevelyan referred Labour shadow minister Kate Osamor to the Parliamentary Commissioner for Standards, on the grounds that Osamor's behaviour "failed to uphold" the code of conduct for MPs, after Osamor continued to employ her son Haringey Councillor, Ishmael Osamor, as a senior communications adviser, despite her son pleading guilty to possession of drugs valued at £2,500. Osamor denied any wrongdoing and called the referral "politically motivated".

==== Ministerial positions ====
===== Minister of State for Defence Procurement =====
On 27 July 2019, Trevelyan was appointed Parliamentary Under-Secretary of State for Defence Procurement in the first Johnson ministry.

===== Minister of State for the Armed Forces =====
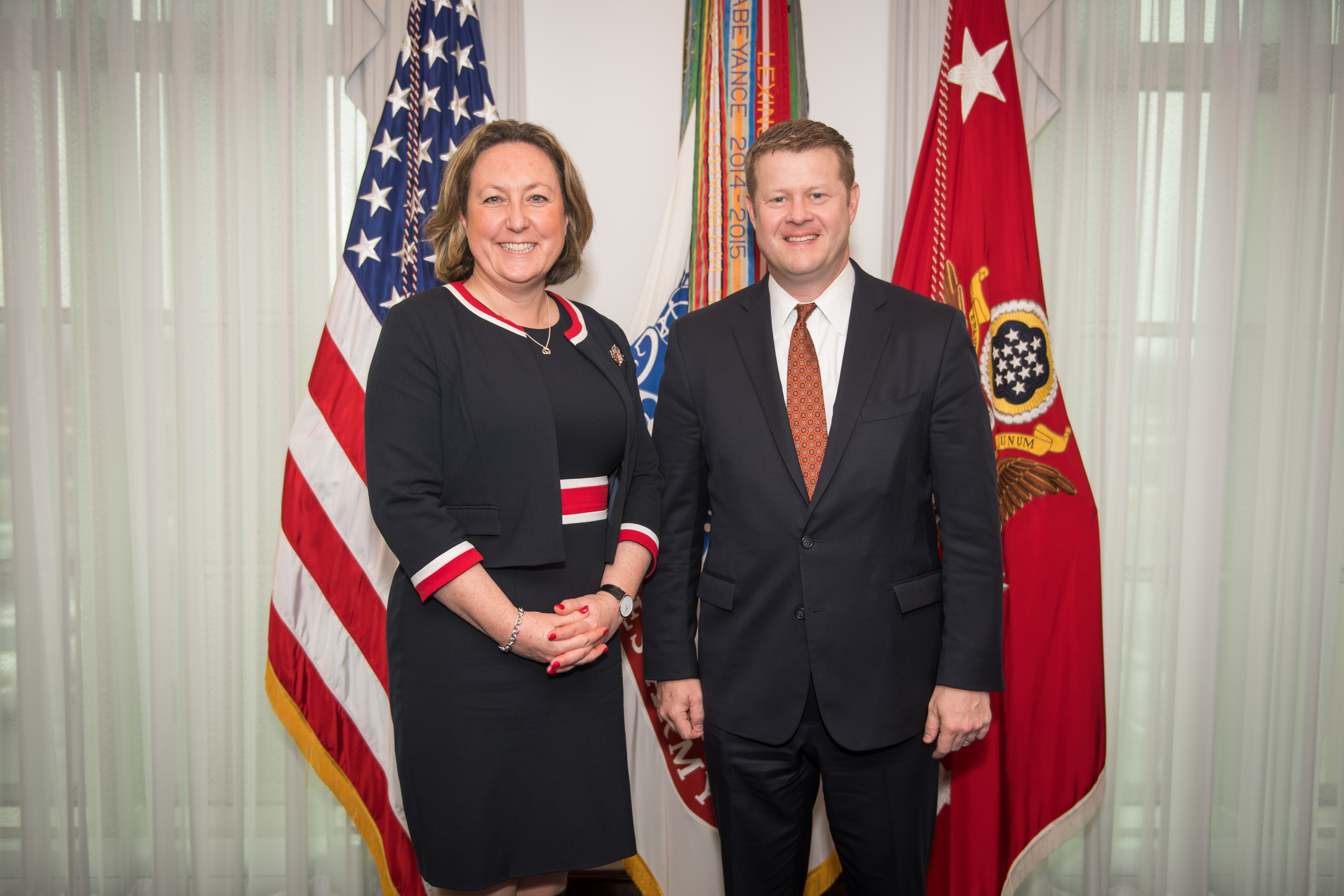
United States Secretary of the Army, Ryan D. McCarthy (2019-2021), meeting Trevelyan at The Pentagon in Arlington, Virginia in February 2020 when she was Minister of State for the Armed Forces

She was promoted to Minister of State for the Armed Forces on 16 December 2019. As Minister of State for the Armed Forces, she met with the United States Secretary of the Army Ryan D. McCarthy at The Pentagon on 11 February 2020.

===== Secretary of State for International Development =====
On 13 February 2020, Trevelyan was promoted to Secretary of State for International Development during the first cabinet reshuffle of the second Johnson ministry. Prior to her appointment, Trevelyan expressed apparent scepticism about the value of foreign aid on a number of occasions.

In May 2020 the Labour MP and first British female MP of Chinese descent Sarah Owen accused Trevelyan of Sinophobia after Trevelyan posted a WhatsApp message of a picture of a split fortune cookie, saying in broken English "You not have coronavirus", captioned "Just received my Covid-19 rapid test kit from China. Soooooo relieved!", with a follow-up message of "Just for Bob" and a winking emoji referring to Conservative MP Bob Seely, who responded by sending a love heart and smiling emoji. Owen said: "If Anne-Marie Trevelyan doesn't understand why this sort of humour was left in the 1970s, I would be happy to explain it to her." Seely responded to Owen by saying "It was a well-meaning joke at my expense and I didn't think anything of it", referring to his campaign against the Chinese tech company Huawei. Trevelyan responded to Owen by saying "It was not my intent to cause any offence, and I am truly sorry if I did so".

After the Beirut explosion of 4 August 2020, the UK government, through Trevelyan's Secretary of International Development Department, aid-funded the UK Emergency Medical Team (UK EMT) were sent to help. The UK also gave £5m in emergency support, £3m of it for the British Red Cross. As International Development Secretary, Trevelyan represented the UK at a donor event hosted by UN secretary general António Guterres and French president Emmanuel Macron.

Due to the COVID-19 pandemic, in August 2020 Trevelyan set up the Vulnerable Supply Chains Facility, its funding being £4.85 million from UK aid and £2 million from businesses. The premise was that the Department for International Development, UK supermarket and fashion businesses such as Morrisons, Tesco, Marks & Spencer and Primark, and charities such as Care UK, The Fairtrade Foundation and the Ethical Trading Initiative, work together to improve working conditions and support access to healthcare and health information for workers in developing countries, with a focus on countries such as Myanmar, Bangladesh, Kenya, Uganda, Ethiopia, Tanzania, Rwanda and Ghana.

Trevelyan's department was merged with the Foreign and Commonwealth Office on 2 September 2020, when Foreign Secretary Dominic Raab assumed responsibility for a new department, named the Foreign, Commonwealth and Development Office. This made her the last Secretary of State for International Development. Following the merger, Trevelyan left the government.

===== Minister of State for Business, Energy and Clean Growth =====
Trevelyan returned to the backbench between September 2020 and January 2021 during which time on 7 November 2020, Trevelyan was appointed the UK International Champion on Adaptation and Resilience for the COP26 Presidency. However on 8 January 2021, Trevelyan returned to government after being appointed Minister of State for Business, Energy and Clean Growth at the Department for Business, Energy and Industrial Strategy.

===== Secretary of State for International Trade =====
On 15 September 2021, Trevelyan was appointed Secretary of State for International Trade during the second cabinet reshuffle of the second Johnson ministry.

In November 2021 The Independent Parliamentary Standards Authority (IPSA) revealed Trevelyan's accommodation expenses were £136,590.26 on a flat in London since she was elected in 2015, despite the fact she had already had a flat in London which she does not use. The criticism of her accommodation expenses were part of the parliamentary second jobs controversy following Owen Patterson's resignation from Parliament.

During the second jobs controversy Trevelyan supported MPs having second jobs outside parliament, however on different radio shows commented different hours a week an MP should be allowed to work outside parliament. On Times Radio she said they should be allowed to work 8 to 10 hours a week, on BBC Breakfast 10 or 15 hours a week, and on BBC Radio 4 10 to 20 hours a week. Her comment to BBC Breakfast was ridiculed on the current affairs panel show Have I Got New For You, "I think the question of MPs having jobs that involve lobbying perhaps should be looked at again. But, across the board, I don't think we should have a removal of the ability to maintain a second job, because it brings a richness to our role as members of parliament."

Trevelyan supported Prime Minister Boris Johnson during the Westminster lockdown parties controversy. After Boris Johnson's resignation, on 7 July 2022, launched the July 2022 Conservative Party leadership election, she supported Tom Tugendhat, and was his proposer for his candidacy. After he was knocked out in the 3rd ballot on 19 July she endorsed Foreign Secretary Liz Truss., who won the election on 5 September, againist former Chancellor Rishi Sunak, getting 57.4% of the member's vote to Sunak's 42.6%.

===== Secretary of State for Transport =====
On 6 September 2022, Trevelyan was appointed Secretary of State for Transport during the formation of the Truss ministry.

On 21 September 2022, she also assumed responsibility for shipping and aviation, previously handled by the Under-Secretary of State for Transport Robert Courts. She was the first modern Secretary of State for Transport to assume responsibility for shipping directly, as this responsibility has traditionally been delegated to a junior minister.

After Liz Truss's resignation on 20 October 2022 Trevelyan endorsed former Prime Minister Boris Johnson in the resulting Conservative Party leadership election, after Johnson stated he would not run for a second term Trevelyan did not endorse anyone else for the leadership. Rishi Sunak went on to win the election unopposed on 24 October 2022 after Penny Mordaunt withdrew from the election.

===== Minister of State for Indo-Pacific =====
On 25 October 2022 Trevelyan was dismissed as Secretary of State for Transport by Rishi Sunak upon his ascension to Prime Minister, being replaced by Mark Harper. On 26 October 2022, Trevelyan was appointed as Minister of State for Indo-Pacific. The appointment was a demotion, as it did not include a seat in the cabinet, and it was reported as such by various media outlets due to her support for Liz Truss in the July–September leadership election, against Rishi Sunak.

In the 2024 UK General Election, Trevelyan stood for the seat of North Northumberland, the successor seat to her seat of Berwick-upon-Tweed in the 2023 review of Westminster constituencies. She lost the seat to Labour's David Smith by 5,067 votes.

== Post-parliamentary career ==
Following her defeat at the 2024 UK General Election, Trevelyan launched Trevelyan Consulting, working as a strategic advisor on defence and security issues. In December 2024, Strategy and communications agency Fullbrook Strategies hired Treveylan as a senior advisor to lead its strategic global projects team.

In April 2025, Trevelyan announced her intention to stand as the Conservative Party candidate for Druridge Bay ward in the Northumberland County Council election. She ultimately secured 163 votes, finishing third behind the successful Labour Party candidate and Reform UK.

== Political stances ==
=== Euroscepticism ===
In June 2015, Trevelyan joined the Conservatives for Britain group, a Eurosceptic group within the Conservative Party which subsequently moved closer to outright opposition to British membership of the European Union. She later joined the European Research Group – the primary Eurosceptic lobbying group within Parliament. Trevelyan advocated a vote in favour of Brexit for the 2016 EU membership referendum.

In March 2018, she attended a protest in London organised by the Fishing for Leave group against proposed access to British waters for EU fisherman up to 2021. The event included the UKIP MEP Nigel Farage. The Independent reported that Trevelyan faced calls from fellow ministerial aides for her sacking as a ministerial aide after attending the event in defiance of an order from Conservative whips for party MPs not to take part. On 15 November 2018, Trevelyan resigned from her post as a Parliamentary Private Secretary over Theresa May's draft EU withdrawal agreement.

=== Environmental issues ===
Trevelyan has campaigned for reducing plastic packaging. In 2005, she opposed the ban on fox hunting. She supports fracking, including voting in 2016 in support of fracking under Northumberland National Park, and voting against Labour's motion to ban fracking for shale gas in October 2022. Between 2010 and 2012 Trevelyan wrote a series of tweets denying global warming, including stating "[there is] clear evidence that the ice caps aren't melting after all" and "global warming isn't actually happening".

=== Armed Forces ===
Trevelyan is a member of the Armed Forces Parliamentary Scheme and campaigns to improve mental health services for veterans in Northumberland.

=== Local issues ===
In 2015 Trevelyan secured the support of life sciences minister George Freeman for Covance (now Fortrea) which had a site in her constituency.

Trevelyan campaigned for dualling the A1 road. In 2007 she set the Dual the A1 campaign group to raise government awareness. In 2014 then-Prime Minister David Cameron announced an initial £290 million investment to upgrade the road.

Trevelyan has campaigned for improving rural broadband. She has also campaigned for reopening the Harbottle Surgery.

In September 2020 she commented on the rejection of the opening of an open cast mine at Druridge Bay, a seven-mile stretch of Northumberland Coast from the seaport town of Amble to the village of Cresswell:

This decision from the Secretary of State is incredibly welcome to all of us who have campaigned to protect our precious coastline, and the community in Druridge Bay who have had the spectre of this proposition hanging over them for a number of years. The Prime Minister was clear when he brought forward our goal to stop producing coal to 2024, that this Government will honour its commitments to a cleaner, greener future, and our target of net zero by 2050. This long-fought battle to protect our local environment has been a culmination of years of work by local people, groups and politicians of all parties, coming together to work for the future of their community and I pay tribute to everyone who has played their part in safeguarding our incredible landscape for future generations.

== Political campaign finances ==
=== Alleged overspending ===
In May 2016, it was reported that Trevelyan was one of a number of Conservative MPs being investigated by police in the 2015 general election party spending investigation, for allegedly spending more than the legal limit on constituency election campaign expenses. In May 2017, the Crown Prosecution Service said that while there was evidence of inaccurate spending returns, it did not "meet the test" for further action.

=== Donations from Alexander Temerko ===
In April 2018, Trevelyan was criticised by the Alnwick Labour Party over claims that a Ukrainian businessman gave almost £50,000 to fund her 2015 general election campaign. The Labour Party questioned why the Conservative Party was accepting large donations from such sources. Trevelyan stated that the man in question, Alexander Temerko, was now a naturalised British citizen born in Ukraine who had invested significantly in the region, that she had personally not received any funds from him, and that all funds went to the Berwick-upon-Tweed Conservative Association, "as is his right as a British citizen".

Temerko was born in the Ukrainian Soviet Socialist Republic (present-day Ukraine, then a part of the Soviet Union). He fled to London shortly after he was examined by criminal investigators in October 2004.

Trevelyan's connections with Temerko caused her to step down from a Government project that involved him. In 2021, Temerko was responsible for a project to establish a cross-channel power cable to provide an electricity link between England's south coast and Normandy in France, and so Trevelyan recused herself from the project, Labour MP Catherine West said that Trevelyan "quite rightly recused herself". Fellow Conservative MP Alok Sharma also recused himself, leaving then Business Secretary Kwasi Kwarteng responsible for the decision making.

== Personal life ==
Trevelyan lives in Northumberland. She is divorced with two children. In October 2017, she said that one of her teenage sons might not have voted for her if he had been old enough to vote. She previously lived in Netherwitton Hall, a Grade II listed country house near Morpeth with her former husband John Trevelyan, owner of the Netherwitton Hall Estates.

She took part in the Singing for Syrians concert at Westminster in December 2017.

Parliament of the United Kingdom
Preceded by Alan Beith	Member of Parliament for Berwick-upon-Tweed; 2015–2024	Constituency abolished
Political offices
Preceded by Stuart Andrew	Minister for Defence Procurement; 2019	Succeeded by James Heappey
Preceded by Mark Lancaster	Minister of State for the Armed Forces; 2019–2020	Succeeded by James Heappey as Parliamentary Under-Secretary of State for the Armed Forces
Preceded by Alok Sharma	Secretary of State for International Development; 2020	Succeeded by Dominic Raab as Secretary of State for Foreign, Commonwealth and Development Affairs
Preceded by Kwasi Kwarteng	Minister of State for Business, Energy and Clean Growth; 2021	Succeeded by Greg Hands
Preceded by Liz Truss	Secretary of State for International Trade; 2021–2022	Succeeded by Kemi Badenoch
Preceded by Liz Truss	President of the Board of Trade; 2021–2022	Succeeded by Kemi Badenoch
Preceded by Grant Shapps	Secretary of State for Transport; 2022	Succeeded by Mark Harper
