= 2025 Northumberland County Council election =

2025 UK local government election

- 1 May 2025

All 69 seats to Northumberland County Council 36 seats needed for a majority

	First party	Second party	Third party
Leader	Glen Sanderson	none	Scott Dickinson
Party	Conservative	Reform	Labour
Leader's seat	Longhorsley	none	Druridge Bay
Last election	34 seats, 46.6%	0 seats, 0.4%	21 seats, 30.4%
Seats before	33	0	18
Seats won	26	23	8
Seat change	▼8	▲23	▼13
Popular vote	29,122	29,540	22,517
Percentage	28.8%	29.3%	22.3%
Swing	▼17.8%	▲28.9%	▼8.1%
	Fourth party	Fifth party	Sixth party
Leader	Derek Kennedy (Note: Leader of the Independent Group)	Jeff Reid (retiring)	Nick Morphet (retiring)
Party	Independent	Liberal Democrats	Green
Leader's seat	Hexham West	Plessey	Humshaugh
Last election	7 seats, 8.9%	3 seats, 8.4%	2 seats, 5.2%
Seats before	10 (Note: Of the independent councillors prior to the election, eight formed the Independent Group, and the other two were not aligned to any group.)	4	2
Seats won	7	3	2
Seat change	Steady	Steady	Steady
Popular vote	8,225	6,643	4,724
Percentage	8.1%	6.6%	4.7%
Swing	▼0.8%	▼1.8%	▼0.5%
- Winner of each seat at the 2025 Northumberland County Council election
Leader before election
Glen Sanderson
Conservative
No overall control
Leader after election
Glen Sanderson
Conservative
No overall control

The 2025 Northumberland County Council election took place on 1 May 2025 to elect members to Northumberland County Council in Northumberland, England. 69 members were elected on the same day as other local elections across England. In the election the council remained under no overall control. Alongside Buckinghamshire, this was one of the only two councils where the Conservatives were elected as the largest party.

== Background ==
At the 2021 election, the Conservatives won control of the council. They subsequently lost their majority later in 2021 following a by-election, but continued to run the council as a minority administration between 2021 and 2025. New division boundaries were drawn up to come into effect for the 2025 election, increasing the number of councillors from 67 to 69.

== Previous council composition ==
After 2021 election		Before 2025 election	
Party	Seats	Party	Seats
Conservative	34	Conservative	33
Labour	21	Labour	18
Liberal Democrats	3	Liberal Democrats	4
Green	2	Green	2
Independent	7	Independent	10

=== Changes ===
- November 2021: Cath Homer (Conservative) resigns – by-election held December 2021
- December 2021: Suzanne Fairless-Aitken (Liberal Democrats) gains by-election from Conservatives
- January 2022: Paul Scott (Conservative) dies – by-election held March 2022
- February 2022: Holly Waddell (Labour) suspended from party
- March 2022: Eve Chicken (Conservative) wins by-election
- May 2023: Holly Waddell (sitting as an independent since her Labour expulsion) joins the Independent Group
- June 2023: Mary Murphy (Labour) leaves party to sit as an independent
- June 2024: Christine Dunbar (Conservative) resigns – by-election held August 2024
- August 2024: Alan Smith (Conservative) wins by-election
- October 2024: Liz Simpson (Labour) leaves party to sit as an independent

== Summary ==
Prior to the election the council was under no overall control, being run by a Conservative minority administration led by Glen Sanderson. The election saw the Conservatives lose seats, but they remained the largest party, having 26 seats after the election. Reform UK had no seats on the council prior to the election; it won 23 seats, overtaking Labour to become the second largest party on the council. Reform UK chose Mark Peart to be its group leader after the election. At the subsequent annual council meeting on 21 May 2025, both Sanderson and Peart were proposed to be the new leader of the council. Sanderson was chosen by 34 votes to 22, with the Independent Group, Liberal Democrats and Green Party all voting in favour of Sanderson, whilst Labour abstained. The council therefore continued to be run by a Conservative minority administration, with all positions on the council's cabinet being given to Conservatives.

=== Election result ===
2025 Northumberland County Council election
Party	Candidates	Seats	Gains	Losses	Net gain/loss	Seats %	Votes %	Votes	+/−
Conservative	69	26	0	7	▼8	37.7	28.8	29,122	–17.8
Reform	69	23	16	0	▲23	33.3	29.3	29,540	+28.9
Labour	69	8	2	11	▼13	11.6	22.3	22,517	–8.1
Independent	21	7	0	0	Steady	10.1	8.1	8,225	–0.8
Liberal Democrats	29	3	1	1	Steady	4.3	6.6	6,643	–1.8
Green	29	2	0	0	Steady	2.9	4.7	4,724	–0.5
Majority	1	0	0	0	Steady	0.0	0.1	127	N/A
SDP	1	0	0	0	Steady	0.0	<0.1	46	–0.2
Animal Welfare	1	0	0	0	Steady	0.0	<0.1	25	N/A
Heritage	1	0	0	0	Steady	0.0	<0.1	16	N/A

== Division results ==
=== Alnwick Castle ===
Alnwick Castle
Party	Candidate	Votes	%
Conservative	Gordon Castle*	709	46.8
Reform	Martin Harrington	418	27.6
Labour	John Shepherd	148	9.8
Green	Laura Hawken	129	8.5
Liberal Democrats	Sibylle Stenzel	111	7.3
Majority		291	19.2
Turnout		1,518	40.2
Registered electors		3,779	
Conservative win (new seat)			

=== Alnwick Hotspur ===
Alnwick Hotspur
Party	Candidate	Votes	%
Green	Martin Swinbank*	760	56.4
Reform	Ian Caldwell	273	20.3
Conservative	Geoff Watson	153	11.4
Liberal Democrats	Karen Hedley	110	8.2
Labour	Helen Seymour	51	3.8
Majority		487	36.1
Turnout		1,348	38.0
Registered electors		3,547	
Green win (new seat)			

=== Amble ===
Amble
Party	Candidate	Votes	%	±%
Reform	Arty Hume	514	44.4	N/A
Labour Co-op	Terry Clark*	445	38.4	–12.9
Conservative	Jenny Richards	199	17.2	–26.5
Majority		69	6.0	N/A
Turnout		1,161	31.8	+0.5
Registered electors		3,654		
Reform gain from Labour Co-op				

=== Amble West with Warkworth ===
Amble West with Warkworth
Party	Candidate	Votes	%	±%
Reform	Pauline Davidson	397	23.8	N/A
Green	Ivor Rackham	351	21.0	N/A
Conservative	Jeff Watson*	325	19.4	–32.1
Independent	Ann Burke	292	17.5	N/A
Labour	Amy Spriggs	196	11.7	–7.4
Liberal Democrats	Alexander Brewis	110	6.6	–22.8
Majority		46	2.1	N/A
Turnout		1,674	46.0	+3.5
Registered electors		3,643		
Reform gain from Conservative				

=== Ashington Central ===
Ashington Central
Party	Candidate	Votes	%	±%
Labour	Caroline Ball*	463	47.9	–7.9
Reform	Kerry Davison	457	47.3	N/A
Conservative	Kyle Morrison	46	4.8	–11.0
Majority		6	0.6	–28.4
Turnout		970	27.6	–2.5
Registered electors		3,521		
Labour hold				

=== Bamburgh ===
Bamburgh
Party	Candidate	Votes	%	±%
Conservative	Guy Renner-Thompson*	1,068	56.1	–15.1
Reform	Pip Robson	488	25.6	N/A
Liberal Democrats	Lydia Cairns	154	8.1	–5.0
Labour	Bill Grisdale	121	6.4	–9.3
Green	Benjamin Brooks	73	3.8	N/A
Majority		580	30.5	–20.0
Turnout		1,910	49.9	+7.1
Registered electors		3,829		
Conservative hold				

=== Bebside & Kitty Brewster ===
Bebside & Kitty Brewster
Party	Candidate	Votes	%
Reform	Denise Nicholson	528	47.0
Labour	Grant Davey	319	28.4
Conservative	Wojciech Ploszaj*	276	24.6
Majority		209	18.6
Turnout		1,126	31.1
Registered electors		3,623	
Reform win (new seat)			

=== Bedlington Central ===
Bedlington Central
Party	Candidate	Votes	%	±%
Independent	Christine Taylor*	600	40.9	–7.3
Reform	Brian Denny	485	33.1	N/A
Labour	Kylie Berry-Walker	207	14.1	–18.3
Conservative	Charlotte Blundred	99	6.7	–2.0
Green	Geoff Hill	76	5.2	N/A
Majority		115	7.8	–8.0
Turnout		1,469	37.2	+2.5
Registered electors		3,946		
Independent hold				

=== Bedlington East ===
Bedlington East
Party	Candidate	Votes	%	±%
Reform	Trevor Austin	528	45.8	N/A
Labour	Rebecca Wilczek*	291	25.2	–20.6
Independent	Victoria Thompson	275	23.9	–0.8
Conservative	Gavin Duffy	59	5.1	–6.4
Majority		237	20.6	N/A
Turnout		1,154	30.4	
Registered electors		3,802		
Reform gain from Labour				

=== Bedlington West ===
Bedlington West
Party	Candidate	Votes	%	±%
Independent	Malcolm Robinson*	755	47.7	–3.0
Reform	Lawrence Chapple	444	28.0	N/A
Labour	Adam Hogg	298	18.8	–9.8
Conservative	Alastair Marrion	86	5.4	–23.2
Majority		311	19.7	–2.3
Turnout		1,590	37.1	+3.4
Registered electors		4,286		
Independent hold				

=== Bellingham ===
Bellingham
Party	Candidate	Votes	%	±%
Conservative	John Riddle*	615	39.0	–20.6
Reform	Warren Ladyman	515	32.7	N/A
Liberal Democrats	Kevin Smith	268	17.0	–6.2
Labour	Paul Wright	178	11.3	–5.9
Majority		100	6.3	–29.7
Turnout		1,580	47.2	+1.3
Registered electors		3,346		
Conservative hold				

=== Berwick East ===
Berwick East
Party	Candidate	Votes	%	±%
Independent	Georgina Hall*	894	77.3	+2.1
Reform	Jay Johnston	191	16.5	N/A
Labour	Paul Claridge	52	4.5	N/A
Conservative	Kacper Malec	19	1.6	–11.8
Majority		703	60.8	–1.0
Turnout		1,163	34.2	–1.5
Registered electors		3,403		
Independent hold				

=== Berwick North ===
Berwick North
Party	Candidate	Votes	%	±%
Reform	Nicole Brooke	360	27.7	N/A
Conservative	Catherine Seymour*	356	27.4	–7.2
Labour	Simon Dixon	256	19.7	–6.4
Green	Thomas Stewart	164	12.6	N/A
Liberal Democrats	Matthew Cooper	163	12.5	+6.1
Majority		4	0.3	N/A
Turnout		1,303	37.8	–3.7
Registered electors		3,443		
Reform gain from Conservative				

=== Berwick West with Ord ===
Berwick West with Ord
Party	Candidate	Votes	%	±%
Liberal Democrats	Elizabeth Hunter*	521	47.1	+7.1
Reform	Roddy Hamilton	367	33.2	N/A
Conservative	Barry Flux	77	7.0	–32.9
Green	Nigel Foster	76	6.9	+0.4
Labour	James Haswell	64	5.8	N/A
Majority		154	13.9	+13.8
Turnout		1,111	33.7	+1.6
Registered electors		3,297		
Liberal Democrats hold				

=== Bothal ===
Bothal
Party	Candidate	Votes	%	±%
Reform	Scott Amery	533	43.6	N/A
Labour Co-op	Lynne Grimshaw*	449	36.7	–22.0
Liberal Democrats	Andy McGregor	160	13.1	–3.7
Conservative	Batty Bawn	60	4.9	–19.6
Independent	Ken Cochrane	21	1.7	N/A
Majority		84	6.9	N/A
Turnout		1,234	35.3	+0.9
Registered electors		3,500		
Reform gain from Labour Co-op				

=== Choppington & Hepscott ===
Choppington & Hepscott
Party	Candidate	Votes	%
Reform	David Fitzgerald	421	32.1
Conservative	Rachael Hogg	346	26.4
Independent	Mary Murphy*	276	21.0
Labour	Tom Young	269	20.5
Majority		75	5.7
Turnout		1,317	36.9
Registered electors		3,566	
Reform win (new seat)			

=== College with North Seaton ===
College with North Seaton
Party	Candidate	Votes	%
Reform	Steven Roberts	537	47.6
Labour	Mark Purvis*	479	42.4
Conservative	Nicola Bawn	113	10.0
Majority		58	15.2
Turnout		1,131	29.5
Registered electors		3,837	
Reform win (new seat)			

=== Corbridge ===
Corbridge
Party	Candidate	Votes	%	±%
Conservative	Nick Oliver*	1,070	53.2	–8.6
Labour	Roy Sheehan	515	25.6	+11.0
Reform	Kerry Knight	278	13.8	+11.2
Liberal Democrats	Rob Earnshaw	147	7.3	–0.1
Majority		555	27.6	–19.6
Turnout		2,011	49.7	+0.2
Registered electors		4,049		
Conservative hold		Swing	▼9.8	

=== Cowpen ===
Cowpen
Party	Candidate	Votes	%	±%
Reform	Rick Baker	534	44.7	N/A
Conservative	Brian Erskine	339	28.4	–16.3
Labour	Candice Randall	321	26.9	–20.1
Majority		195	16.3	N/A
Turnout		1,205	32.5	+6.1
Registered electors		3,709		
Reform gain from Labour				

=== Cramlington East & Double Row ===
Cramlington East & Double Row
Party	Candidate	Votes	%
Independent	Scott Lee*	347	30.7
Reform	Scott Freebairn	341	30.2
Labour	Feona Bowey	329	29.1
Conservative	Alex McMullen	113	10.0
Majority		6	0.5
Turnout		1,139	30.3
Registered electors		3,761	
Independent win (new seat)			

=== Cramlington Eastfield ===
Cramlington Eastfield
Party	Candidate	Votes	%	±%
Conservative	Alan Smith	565	42.4	–16.7
Reform	Allyn Roberts	313	23.5	N/A
Labour	James Gillooly	230	17.2	–12.9
Independent	Susan Johnston	142	10.6	–0.2
Green	Paul Evans	61	4.6	N/A
Independent	Dawn Furness	23	1.7	N/A
Majority		252	18.9	–10.2
Turnout		1,338	35.0	
Registered electors		3,821		
Conservative hold				

=== Cramlington North ===
Cramlington North
Party	Candidate	Votes	%	±%
Conservative	Wayne Daley*	1,234	69.1	–7.7
Reform	Kevin Allen	276	15.5	N/A
Labour	Megan Foley	275	15.4	–7.8
Majority		958	53.6	+2.8
Turnout		1,795	44.6	+2.2
Registered electors		4,025		
Conservative hold				

=== Cramlington North West ===
Cramlington North West
Party	Candidate	Votes	%
Conservative	Mark Morris	400	38.0
Reform	Bridget Byrne	336	31.9
Labour	Michael Pearce	316	30.0
Majority		64	6.1
Turnout		1,061	28.7
Registered electors		3,694	
Conservative win (new seat)			

=== Cramlington South East ===
Cramlington South East
Party	Candidate	Votes	%	±%
Conservative	Paul Ezhilchelvan*	859	53.8	–8.0
Labour Co-op	Allan Hepple	373	23.3	–14.9
Reform	Anthony Pattinson	301	18.8	N/A
Green	Kath Leyland	65	4.1	N/A
Majority		486	30.5	+6.9
Turnout		1,611	44.7	–0.5
Registered electors		3,604		
Conservative hold		Swing	▲3.5	

=== Cramlington South West ===
Cramlington South West
Party	Candidate	Votes	%
Reform	Shaun Knowles	274	39.4
Labour	Scott White	200	28.8
Conservative	Neil Graham	175	25.2
SDP	Mathew Wilkinson	46	6.6
Majority		74	10.6
Turnout		697	26.5
Registered electors		2,629	
Reform win (new seat)			

=== Cramlington Village ===
Cramlington Village
Party	Candidate	Votes	%	±%
Conservative	Mark Swinburn*	791	53.4	–15.0
Reform	Mark Byrne	324	21.9	N/A
Labour	Lynna Robinson	275	18.6	–7.5
Green	Steve Leyland	91	6.1	+0.5
Majority		467	31.5	–10.8
Turnout		1,489	39.4	
Registered electors		3,783		
Conservative hold				

=== Croft ===
Croft
Party	Candidate	Votes	%	±%
Reform	Mark Peart	652	59.22	+54.00
Labour	Kath Nisbet*	343	31.15	–28.13
Conservative	Michael Green	106	9.63	–21.61
Majority		309	28.0	N/A
Turnout		1,102	29.6	–0.4
Registered electors		3,722		
Reform gain from Labour		Swing	▲41.4	

=== Druridge Bay ===
Druridge Bay
Party	Candidate	Votes	%	±%
Labour	Scott Dickinson*	651	50.0	–9.2
Reform	Michael Joyce	488	37.5	N/A
Conservative	Anne-Marie Trevelyan	163	12.5	–19.5
Majority		163	12.5	–14.7
Turnout		1,316	37.6	+3.1
Registered electors		3,503		
Labour hold				

=== Haltwhistle ===
Haltwhistle
Party	Candidate	Votes	%	±%
Labour	Rachel Mathieson	612	38.5	+4.2
Conservative	Ian Hutchinson	505	31.8	–26.7
Reform	Adam Howells	471	29.7	N/A
Majority		107	6.7	N/A
Turnout		1,594	44.1	+5.8
Registered electors		3,613		
Labour gain from Conservative		Swing	▲15.5	

=== Hartley ===
Hartley
Party	Candidate	Votes	%	±%
Reform	Stephen Flower	626	35.5	N/A
Conservative	Jill Henderson	551	31.3	–15.9
Labour	Sean Cassidy	469	26.6	–20.5
Green	Nigel Szczepaniak	116	6.6	N/A
Majority		75	4.2	N/A
Turnout		1,767	43.4	
Registered electors		4,074		
Reform gain from Conservative				

=== Haydon ===
Haydon
Party	Candidate	Votes	%	±%
Reform	Sonia Simm	631	46.0	N/A
Labour	Brian Gallacher*	600	43.7	–24.7
Conservative	John McConnell	141	10.3	–20.9
Majority		31	2.3	N/A
Turnout		1,384	38.0	
Registered electors		3,639		
Reform gain from Labour				

=== Haydon & Hadrian ===
Haydon & Hadrian
Party	Candidate	Votes	%	±%
Liberal Democrats	Alan Sharp*	882	56.9	+5.8
Reform	Andrew Hickman	293	18.9	N/A
Labour	Malcolm Ellis	126	8.1	–5.7
Conservative	Tarun Seghal	122	7.9	–21.9
Green	Jon Price	76	4.9	–0.4
Independent	Jevon Scudamore	52	3.4	N/A
Majority		589	38.0	+16.6
Turnout		1,552	42.6	–2.6
Registered electors		3,642		
Liberal Democrats hold				

=== Hexham East ===
Hexham East
Party	Candidate	Votes	%	±%
Liberal Democrats	Suzanne Fairless-Aitken	474	31.7	–3.8
Conservative	Simon Kitchen	340	22.7	–21.1
Reform	Katherine Hales	336	22.5	N/A
Labour	Susan Davey	224	15.0	–5.6
Green	Guy Norfolk	122	8.2	N/A
Majority		134	9.0	N/A
Turnout		1,503	39.8	–5.0
Registered electors		3,781		
Liberal Democrats gain from Conservative		Swing	▲8.7	

=== Hexham North ===
Hexham North
Party	Candidate	Votes	%
Conservative	Trevor Cessford*	422	29.2
Labour	Wendy Wood	410	28.4
Reform	Avril Elliott	254	17.6
Liberal Democrats	Nick Cott	237	16.4
Green	Paul Homer	120	8.3
Majority		12	0.8
Turnout		1,447	42.7
Registered electors		3,391	
Conservative win (new seat)			

=== Hexham West ===
Hexham West
Party	Candidate	Votes	%	±%
Independent	Derek Kennedy*	800	45.6	–23.7
Labour	Nigel Porter	272	15.5	+6.5
Reform	Richard Arthur	255	14.5	N/A
Conservative	Christine Hanley	186	10.6	–6.7
Liberal Democrats	Ginnie O'Farrell	128	7.3	N/A
Green	John McKee	112	6.4	+2.0
Majority		528	30.1	–21.9
Turnout		1,765	51.4	
Registered electors		3,433		
Independent hold		Swing	▼15.1	

=== Hirst ===
Hirst
Party	Candidate	Votes	%	±%
Reform	John Allen	434	50.0	+38.7
Labour Co-op	Ken Parry*	374	43.1	–28.8
Conservative	Gail Weddel	60	6.9	–9.9
Majority		60	6.9	N/A
Turnout		875	25.4	+1.1
Registered electors		3,448		
Reform gain from Labour Co-op		Swing	▲33.8	

=== Holywell ===
Holywell
Party	Candidate	Votes	%	±%
Labour	Les Bowman*	630	41.1	–15.9
Reform	Ian MacGregor	547	35.7	N/A
Conservative	Rob Forsyth	357	23.3	–13.6
Majority		83	5.4	–14.8
Turnout		1,542	39.8	
Registered electors		3,872		
Labour hold				

=== Humshaugh ===
Humshaugh
Party	Candidate	Votes	%	±%
Green	Antonia Azocar-Nevin	800	48.0	–4.2
Conservative	Greg Munro	463	27.8	–14.5
Reform	Hans Berges	311	18.7	N/A
Labour	Michael Smith	68	4.1	+0.1
Animal Welfare	Lee Williscroft-Ferris	25	1.5	N/A
Majority		337	20.2	+10.2
Turnout		1,673	49.1	–10.3
Registered electors		3,406		
Green hold		Swing	▲5.2	

=== Isabella ===
Isabella
Party	Candidate	Votes	%	±%
Reform	David Johnson	579	55.0	N/A
Labour Co-op	Anna Watson*	396	37.6	–21.0
Conservative	Andrew Liddle	78	7.4	–34.0
Majority		183	17.4	N/A
Turnout		1,059	31.4	+4.4
Registered electors		3,369		
Reform gain from Labour				

=== Longhirst ===
Longhirst
Party	Candidate	Votes	%
Conservative	Ed Dungait	562	38.7
Reform	Matthew Gray	482	33.2
Labour	Mark Gerrard	305	21.0
Liberal Democrats	David Moore	102	7.0
Majority		80	5.5
Turnout		1,454	39.7
Registered electors		3,667	
Conservative win (new seat)			

=== Longhorsley ===
Longhorsley
Party	Candidate	Votes	%	±%
Conservative	Glen Sanderson	879	51.1	–22.9
Reform	Susan Spencer	347	20.2	N/A
Labour	Keith Trobe	300	17.4	–1.2
Green	Philip Hood	108	6.3	N/A
Liberal Democrats	Neil Salvesen	87	5.1	–2.3
Majority		532	30.9	–24.6
Turnout		1,724	48.4	+3.4
Registered electors		3,565		
Conservative hold				

=== Longhoughton ===
Longhoughton
Party	Candidate	Votes	%	±%
Conservative	Wendy Pattison*	752	42.9	–17.0
Reform	Brian Tait	369	21.1	N/A
Liberal Democrats	Richard Brewis	254	14.5	–16.8
Labour	Charles Thompson	223	12.7	+3.9
Green	Rosemary Mackenzie	153	8.7	N/A
Majority		383	21.8	–6.8
Turnout		1,755	44.7	–2.8
Registered electors		3,929		
Conservative hold				

=== Lynemouth ===
Lynemouth
Party	Candidate	Votes	%	±%
Labour Co-op	Liz Dunn*	655	47.4	–9.9
Reform	Dan Taylor	574	41.5	N/A
Conservative	Liz Rixon	154	11.1	–26.7
Majority		81	5.9	–13.6
Turnout		1,389	36.4	
Registered electors		3,812		
Labour Co-op hold				

=== Morpeth Kirkhill ===
Morpeth Kirkhill
Party	Candidate	Votes	%	±%
Conservative	Richard Wearmouth*	807	45.5	–11.2
Liberal Democrats	Dorothy Moore	337	19.0	+6.2
Reform	Gillian Caldwell	285	16.1	N/A
Labour	Brooke Burgess	270	15.2	–4.4
Green	Pete Burns	76	4.3	–6.5
Majority		470	26.5	–10.6
Turnout		1,783	45.0	–0.3
Registered electors		3,959		
Conservative hold		Swing	▼8.7	

=== Morpeth North ===
Morpeth North
Party	Candidate	Votes	%	±%
Conservative	David Bawn*	819	40.4	–13.5
Labour Co-op	Jo Crumplin	368	18.2	–11.7
Liberal Democrats	Natalie Younges	290	14.3	N/A
Green	Jan Rosen	282	13.9	–2.4
Reform	Garry Featherstone	266	13.1	N/A
Majority		451	22.2	–1.8
Turnout		2,032	51.0	–3.0
Registered electors		3,985		
Conservative hold		Swing	▼0.9	

=== Morpeth Stobhill ===
Morpeth Stobhill
Party	Candidate	Votes	%	±%
Conservative	John Benyon*	605	34.1	–13.4
Liberal Democrats	Alison Byard	487	27.5	+0.3
Reform	Neil Cox	318	17.9	N/A
Labour Co-op	Ian Lindley	261	14.7	–4.5
Green	Patricia Fuller	64	3.6	–2.5
Independent	Derek Thompson	39	2.2	N/A
Majority		118	6.6	–13.7
Turnout		1,779	47.4	–1.9
Registered electors		3,753		
Conservative hold		Swing	▼6.9	

=== Newbiggin-by-the-Sea ===
Newbiggin-by-the-Sea
Party	Candidate	Votes	%
Reform	Ben Audsley	521	37.2
Independent	Ami Wootton	338	24.1
Labour	Michelle Embleton	269	19.2
Independent	Liz Simpson*	147	10.5
Independent	Sonia Anderson	86	6.1
Conservative	Jonathan Richardson	39	2.8
Majority		183	13.1
Turnout		1,405	36.7
Registered electors		3,826	
Reform win (new seat)			

=== Newsham ===
Newsham
Party	Candidate	Votes	%	±%
Reform	Barry Elliott	489	38.1	N/A
Labour	Deirdre Campbell	434	33.8	–11.1
Conservative	Ian Levy	360	28.1	–17.8
Majority		55	4.3	N/A
Turnout		1,289	30.4	–0.9
Registered electors		4,247		
Reform gain from Conservative				

=== Norham & Islandshires ===
Norham & Islandshires
Party	Candidate	Votes	%	±%
Reform	Patrick Lambert	516	31.6	N/A
Conservative	Colin Hardy*	478	29.3	–8.6
Independent	Ged Thomas	415	25.4	+6.2
Labour	Linda Lindley	224	13.7	+3.3
Majority		38	2.3	N/A
Turnout		1,635	45.9	+0.5
Registered electors		3,562		
Reform gain from Conservative				

=== Pegswood ===
Pegswood
Party	Candidate	Votes	%	±%
Labour	Vicky Oakley	467	41.5	–0.1
Reform	Christopher Croft	367	32.6	N/A
Conservative	Sarah Legge	291	25.9	–28.3
Majority		100	8.9	N/A
Turnout		1,132	37.1	
Registered electors		3,054		
Labour gain from Conservative				

=== Plessey ===
Plessey
Party	Candidate	Votes	%	±%
Reform	David Swinhoe	639	40.3	+36.0
Conservative	Caitlin Jones	552	34.8	+2.6
Labour	Daniel Fraser	396	25.0	–1.0
Majority		87	5.5	N/A
Turnout		1,589	46.2	
Registered electors		3,438		
Reform gain from Liberal Democrats		Swing	▲16.7	

=== Ponteland East & Stannington ===
Ponteland East & Stannington
Party	Candidate	Votes	%	±%
Conservative	Lyle Darwin*	641	39.2	–30.7
Reform	Karen Carins	544	33.3	N/A
Labour	Anne Batchelor	195	11.9	–2.9
Green	Lizzie Boyes	138	8.4	N/A
Liberal Democrats	Penny Reid	118	7.2	–8.1
Majority		97	5.9	–48.6
Turnout		1,638	43.0	
Registered electors		3,811		
Conservative hold				

=== Ponteland North ===
Ponteland North
Party	Candidate	Votes	%	±%
Conservative	Richard Dodd*	642	45.0	–28.9
Reform	David Nicholson	451	31.6	N/A
Labour Co-op	Robert Turner	144	10.1	–4.8
Liberal Democrats	Helen Lewins	113	7.9	–3.3
Green	Glyn Evans	76	5.3	N/A
Majority		191	13.4	–45.7
Turnout		1,429	36.2	–3.3
Registered electors		3,952		
Conservative hold				

=== Ponteland South with Heddon ===
Ponteland South with Heddon
Party	Candidate	Votes	%	±%
Conservative	Michaela Horncastle	866	49.2	–18.6
Reform	Gary Knight	429	24.4	N/A
Labour	Margaret Jackson	246	14.0	–8.0
Liberal Democrats	Benjamin Mitchell	118	6.7	–3.4
Green	Eileen Sutherland	101	5.7	N/A
Majority		437	24.8	–21.0
Turnout		1,763	44.0	+0.5
Registered electors		4,003		
Conservative hold				

=== Ponteland West ===
Ponteland West
Party	Candidate	Votes	%	±%
Conservative	Veronica Jones*	649	47.0	–26.9
Reform	Neil Miller	384	27.8	N/A
Labour	Michael Clarke	216	15.6	–2.9
Liberal Democrats	Jim Greer	133	9.6	+2.0
Majority		265	19.2	–36.2
Turnout		1,386	37.0	–1.2
Registered electors		3,750		
Conservative hold				

=== Prudhoe North & Wylam ===
Prudhoe North & Wylam
Party	Candidate	Votes	%
Labour	Lawrence O'Donnell	679	37.5
Independent	Holly Waddell	475	26.2
Reform	Andrew Lapping	327	18.1
Conservative	Shaun Parsons	271	15.0
Liberal Democrats	Stuart Rowlands	58	3.2
Majority		204	11.3
Turnout		1,814	45.9
Registered electors		3,950	
Labour win (new seat)			

=== Prudhoe South ===
Prudhoe South
Party	Candidate	Votes	%	±%
Conservative	Gordon Stewart*	513	40.0	–19.7
Labour	Dorothy Dickinson	476	37.2	+0.8
Reform	Francis Miles	292	22.8	N/A
Majority		37	2.8	–20.5
Turnout		1,287	33.7	
Registered electors		3,824		
Conservative hold		Swing	▼10.3	

=== Prudhoe West & Mickley ===
Prudhoe West & Mickley
Party	Candidate	Votes	%
Labour	Angie Scott*	719	45.8
Reform	Lynne Paley	428	27.2
Conservative	Tracy Gilmore	424	27.0
Majority		291	18.6
Turnout		1,587	41.0
Registered electors		3,871	
Labour win (new seat)			

=== Rothbury ===
Rothbury
Party	Candidate	Votes	%	±%
Independent	Steven Bridgett*	1,120	44.6	–35.1
Liberal Democrats	Colin Davis	471	18.7	N/A
Reform	Mark Hope	370	14.7	N/A
Conservative	Paul Howey	201	8.0	–0.1
Majority	Karen Weech	127	5.1	N/A
Independent	Peter Dawson	98	3.9	N/A
Labour	Mary Finn	65	2.6	–5.3
Green	Jennifer Wallace	62	2.5	–2.1
Majority		649	25.9	–45.7
Turnout		2,524	61.0	+0.9
Registered electors		4,140		
Independent hold				

=== Seaton with Spital ===
Seaton with Spital
Party	Candidate	Votes	%
Reform	Karl Green	575	53.7
Labour	Graeme Wright	375	35.0
Conservative	David Ferguson	121	11.3
Majority		200	18.7
Turnout		1,076	27.4
Registered electors		3,932	
Reform win (new seat)			

=== Seghill with Seaton Delaval ===
Seghill with Seaton Delaval
Party	Candidate	Votes	%	±%
Conservative	Eve Chicken	617	44.1	–10.4
Reform	Darrell Frost	403	28.8	N/A
Labour	Sue Bowman	293	20.9	–24.6
Green	Martin Williams	86	6.1	N/A
Majority		214	15.3	+6.4
Turnout		1,403	34.7	–0.5
Registered electors		4,041		
Conservative hold				

=== Shilbottle ===
Shilbottle
Party	Candidate	Votes	%	±%
Conservative	Trevor Thorne*	540	35.0	–19.3
Reform	Howard Denby	438	28.4	N/A
Liberal Democrats	Elizabeth Whitelam	306	19.8	+4.6
Labour	Adelina Goddard	259	16.8	–3.8
Majority		102	6.6	–27.1
Turnout		1,546	43.8	–0.2
Registered electors		3,533		
Conservative hold				

=== Sleekburn ===
Sleekburn
Party	Candidate	Votes	%	±%
Reform	Roger Spriddell	674	57.7	N/A
Labour	Alex Wallace*	392	33.5	–11.6
Conservative	Maureen Rolf	103	8.8	–18.6
Majority		282	24.2	N/A
Turnout		1,172	32.4	+3.8
Registered electors		3,619		
Reform gain from Labour				

=== South Blyth ===
South Blyth
Party	Candidate	Votes	%	±%
Conservative	Daniel Carr*	924	58.5	–14.5
Reform	Tracey Elliott	331	21.0	N/A
Labour	Robert Spence	220	13.9	–3.8
Liberal Democrats	Alisdair Gibbs-Barton	59	3.7	–3.8
Green	Elaine Kilroy	45	2.8	N/A
Majority		593	37.5	N/A
Turnout		1,596	41.0	
Registered electors		3,891		
Conservative hold				

=== South Tynedale ===
South Tynedale
Party	Candidate	Votes	%	±%
Conservative	Colin Horncastle*	871	45.8	–11.5
Reform	Andrew Saunders	464	24.4	N/A
Labour	Bradley Lloyd	334	17.6	–5.9
Green	Theodora Thompson	231	12.2	–0.8
Majority		407	21.4	–12.4
Turnout		1,917	48.9	+4.7
Registered electors		3,918		
Conservative hold				

=== Stakeford ===
Stakeford
Party	Candidate	Votes	%	±%
Reform	Martin Jackson	705	49.1	N/A
Labour	Julie Foster*	545	37.9	–16.2
Conservative	Jade Crawford	187	13.0	–32.9
Majority		160	11.2	N/A
Turnout		1,443	39.8	±0.0
Registered electors		3,624		
Reform gain from Labour				

=== Stocksfield & Bywell ===
Stocksfield & Bywell
Party	Candidate	Votes	%
Independent	Anne Dale	1,030	58.7
Liberal Democrats	Kevin Graham	245	14.0
Reform	Keller Fong	188	10.7
Conservative	Ros Munro	159	9.1
Labour	Trevor Robertson	134	7.6
Majority		785	44.7
Turnout		1,757	50.9
Registered electors		3,451	
Independent win (new seat)			

=== Wensleydale ===
Wensleydale
Party	Candidate	Votes	%	±%
Reform	Natalie Rolls	627	46.2	N/A
Labour	Eileen Cartie*	583	42.9	–11.8
Conservative	Sam Liddle	148	10.9	–30.9
Majority		44	3.3	N/A
Turnout		1,359	38.4	+4.8
Registered electors		3,536		
Reform gain from Labour				

=== Wooler ===
Wooler
Party	Candidate	Votes	%	±%
Conservative	Mark Mather*	1,301	64.1	–12.7
Reform	Anthony Robb	427	21.0	N/A
Labour	Sandra Dickinson	175	8.6	+0.5
Green	Maurice Ward	110	5.4	–0.1
Heritage	Mark de Fusco	16	0.8	N/A
Majority		874	43.1	–25.6
Turnout		2,039	49.0	+3.4
Registered electors		4,162		
Conservative hold				

== Changes 2025–2029 ==
- 21 May 2025: Steven Bridgett (elected as an independent, Rothbury) declines to join the Independent Group, alleging a "deal" between the Independent, Green and Liberal Democrat groups and the Conservatives; sits non-aligned
- 19 September 2025: John Allen (Reform UK, Hirst) has the whip suspended pending investigation, after online comments were attributed to him about shooting the Prime Minister
- 29 September 2025: Nicole Brooke (Reform UK, Berwick North) and Patrick Lambert (Reform UK, Norham and Islandshires) have the whip suspended pending investigation for breaching Reform group rules
- 9 October 2025: Scott Lee (elected as an independent, Cramlington East & Double Row) joins the Conservative Party
- October 2025: Brooke and Lambert are expelled from Reform UK; Lambert denies wrongdoing and appeals
- 22 October 2025: Allen is expelled from Reform UK "for bringing the party into disrepute"; sits non-aligned
- 24 October 2025: Brooke and Lambert join the Independent Group
- 29 July 2026: Arty Hume (Reform UK, Amble) dies in office; a by-election is pending

=== By-elections ===
==== Cramlington South West ====
The by-election was triggered by the resignation of Reform UK councillor Shaun Knowles in February 2026, who cited a kidney cancer diagnosis and a family bereavement; he had previously faced criticism over poor attendance.

Cramlington South West, 16 April 2026
Party	Candidate	Votes	%	±%
Conservative	Neil Graham	278	34.2	+9.0
Reform	Bridget Byrne	212	26.1	−13.3
Labour	Lynne Robinson	187	23.0	−5.8
Green	Alex Phimister	116	14.3	N/A
Independent	Dawn Furness	13	1.6	N/A
Liberal Democrats	Nick Cott	7	0.9	N/A
Majority		66	8.1	
Turnout		816	26.9	
Registered electors		3,036		
Conservative gain from Reform		Swing		

==== Amble ====
The by-election was triggered by the death of Reform UK councillor Arty Hume, aged 71, on 29 July 2026.

Amble by-election, 1st October 2026
Party	Candidate	Votes	%	±%
Labour	Amy Spriggs	439	38.8	+0.4
Reform	Warren Ladyman	379	33.5	−10.9
Conservative	Jenny Richards	237	21.0	+3.8
Restore	Michael Joyce	76	6.7	New
Majority		60	5.3	N/A
Rejected ballots		1	0.1	
Registered electors		3,692		
Turnout		1,132	30.7	−1.1
Labour gain from Reform		Swing	+5.7	

==== Hirst ====
The by-election was triggered after Independent councillor John Allen was disqualified for failing to attend a council meeting for six months. Allen was originally elected for Reform UK, though was suspended from that party following allegations of death threats directed towards former Prime Minister Keir Starmer.

Hirst by-election, 1st October 2026
Party	Candidate	Votes	%	±%
Labour	Melanie Fox	350	50.1	+7.0
Reform	Kerry Davison	210	30.0	−20.0
Restore	Eden Webley	72	10.3	New
Conservative	David Ferguson	29	4.1	−2.8
Liberal Democrats	Calvin Clark	27	3.9	New
Independent	John Allen	11	1.6	New
Majority		140	20.0	N/A
Rejected ballots		1	0.1	
Turnout		700	20.5	−4.9
Registered electors		3,408		
Labour gain from Reform		Swing	+13.5	

== See also ==
- Northumberland County Council elections
