= Berwick Academy, Berwick-upon-Tweed =

Berwick Academy

Location
- Adams Drive; Berwick-upon-Tweed; Northumberland, TD15 2JF; England
- 55.75566°N 2.00344°W

Information
- Type: Academy
- Local authority: Northumberland
- Department for Education URN: 137598 Tables
- Ofsted: Reports
- Headteacher: Ben Ryder
- Gender: Coeducational
- Age: 13 to 18
- Website: http://www.berwickacademy.co.uk/

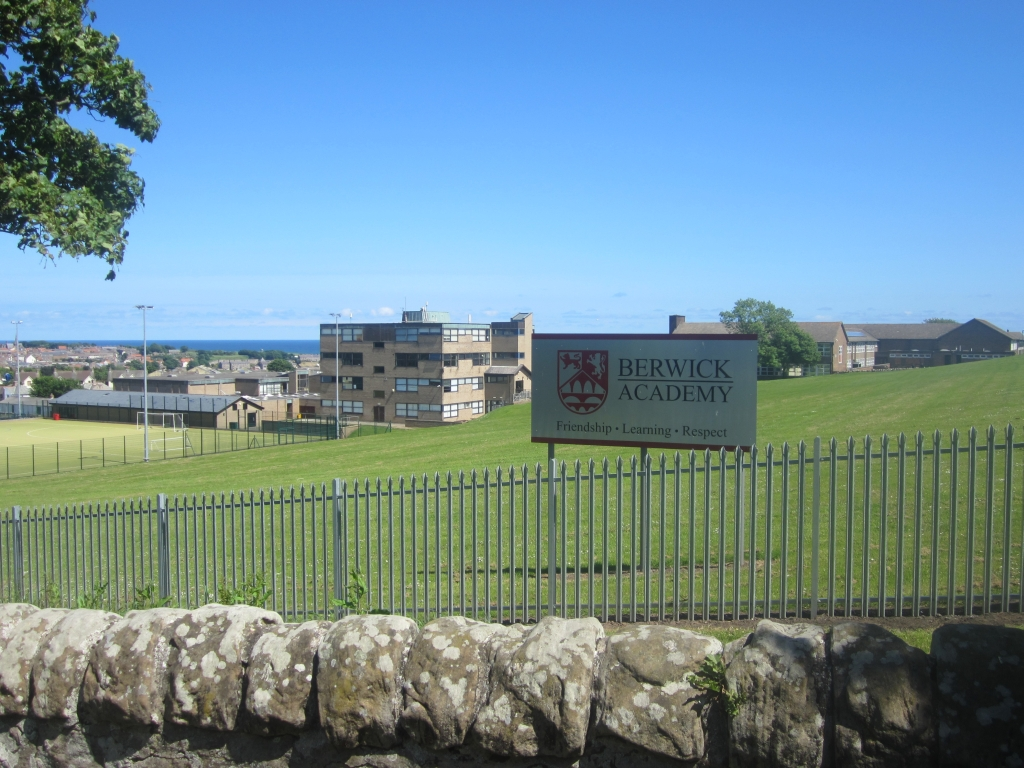

Berwick Academy (formerly Berwick Community High School) is a coeducational upper school and sixth form located in Berwick-upon-Tweed in the English county of Northumberland. on the border with Scotland.

Previously a community school administered by Northumberland County Council, Berwick Community High School converted to academy status in November 2011 and was renamed Berwick Academy. However the school continues to coordinate with Northumberland County Council for admissions.

Berwick Academy offers GCSEs and BTECs as programmes of study for pupils, while students in the sixth form have the option to study from a range of A-levels.

As of 2025, the school's most recent Ofsted inspection was in 2024, with a judgement of 'requires improvement'. The school was rated 'inadequate' in 2018. The Guardian reported the school's ongoing struggle with behaviour, funding and staffing in 2017.

The academy is currently undergoing a transition into being a secondary school under the Berwick Partnership's new two-tier education system and will be rebuilt with updated facilities and grounds on the same site, at a cost of £42.6 million.

== Alumni ==
The alumni of Berwick Academy, previously known as Berwick-upon-Tweed Community High School before 2011 include:

- Jeremy Purvis, MSP for Tweeddale, Ettrick and Lauderdale between 2003 and 2011; made a life peer in 2013 and currently sits in the House of Lords as a Liberal Democrat.
