= 1973 Northumberland County Council election =

1973 UK local government election

12 April 1973	1977 →

All 62 seats to Northumberland County Council 32 seats needed for a majority
	First party	Second party
Party	Labour	Independent
Seats won	28	21
Popular vote	34,313	19,902
Percentage	47.4%	27.5%
	Third party	Fourth party
Party	Conservative	Liberal
Seats won	10	3
Popular vote	10,881	6,756
Percentage	15.0%	9.3%
Control of Council after election
No overall control

Local elections to Northumberland County Council, a county council in the north east of England, were held on 12 April 1973, resulting in a council with no party forming a majority.

== Results ==
1973 Northumberland County Council election
Party	Seats	Gains	Losses	Net gain/loss	Seats %	Votes %	Votes	+/−
Labour	28					47.4	34,313	
Independent	21					27.5	19,902	
Conservative	10					15.0	10,881	
Liberal	3					9.3	6,756	
Independent Socialist	0					0.8	564	
