= 1977 Northumberland County Council election =

1977 UK local government election

← 1973	5 May 1977	1981 →

All 62 seats to Northumberland County Council 32 seats needed for a majority
	First party	Second party	Third party
Party	Labour	Conservative	Independent
Last election	28	10	21
Seats won	21	20	15
Seat change	▼7	▲10	▼6
Popular vote	22,836	18,912	11,059
Percentage	33.6%	27.8%	16.3%
	Fourth party	Fifth party
Party	Independent Labour	Ind. Conservative
Last election	0	0
Seats won	4	2
Seat change	▲4	▲2
Popular vote	4,742	0^{a}
Percentage	7.0%	0.0%
Control of Council before election
No overall control
Control of Council after election
No overall control

Local elections to Northumberland County Council, a county council in the north east of England, were held on 5 May 1977, resulting in a council with no party forming a majority.

== Results ==
Northumberland County Council election, 1977 Turnout: 43.8%
Party	Seats	Gains	Losses	Net gain/loss	Seats %	Votes %	Votes	+/−
Labour	21			▼8	33.9	33.6	22,836	▼13.8
Conservative	20			▲10	32.3	27.8	18,912	▲12.8
Independent	15			▼6	24.2	16.3	11,059	▼11.2
Independent Labour	4	4	0	▲4	6.5	7.0	4,742	New
Ind. Conservative	2	2	0	▲2	3.2	0.0	0^{a}	New
Liberal	0			▼3	0.0	14.7	9,971	▲5.4
Communist	0			0	0.0	0.6	395	New

^{a} Two Independent Conservative councillors were elected unopposed, hence received no votes.
