= 1989 Northumberland County Council election =

1989 UK local government election

← 1985	4 May 1989	1993 →

All 66 seats to Northumberland County Council 34 seats needed for a majority
- Turnout: 37.5%
	First party	Second party
Party	Labour	Conservative
Last election	30	12
Seats won	38	17
Seat change	▲8	▲5
Popular vote	35,288	20,346
Percentage	40.4%	23.3%
	Third party	Fourth party
Party	Liberal Democrats	Independent
Last election	20	3
Seats won	8	3
Seat change	▼12	0
Popular vote	24,782	3,546
Percentage	28.3%	4.1%
- Map of the results of the 1989 local election.
Control of Council before election
No overall control
Control of Council after election
Labour Party

Local elections to Northumberland County Council, a county council in the north east of England, were held on 4 May 1989, resulting in a council with Labour members forming a majority.

== Results ==
Northumberland County Council election, 1989
Party	Seats	Gains	Losses	Net gain/loss	Seats %	Votes %	Votes	+/−
Labour	38			▲8	57.6	40.4	35,288	▲2.9
Conservative	17			▲5	25.8	23.3	20,346	▲2.8
SLD	8			▼12	12.1	28.3	24,782	▼7.2
Independent	3			0	4.5	4.1	3,546	▼1.3
Green	0			0	0.0	0.8	701	▲0.7
SDP	0			0	0.0	2.3	2,017	New
Liberal	0			0	0.0	0.6	774	New
