= 1985 Northumberland County Council election =

1985 UK local government election

← 1981	2 May 1985	1989 →

All 66 seats to Northumberland County Council 34 seats needed for a majority
- Turnout: 41.0%
	First party	Second party	Third party
Party	Labour	Alliance	Conservative
Last election	34	15	14
Seats won	30	20	12
Seat change	▼4	▲5	▼2
Popular vote	35,498	33,570	19,400
Percentage	37.5%	35.5%	20.5%
	Fourth party	Fifth party
Party	Independent	Ind. Conservative
Last election	2	0
Seats won	3	1
Seat change	▲1	▲1
Popular vote	8,302	851
Percentage	5.4%	0.9%
- Map of the results of the 1985 local election.
Control of Council before election
Labour Party
Control of Council after election
No overall control

Local elections to Northumberland County Council, a county council in the north east of England, were held on 2 May 1985. The Labour Party lost overall control of the council, which fell under no overall control.

== Results ==
Northumberland County Council election, 1985 Turnout: 43.7%
Party	Seats	Gains	Losses	Net gain/loss	Seats %	Votes %	Votes	+/−
Labour	30			▼4	45.5	37.5	35,498	▼0.5
Alliance	20^{a}			▲5	30.3	35.5^{b}	33,570	▲8.2
Conservative	12			▼2	18.2	20.5	19,400	▼5.7
Independent	3			▲1	4.5	6.4	5,097	▼2.1
Ind. Conservative	1			▲1	1.5	0.9	851	New
Ecology	0			0	0.0	0.1	135	0.0

^a 17 Liberal, 3 SDP
^b 27.6 Liberal, 7.9 SDP
