= 1981 Northumberland County Council election =

1981 UK local government election

← 1977	7 May 1981	1985 →

All 66 seats to Northumberland County Council 34 seats needed for a majority
	First party	Second party
Party	Labour	Liberal
Last election	21	0
Seats won	34	15
Seat change	▲13	▲15
Popular vote	38,724	27,822
Percentage	38.0%	27.3%
	Third party	Fourth party
Party	Conservative	Independent
Last election	20	15
Seats won	14	3
Seat change	▼6	▼12
Popular vote	26,678	8,302
Percentage	26.2%	8.2%
- Map of the results of the 1981 local election.
Control of Council before election
No overall control
Control of Council after election
Labour Party

Local elections to Northumberland County Council, a county council in the north east of England, were held on 7 May 1981, resulting in a council with Labour members forming a majority.

== Results ==
Northumberland County Council election, 1981
Party	Seats	Gains	Losses	Net gain/loss	Seats %	Votes %	Votes	+/−
Labour	34			▲13	51.5	38.0	38,724	▲4.4
Liberal	15			▲15	22.7	27.3	27,822	▲12.6
Conservative	14			▼6	21.2	26.2	26,678	▼1.6
Independent	3			▼12	4.5	8.2	8,302	▼8.1
Ecology	0			0	0.0	0.1	94	New
Independent Labour	0			▼4	0.0	0.2	185	▼6.8
Independent Social Democrat	0			0	0.0	0.0	32	New
