= 1993 Northumberland County Council election =

1993 UK local government election

← 1989	6 May 1993	1997 →

All 66 seats to Northumberland County Council 34 seats needed for a majority
- Turnout: 32.5%
	First party	Second party
Party	Labour	Conservative
Last election	38	17
Seats won	39	13
Seat change	▲1	▼4
Popular vote	29,032	21,603
Percentage	37.4%	27.8%
	Third party	Fourth party
Party	Liberal Democrats	Independent
Last election	8	3
Seats won	11	3
Seat change	▲3	0
Popular vote	22,377	3,863
Percentage	28.8%	5.0%
- Map of the results of the 1993 local election.
Control of Council before election
No overall control
Labour Party
Labour Party

Local elections to Northumberland County Council, a county council in the north east of England, were held on 6 May 1993, resulting in a council with Labour members forming a majority.

== Results ==
Northumberland County Council election, 1993
Party	Seats	Gains	Losses	Net gain/loss	Seats %	Votes %	Votes	+/−
Labour	39			▲1	59.1	37.4	29,032	▼2.9
Conservative	13			▼4	19.7	27.8	21,603	▲4.6
Liberal Democrats	11			▲3	16.7	28.8	22,377	▲0.5
Independent	5			▲2	4.5	5.0	3,863	▼2.3
Green	0			0	0.0	0.9	699	▲0.1
