= 2021 Northumberland County Council election =

2021 UK local government election

- 6 May 2021

All 67 seats to Northumberland County Council 34 seats needed for a majority
	First party	Second party
Leader	Glen Sanderson	Susan Dungworth (Defeated)
Party	Conservative	Labour
Leader's seat	Longhorsley	Hartley
Last election	33	24
Seats won	34	21
Seat change	▲1	▼3
Popular vote	46,681	31,180
Percentage	45.73	30.54
	Third party	Fourth party	Fifth party
Leader	Derek Kennedy	Jeff Reid	none
Party	Independent	Liberal Democrats	Green
Leader's seat	Hexham West	Plessey	none
Last election	7	3	0
Seats won	7	3	2
Seat change	Steady	Steady	▲2
Popular vote	9,831	8,393	5,285
Percentage	9.63	8.22	5.18
- Map of the results of the 2021 local election.
Control of Council before election
No overall control
Control of Council after election
Conservative

An election for the Northumberland County Council took place on 6 May 2021 as part of the 2021 local elections in the United Kingdom. All 67 councillors were elected from 66 electoral divisions which returned either one or two county councillors each by first-past-the-post voting for a four-year term of office.

The results saw the Conservative Party win 34 seats, a bare majority.

== Results ==
Northumberland County Council Election Result 2021
Party	Seats	Gains	Losses	Net gain/loss	Seats %	Votes %	Votes	+/−
Conservative	34	6	5	+1	50.75	45.73	46,681	+1.68
Labour	21	3	6	-3	31.34	30.55	31,180	+3.68
Independent	7	1	1	N/C	10.45	9.63	9,831	-0.27
Liberal Democrats	3	1	1	N/C	4.47	8.22	8,393	-3.84
Green	2	2	0	+2	2.99	5.18	5,285	+2.98
Reform	0	-	-	0	0.00	0.40	408	New
SDP	0	-	-	0	0.00	0.20	206	New
No description	0	-	-	0	0.00	0.08	79	-1.66
CPA	0	-	-	0	0.00	0.02	17	+0.17

== Council Composition ==
Following the previous election in 2017, the composition of the council was:

↓
33	24	7	3
Conservative	Labour	Ind	LD

After the election, the composition of the council was:

↓
34	21	7	3	2
Conservative	Labour	Ind	LD	G

Ind - Independent
LD - Liberal Democrats
G - Green Party

== Ward results ==
=== Alnwick ===
Alnwick (2 seats)
Party	Candidate	Votes	%	±%
Conservative	Gordon Castle	1,834	53.5	
Green	Martin Swinbank	1,671	48.7	New
Conservative	Reuben Carr	1112	32.4	
Labour	Peter Burns	701	20.4	
Labour	Julia Lyford	485	14.1	
Liberal Democrats	Jennifer Eckersley	457	13.3	
Majority		163		
Turnout		3,439	42.13	
Conservative hold		Swing		
Green gain from Conservative		Swing		

=== Amble ===
Amble (1 seat)
Party	Candidate	Votes	%	±%
Labour	Terry Clark	635	51.3	▼0.1
Conservative	June Watson	540	43.7	▲6.4
Liberal Democrats	David Woodard	62	5.0	▼6.3
Majority		95	6.3	▼6.3
Turnout		1,245	31.3	
Labour hold		Swing		

=== Amble West with Warkworth ===
Amble West with Warkworth (1 seat)
Party	Candidate	Votes	%	±%
Conservative	Jeff Watson	766	51.5	▼4.2
Liberal Democrats	John Wilson	438	29.4	▲12.6
Labour	Michael Joyce	284	19.1	▲7.2
Majority		328	22.0	▼1.4
Turnout		1,499	42.5	
Conservative hold		Swing		

=== Ashington Central ===
Ashington Central (1 seat)
Party	Candidate	Votes	%	±%
Labour	Caroline Ball	551	55.8	▼23.8
Green	Michelle Brannigan	264	26.7	New
Conservative	Cheryl Watson	156	15.8	▼4.6
CPA	Michael Flynn	17	1.7	New
Majority		287	29.0	▼30.1
Turnout		995	30.1	
Labour hold		Swing		

=== Bamburgh ===
Bamburgh (1 seat)
Party	Candidate	Votes	%	±%
Conservative	Guy Renner-Thompson	1,085	71.2	▼0.3
Labour	Mick McCarthy	239	15.7	▼5.7
Liberal Democrats	Kate Cairns	200	13.1	▼5.9
Majority		846	55.5	▼5.4
Turnout		1,538	42.8	
Conservative hold		Swing		

=== Bedlington Central ===
Bedlington Central (1 seat)
Party	Candidate	Votes	%	±%
Independent	Christine Taylor	623	48.2	▼12.5
Labour	Brian Johnstone	419	32.4	▲9.1
Conservative	Charlotte Blundred	251	19.4	▲0.1
Majority		204	15.8	▼21.6
Turnout		1,304	34.7	
Independent hold		Swing		

=== Bedlington East ===
Bedlington East (1 seat)
Party	Candidate	Votes	%	±%
Labour	Rebecca Wilczek	436	45.8	▼1.1
Independent	Victoria Thompson	235	24.7	▼26.4
Independent	Mark Wilkinson	171	18.0	New
Conservative	Nadia Zemouri	109	11.5	
Majority		201	21.1	▲8.4
Turnout		957	29.6	
Labour gain from Independent		Swing		

=== Bedlington West ===
Bedlington West (1 seat)
Party	Candidate	Votes	%	±%
Independent	Malcolm Robinson	651	50.7	▲13.3
Labour	Lauren Pitt	368	28.6	▼4.5
Conservative	Elizabeth Rixon	266	20.7	▲11.5
Majority		283	22.0	▲17.7
Turnout		1,290	33.7	
Independent hold		Swing		

=== Bellingham ===
Bellingham (1 seat)
Party	Candidate	Votes	%	±%
Conservative	John Riddle	852	59.6	▼7.5
Liberal Democrats	Kevin Smith	332	23.2	New
Labour	Anne Palmer	246	17.2	▲7.8
Majority		520	36.0	▼7.7
Turnout		1,436	45.9	
Conservative hold		Swing		

=== Berwick East ===
Berwick East (1 seat)
Party	Candidate	Votes	%	±%
Independent	Georgina Hill	934	75.2	▲42.0
Conservative	Amanda Raybould	167	13.4	▼14.8
Green	Thomas Stewart	100	8.1	▼0.8
Liberal Democrats	Liz Whitelam	41	3.3	▼13.3
Majority		767	61.8	▲56.9
Turnout		1,251	35.7	
Independent hold		Swing		

=== Berwick North ===
Berwick North (1 seat)
Party	Candidate	Votes	%	±%
Conservative	Catherine Seymour	499	34.6	▲5.9
Labour Co-op	Rachel Driver	377	26.1	▲22.3
Independent	Shirley Forbes	349	24.2	▲13.3
Independent	Brian Alexander Douglas	127	8.8	▼1.6
Liberal Democrats	Matthew Cooper	91	6.4	▼11.5
Majority		122	8.5	▲8.2
Turnout		1,455	41.5	
Conservative hold		Swing		

=== Berwick West with Ord ===
Berwick West with Ord (1 seat)
Party	Candidate	Votes	%	±%
Liberal Democrats	Elizabeth Isabel Hunter	410	40.0	▼4.6
Conservative	Gregah Roughead	409	39.9	▼8.1
Independent	Robert Bruce	138	13.5	New
Green	Edward Frank	67	6.5	New
Majority		1	0.1	▼3.3
Turnout		1,034	32.1	
Liberal Democrats gain from Conservative		Swing		

=== Bothal ===
Bothal (1 seat)
Party	Candidate	Votes	%	±%
Labour Co-op	Lynne Grimshaw	773	58.7	▲2.4
Conservative	Richard Hunter	323	24.5	▲12.7
Liberal Democrats	Andy McGregor	221	16.8	▼15.0
Majority		450	34.2	▲9.7
Turnout		1,324	34.4	
Labour hold		Swing		

=== Bywell ===
Bywell (1 seat)
Party	Candidate	Votes	%	±%
Labour	Holly Waddell	981	46.5	▲14.5
Conservative	Stephen Westgarth	924	43.8	▲0.5
Green	Martin Davenport	135	6.4	▲1.8
Liberal Democrats	James Grieves	69	3.3	▼16.8
Majority		57	2.2	▼9.1
Turnout		2,115	58.2	
Labour gain from Conservative		Swing		

=== Choppington ===
Choppington (1 seat)
Party	Candidate	Votes	%	±%
Labour	Mary Murphy	429	38.4	▲0.4
Independent	Stephen James Armstrong	411	36.8	▲8.7
Conservative	Aaron Hart	277	24.8	▲6.6
Majority		18	1.6	▼8.4
Turnout		1,123	32.2	
Labour hold		Swing		

=== College ===
College (1 seat)
Party	Candidate	Votes	%	±%
Labour	Mark Purvis	773	74.3	▼4.6
Conservative	Catherine Grieveson	267	25.7	▲4.6
Majority		506	48.7	▼9.0
Turnout		1,052	29.0	
Labour hold		Swing		

=== Corbridge ===
Corbridge (1 seat)
Party	Candidate	Votes	%	±%
Conservative	Nick Oliver	1,016	61.8	▲12.7
Labour	Mary McGlade	240	14.6	▲8.8
Liberal Democrats	Philip Latham	121	7.4	New
SDP	Tom Maskell	116	7.1	New
Green	John Dark	110	6.7	▲3.7
Reform	Mark Griffin	42	2.6	New
Majority		776	47.2	▲40.2
Turnout		1,650	49.5	
Conservative hold		Swing		

=== Cowpen ===
Cowpen (1 seat)
Party	Candidate	Votes	%	±%
Labour	Margaret Richardson	398	47.0	▼6.8
Conservative	Adam Parsons	378	44.7	▲27.3
Independent	Barry Elliott	70	8.3	New
Majority		20	2.4	▼28.0
Turnout		852	26.4	
Labour hold		Swing		

=== Cramlington East ===
Cramlington East (1 seat)
Party	Candidate	Votes	%	±%
Independent	Scott Lee	420	42.3	New
Labour	Ian Swithenbank	386	38.8	▼12.4
Conservative	Maureen Levy	188	18.9	▼18.0
Independent	Dawn Furness	0	0.0	New
Majority		34	3.4	▼11.0
Turnout		1,000	31.4	
Independent gain from Labour		Swing		

=== Cramlington Eastfield ===
Cramlington Eastfield (1 seat)
Party	Candidate	Votes	%	±%
Conservative	Christine Dunbar	873	59.1	▲4.0
Labour	Karen Deagle	444	30.1	▼3.5
Independent	Susan Johnston	159	10.8	▲5.0
Majority		429	29.1	▲7.5
Turnout		1,481	38.0	
Conservative hold		Swing		

=== Cramlington North ===
Cramlington North (1 seat)
Party	Candidate	Votes	%	±%
Conservative	Wayne Daley	1,305	76.8	▼13.2
Labour	Martin Wright	395	23.2	▲13.2
Majority		910	53.5	▼26.6
Turnout		1,709	42.4	
Conservative hold		Swing		

=== Cramlington South East ===
Cramlington South East (1 seat)
Party	Candidate	Votes	%	±%
Conservative	Paul Ezhilchelvan	1,030	61.8	▲27.4
Labour	Allan Hepple	636	38.2	▼5.4
Majority		394	23.6	▲14.4
Turnout		1,687	45.2	
Conservative gain from Labour		Swing		

=== Cramlington Village ===
Cramlington Village (1 seat)
Party	Candidate	Votes	%	±%
Conservative	Mark Swinburn	981	68.4	▲7.1
Labour	Scott White	374	26.1	▲2.0
Green	Ceryn Rowntree	80	5.6	New
Majority		607	42.3	▲5.1
Turnout		1,447	41.7	
Conservative hold		Swing		

=== Cramlington West ===
Cramlington West (1 seat)
Party	Candidate	Votes	%	±%
Conservative	Barry Flux	941	65.4	▼6.8
Labour	Dave Murray	497	34.6	▲6.8
Majority		444	30.9	▼13.4
Turnout		1,450	29.9	
Conservative hold		Swing		

=== Croft ===
Croft (1 seat)
Party	Candidate	Votes	%	±%
Labour	Kath Nisbet	556	60.0	▼0.4
Conservative	Martin Tulip	293	31.6	▲12.6
Reform	Mark Peart	49	5.3	New
Independent	Paul Taylor	28	3.0	New
Majority		263	28.4	▼12.2
Turnout		938	29.9	
Labour hold		Swing		

=== Druridge Bay ===
Druridge Bay (1 seat)
Party	Candidate	Votes	%	±%
Labour	Scott Dickinson	870	59.2	▲4.3
Conservative	Sybil Whiteley	470	32.0	▲14.5
Liberal Democrats	Mary Bambrough	129	8.8	▲2.4
Majority		400	27.2	▼6.5
Turnout		1,474	34.5	
Labour hold		Swing		

=== Haltwhistle ===
Haltwhistle (1 seat)
Party	Candidate	Votes	%	±%
Conservative	James Hutchinson	830	58.5	▼0.4
Labour	John Temple	487	34.3	▲0.4
Liberal Democrats	Avril Grundy	101	7.1	▲4.3
Majority		343	24.2	▼0.8
Turnout		1,427	38.3	
Conservative hold		Swing		

=== Hartley ===
Hartley (1 seat)
Party	Candidate	Votes	%	±%
Conservative	David Ferguson	869	47.2	▲21.7
Labour	Susan Dungworth	868	47.1	▲5.5
Liberal Democrats	Anita Romer	105	5.7	▼6.4
Majority		1	0.1	▼16.0
Turnout		1,858	48.1	
Conservative gain from Labour		Swing		

=== Haydon & Hadrian ===
Haydon & Hadrian (1 seat)
Party	Candidate	Votes	%	±%
Liberal Democrats	Alan Sharp	835	51.1	▲5.6
Conservative	Jan Harding	486	29.8	▼0.9
Labour	David Clegg	225	13.8	▲6.8
Green	Bill Day	87	5.3	▲2.8
Majority		349	21.4	▲6.6
Turnout		1,643	45.1	
Liberal Democrats hold		Swing		

=== Haydon ===
Haydon (1 seat)
Party	Candidate	Votes	%	±%
Labour	Brian Gallacher	813	68.4	▲3.4
Conservative	Anne Waggitt	375	31.2	▲14.3
Majority		438	36.9	▼11.3
Turnout		1,201	35.3	
Labour hold		Swing		

=== Hexham Central with Acomb ===
Hexham Central with Acomb (1 seat)
Party	Candidate	Votes	%	±%
Conservative	Trevor Cessford	742	44.7	▼5.2
Labour	Penny Grennan	558	33.6	▼3.8
Liberal Democrats	Ginnie O'Farrell	240	14.5	▲7.8
Green	Keith Mallinson	119	7.2	▲2.7
Majority		184	11.1	▼9.0
Turnout		1,677	48.8	
Conservative hold		Swing		

=== Hexham East ===
Hexham East (1 seat)
Party	Candidate	Votes	%	±%
Conservative	Cath Homer	687	43.8	▼21.9
Liberal Democrats	Suzanne Fairless-Aitken	557	35.5	▲20.3
Labour	Guy Hinton	323	20.6	▲6.2
Majority		130	8.3	▼42.1
Turnout		1,583	44.5	
Conservative hold		Swing		

=== Hexham West ===
Hexham West (1 seat)
Party	Candidate	Votes	%	±%
Independent	Derek Kennedy	1,297	69.3	▲12.5
Conservative	Liam Panesh	323	17.3	▼12.8
Labour	Victor Ball	169	9.0	▲0.6
Green	Cameron Whiteley	83	4.4	▼0.3
Majority		974	52.0	▲25.3
Turnout		1,881	58.4	
Independent hold		Swing		

=== Hirst ===
Hirst (1 seat)
Party	Candidate	Votes	%	±%
Labour	Ken Parry	559	71.9	▼7.8
Conservative	Kevin Wilson	131	16.8	▲5.2
Reform	John Allen	88	11.3	New
Majority		428	55.0	▼12.5
Turnout		787	24.3	
Labour hold		Swing		

=== Holywell ===
Holywell (1 seat)
Party	Candidate	Votes	%	±%
Labour	Les Bowman	984	57.0	▼7.0
Conservative	John Watson	636	36.9	▼2.4
Green	Steve Leyland	105	6.1	New
Majority		348	20.2	▼9.3
Turnout		1,734	43.8	
Labour hold		Swing		

=== Humshaugh ===
Humshaugh (1 seat)
Party	Candidate	Votes	%	±%
Green	Nick Morphet	1,046	52.2	▲23.2
Conservative	Rupert Gibson	849	42.3	▼12.9
Labour	Milo Barnett	80	4.0	▼5.6
Liberal Democrats	Stuart Rowlands	30	1.5	▼4.8
Majority		197	9.8	▼16.4
Turnout		2,012	59.4	
Green gain from Conservative		Swing		

=== Isabella ===
Isabella (1 seat)
Party	Candidate	Votes	%	±%
Labour	Anna Watson	482	58.6	▼5.3
Conservative	Alice Levy	340	41.4	▲26.5
Majority		142	17.3	▼30.5
Turnout		831	27.0	
Labour hold		Swing		

=== Kitty Brewster ===
Kitty Brewster (1 seat)
Party	Candidate	Votes	%	±%
Conservative	Wojciech Ploszaj	698	51.1	▲21.2
Labour	Warren Taylor	591	43.3	▼1.8
Liberal Democrats	Sandra Stanger	77	5.6	▼1.7
Majority		107	7.8	▼7.4
Turnout		1,374	27.7	
Conservative gain from Labour		Swing		

=== Longhorsley ===
Longhorsley (1 seat)
Party	Candidate	Votes	%	±%
Conservative	Hugh Sanderson	1,240	74.0	▼10.4
Labour	Ian Lindley	311	18.6	▲10.2
Liberal Democrats	Andrew Findlay	124	7.4	▲0.1
Majority		929	55.5	▼20.5
Turnout		1,684	45.0	
Conservative hold		Swing		

=== Longhoughton ===
Longhoughton (1 seat)
Party	Candidate	Votes	%	±%
Conservative	Wendy Pattison	1,011	59.9	▲7.0
Liberal Democrats	Lydia Cairns	528	31.3	▼9.4
Labour	Trevor Robertson	148	8.8	▲2.3
Majority		483	28.6	▲16.4
Turnout		1,695	47.5	
Conservative hold		Swing		

=== Lynemouth ===
Lynemouth (1 seat)
Party	Candidate	Votes	%	±%
Labour	Liz Dunn	739	57.3	▲10.9
Conservative	Ciera Hudspith	488	37.8	▲22.0
Liberal Democrats	Roger Cashmore	63	4.9	▲0.3
Majority		251	19.5	▲6.4
Turnout		1,296	37.7	
Labour hold		Swing		

=== Morpeth Kirkhill ===
Morpeth Kirkhill (1 seat)
Party	Candidate	Votes	%	±%
Conservative	Richard Wearmouth	1,118	56.7	▲1.5
Labour	Tom Cosh	387	19.6	▲9.1
Liberal Democrats	Andy Cochrane	253	12.8	▼21.6
Green	Elisa Lawson	216	10.8	New
Majority		731	37.0	▲16.2
Turnout		1,986	45.3	
Conservative hold		Swing		

=== Morpeth North ===
Morpeth North (1 seat)
Party	Candidate	Votes	%	±%
Conservative	David Bawn	1,160	53.9	▲4.5
Labour	Mike Greveson	643	29.9	▲19.6
Green	Elaine Skinner	351	16.3	▲1.5
Majority		517	24.0	▲0.2
Turnout		2,172	54.0	
Conservative hold		Swing		

=== Morpeth Stobhill ===
Morpeth Stobhill (1 seat)
Party	Candidate	Votes	%	±%
Conservative	John Beynon	835	47.5	▼2.1
Liberal Democrats	Alison Byard	478	27.2	▲3.9
Labour	Margaret Turner	337	19.2	▲6.7
Green	Pat Fuller	107	6.1	New
Majority		357	20.3	▼6.0
Turnout		1,771	49.3	
Conservative hold		Swing		

=== Newbiggin Central & East ===
Newbiggin Central & East (1 seat)
Party	Candidate	Votes	%	±%
Labour	Liz Simpson	674	55.5	▼15.4
Conservative	Sam Bell	363	29.9	▲0.8
Reform	Stephen Peel	178	14.7	New
Majority		311	25.6	▼16.3
Turnout		1,229	34.6	
Labour hold		Swing		

=== Newsham ===
Newsham (1 seat)
Party	Candidate	Votes	%	±%
Conservative	Cliff Humphrey	531	45.9	▲25.2
Labour	Deirdre Campbell	520	44.9	▼5.8
Green	Kathleen Leyland	55	4.7	New
Independent	Paul Walls	52	4.5	New
Majority		11	1.0	▼11.7
Turnout		1,169	31.3	
Conservative gain from Labour		Swing		

=== Norham & Islandshires ===
Norham & Islandshires (1 seat)
Party	Candidate	Votes	%	±%
Conservative	Colin Hardy	616	37.9	▼12.3
Liberal Democrats	Dougie Watkin	529	32.5	▼9.7
Independent	Ged Thomas	312	19.2	New
Labour	Michael Coombes	170	10.4	▲2.8
Majority		87	5.3	▼2.7
Turnout		1,637	45.4	
Conservative hold		Swing		

=== Pegswood ===
Pegswood (1 seat)
Party	Candidate	Votes	%	±%
Conservative	David Towns	1,021	54.2	▲16.4
Labour	Vicky Oakley	784	41.6	▲7.5
No description	Robert Bell	79	4.2	New
Majority		237	8.9	▲8.9
Turnout		1,896	42.6	
Conservative hold		Swing		

=== Plessey ===
Plessey (1 seat)
Party	Candidate	Votes	%	±%
Liberal Democrats	Jeff Reid	450	37.6	▼8.3
Conservative	Jon Davison	385	32.2	▲19.2
Labour	John Regan	311	26.0	▼2.8
Reform	Rev Cornell	51	4.3	New
Majority		65	5.4	▼11.6
Turnout		1,208	37.0	
Liberal Democrats hold		Swing		

=== Ponteland East & Stannington ===
Ponteland East & Stannington (1 seat)
Party	Candidate	Votes	%	±%
Conservative	Lyle Darwin	1,116	69.9	▼7.9
Liberal Democrats	David Armstrong	245	15.3	▲7.8
Labour	Robert Turner	236	14.8	▲6.1
Majority		871	54.5	▼14.6
Turnout		1,605	41.3	
Conservative hold		Swing		

=== Ponteland North ===
Ponteland North (1 seat)
Party	Candidate	Votes	%	±%
Conservative	Richard Dodd	1,152	73.9	▼13.8
Labour	Simon Railton	232	14.9	▲6.2
Liberal Democrats	Mark Neale	174	11.2	▲7.6
Majority		920	59.1	▼20.1
Turnout		1,574	39.5	
Conservative hold		Swing		

=== Ponteland South with Heddon ===
Ponteland South with Heddon (1 seat)
Party	Candidate	Votes	%	±%
Conservative	Peter Jackson	985	67.8	▼10.2
Labour	Mike Brown	320	22.0	▼10.2
Liberal Democrats	Benjamin Mitchell	147	10.1	▲1.1
Majority		665	45.8	▼19.2
Turnout		1,460	43.5	
Conservative hold		Swing		

=== Ponteland West ===
Ponteland West (1 seat)
Party	Candidate	Votes	%	±%
Conservative	Veronica Jones	997	73.9	▼11.7
Labour	Michael Clarke	250	18.5	▲4.1
Liberal Democrats	James Greer	102	7.6	New
Majority		747	55.4	▼15.9
Turnout		1,363	38.2	
Conservative hold		Swing		

=== Prudhoe North ===
Prudhoe North (1 seat)
Party	Candidate	Votes	%	±%
Labour	Angie Scott	862	50.0	▲10.7
Conservative	Tracy Gilmore	795	46.1	▲1.8
Liberal Democrats	Janice Walmsley	67	3.9	▼2.4
Majority		67	3.9	▼1.1
Turnout		1,729	41.7	
Labour gain from Conservative		Swing		

=== Prudhoe South ===
Prudhoe South (1 seat)
Party	Candidate	Votes	%	±%
Conservative	Gordon Stewart	907	59.7	▲20.7
Labour	Jonathan Wheeler	553	36.4	▲18.8
Liberal Democrats	Abby French	60	3.9	▲1.5
Majority		354	23.3	▲21.6
Turnout		1,530	37.5	
Conservative hold		Swing		

=== Rothbury ===
Rothbury (1 seat)
Party	Candidate	Votes	%	±%
Independent	Steven Bridgett	1,987	79.7	▲14.2
Conservative	Chris Galley	202	8.1	▼15.7
Labour Co-op	Ray Aplin	189	7.9	▲4.3
Green	Jennifer Wallace	115	4.6	▼2.5
Majority		1,785	71.6	▲29.9
Turnout		2,498	60.1	
Independent hold		Swing		

=== Seaton with Newbiggin West ===
Seaton with Newbiggin West (1 seat)
Party	Candidate	Votes	%	±%
Labour	James Lang	888	65.6	▼7.1
Conservative	Philip Grieveson	465	34.4	▲7.1
Majority		423	31.3	▼14.1
Turnout		1,360	32.6	
Labour hold		Swing		

=== Seghill with Seaton Delaval ===
Seghill with Seaton Delaval (1 seat)
Party	Candidate	Votes	%	±%
Conservative	Paul Scott	884	54.5	▲12.2
Labour	Christine Savage	739	45.5	▼3.9
Majority		145	8.9	▲1.8
Turnout		1,634	35.2	
Conservative gain from Labour		Swing		

=== Shilbottle ===
Shilbottle (1 seat)
Party	Candidate	Votes	%	±%
Conservative	Trevor Thorne	1,060	54.3	▼10.9
Labour	Ian Chapman	402	20.6	▲6.2
Liberal Democrats	Alex Brewis	297	15.2	▼1.1
Green	Philip Hood	192	9.8	New
Majority		658	33.7	▼15.2
Turnout		1,963	44.0	
Conservative hold		Swing		

=== Sleekburn ===
Sleekburn (1 seat)
Party	Candidate	Votes	%	±%
Labour	Alex Wallace	426	45.1	▲8.4
Conservative	Alan Stovell	259	27.4	▲2.2
Independent	Dawn Crosby	191	20.2	New
Independent	David Graham	69	7.3	New
Majority		167	17.7	▲6.2
Turnout		963	28.6	
Labour hold		Swing		

=== South Blyth ===
South Blyth (1 seat)
Party	Candidate	Votes	%	±%
Conservative	Daniel Carr	1,114	73.0	▲44.1
Labour	Rachel Edge	270	17.7	▼7.0
Liberal Democrats	Alisdair Gibbs-Barton	114	7.5	▼21.4
SDP	Liam Rogerson	29	1.9	New
Majority		844	55.3	▲55.2
Turnout		1,540	41.5	
Conservative gain from Liberal Democrats		Swing		

=== South Tynedale ===
South Tynedale (1 seat)
Party	Candidate	Votes	%	±%
Conservative	Colin Horncastle	995	57.3	▼14.3
Labour	Kathy Habberjam	408	23.5	▲13.7
Green	Richard Sutton	225	13.0	▲4.9
Liberal Democrats	Dawn Bailey	107	6.2	▼4.3
Majority		587	33.8	▼27.3
Turnout		1,749	44.2	
Conservative hold		Swing		

=== Stakeford ===
Stakeford (1 seat)
Party	Candidate	Votes	%	±%
Labour	Julie Foster	744	54.1	▼10.3
Conservative	Noel Jackson	630	45.9	▲10.3
Majority		114	8.3	▼20.5
Turnout		1,383	39.8	
Labour hold		Swing		

=== Stocksfield & Broomhaugh ===
Stocksfield & Broomhaugh (1 seat)
Party	Candidate	Votes	%	±%
Independent	Patricia Anne Dale	1,607	75.4	▲12.3
Conservative	Chris Barrett	296	13.9	▼1.5
Labour	Claire Byrne	159	7.5	▲1.2
Green	Ian Richardson	69	3.2	New
Majority		1,311	61.5	▲23.8
Turnout		2,138	55.4	
Independent hold		Swing		

=== Wensleydale ===
Wensleydale (1 seat)
Party	Candidate	Votes	%	±%
Labour	Eileen Cartie	716	54.7	▲0.1
Conservative	Sam Liddle	547	41.8	▲25.0
Liberal Democrats	David Sumner	47	3.6	▼13.7
Majority		169	12.9	▼24.4
Turnout		1,319	33.6	
Labour hold		Swing		

=== Wooler ===
Wooler (1 seat)
Party	Candidate	Votes	%	±%
Conservative	Mark Mather	1,231	76.8	▲3.9
Labour	Pauline Thompson	130	8.1	▲0.9
Liberal Democrats	Tom Hancock	92	5.7	▼4.7
Green	Alex Kuklinski	88	5.5	▼4.0
SDP	Stephen Crane	61	3.8	New
Majority		1,101	68.7	▲6.1
Turnout		1,616	45.6	
Conservative hold		Swing		

== Changes 2021–2025 ==
=== By-elections ===
==== Hexham East ====
Hexham East: 16 December 2021
Party	Candidate	Votes	%	±%
Liberal Democrats	Suzanne Fairless-Aitken	584	47.3	+11.7
Conservative	Stephen Ball	370	30.0	−13.9
Labour	Jonathan Wheeler	154	12.5	−8.1
Independent	Lee Williscroft-Ferris	127	10.3	N/A
Majority		214	17.3	
Turnout		1,237	34.5	
Liberal Democrats gain from Conservative		Swing	▲12.8	

The by-election was triggered by the resignation of Conservative councillor Cath Homer in November 2021, which she attributed to a "malicious" campaign of abuse against her.

==== Seghill with Seaton Delaval ====
Seghill with Seaton Delaval: 24 March 2022
Party	Candidate	Votes	%	±%
Conservative	Eve Chicken	702	55.6	N/A
Labour	Christine Savage	511	40.5	N/A
Green	Clive Robson	29	2.3	N/A
Liberal Democrats	Alisdair Gibbs-Barton	21	1.7	N/A
Majority		191	15.1	
Turnout		1,265	27	
Conservative hold		Swing		

The by-election was triggered by the death of Conservative councillor Paul Scott in January 2022.

==== Cramlington Eastfield ====
Cramlington Eastfield: 22 August 2024
Party	Candidate	Votes	%	±%
Conservative	Alan Smith	513	43.5	N/A
Labour	James Gillooly	371	31.5	N/A
Reform	Mark Owen	177	15.0	N/A
Independent	Libby Cripps	67	5.7	N/A
Liberal Democrats	Andy McGregor	23	2.0	N/A
Green	Paul Evans	22	1.9	N/A
Independent	Dawn Furness	6	0.5	N/A
Majority		142	12.0	
Turnout		1,182	31	
Conservative hold		Swing		

The by-election was triggered by the resignation of Conservative councillor Christine Dunbar, who cited personal reasons and explicitly denied any political motive.
