= Newcastle upon Tyne =

City in Tyne & Wear, England

- City and metropolitan borough
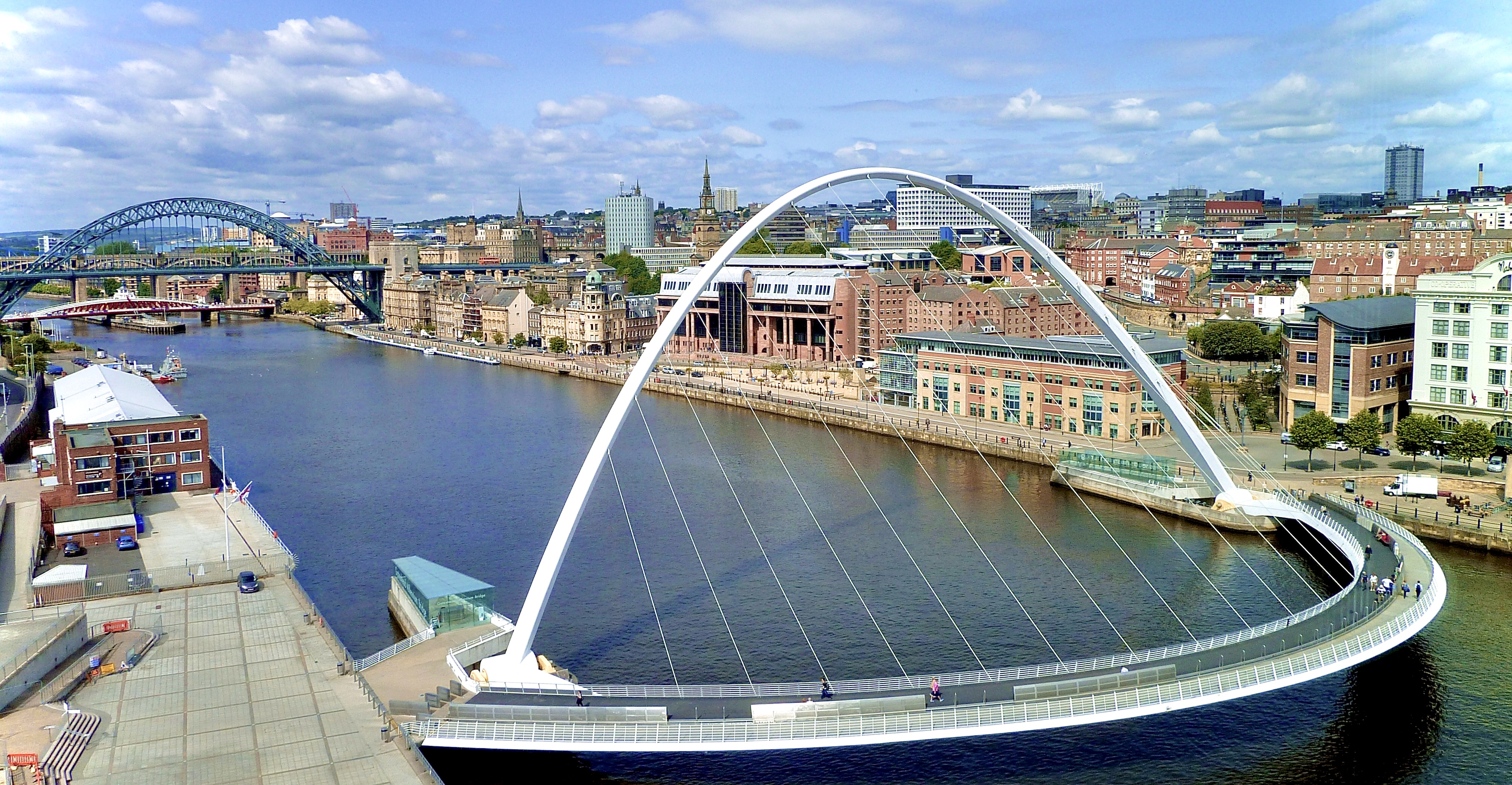
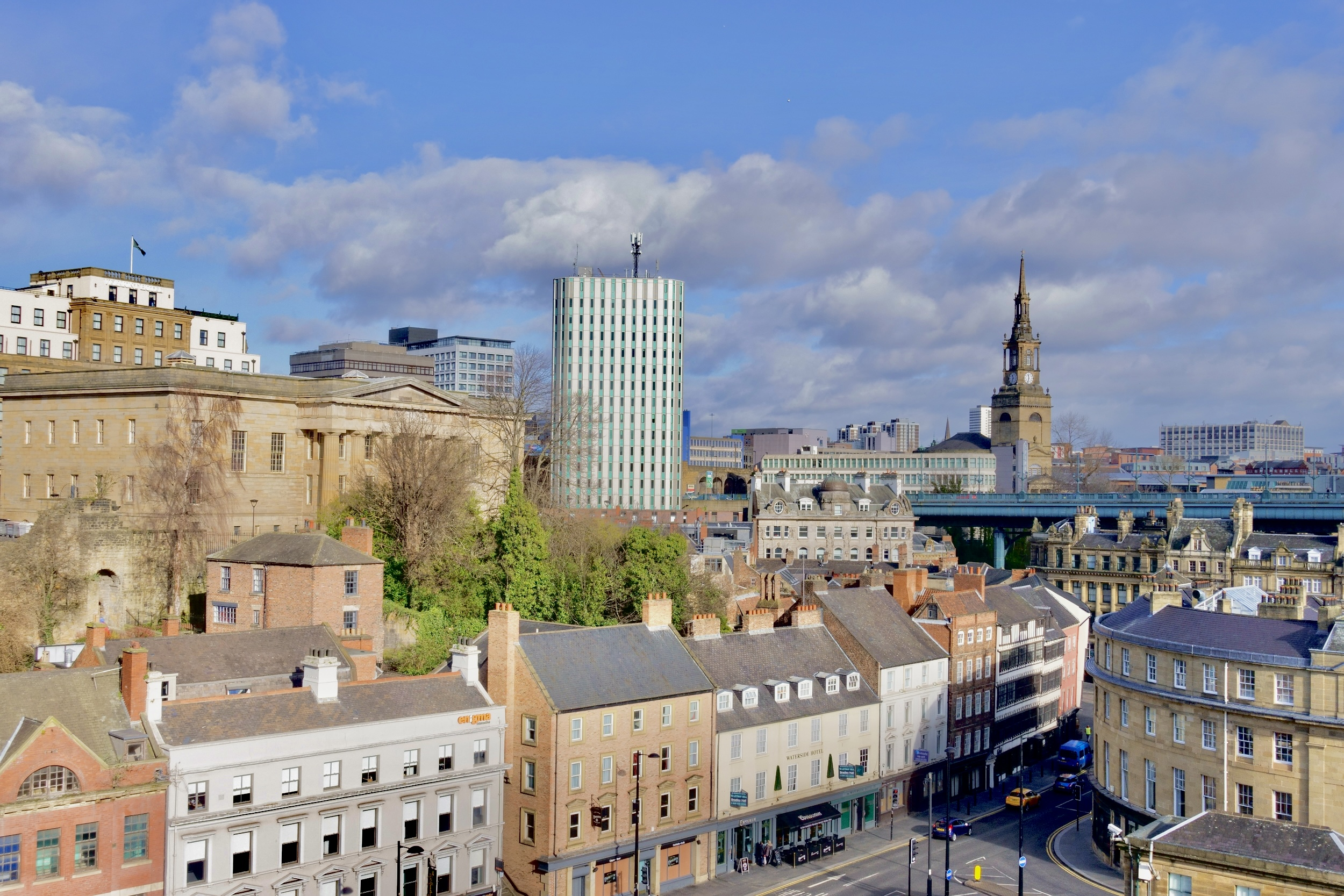
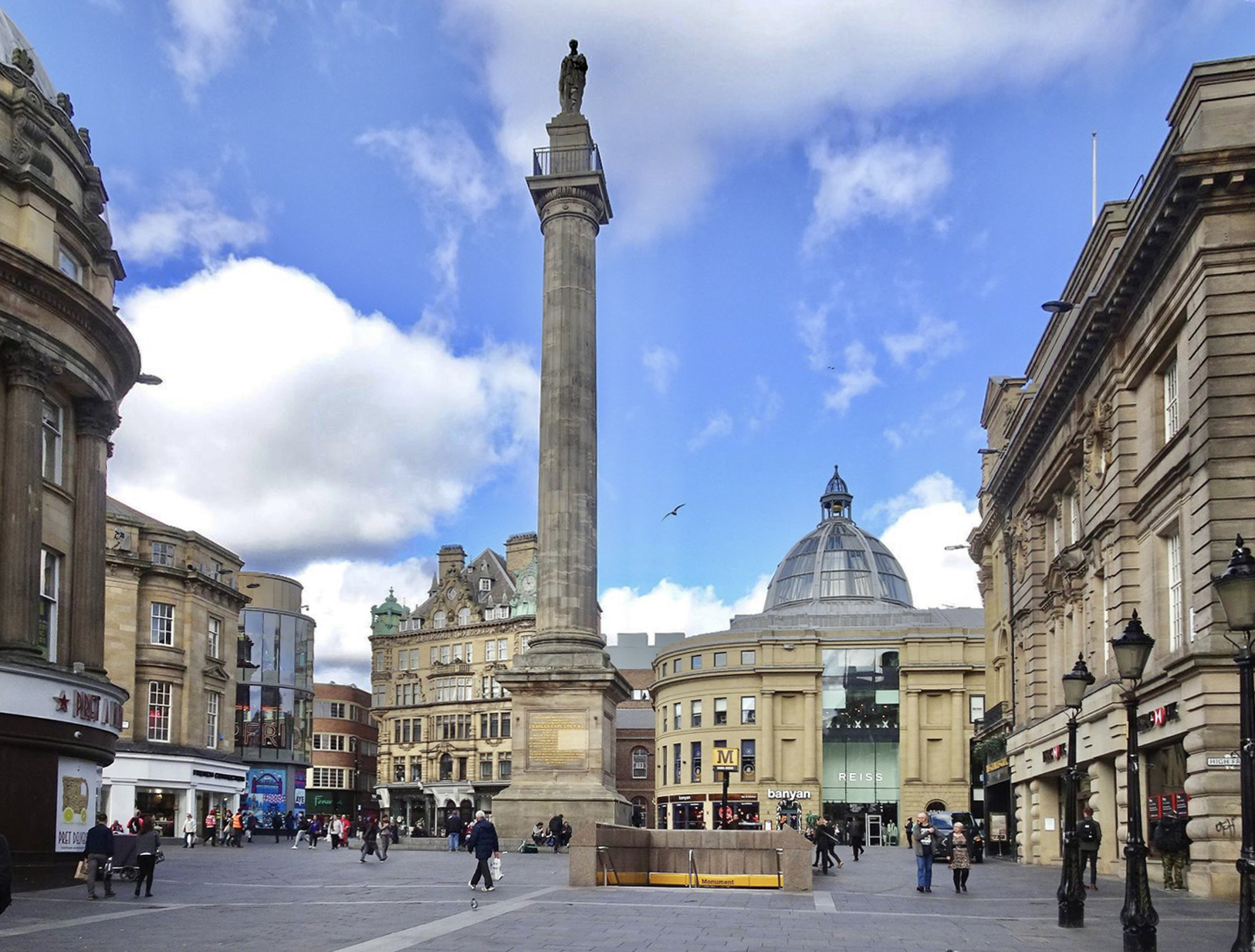
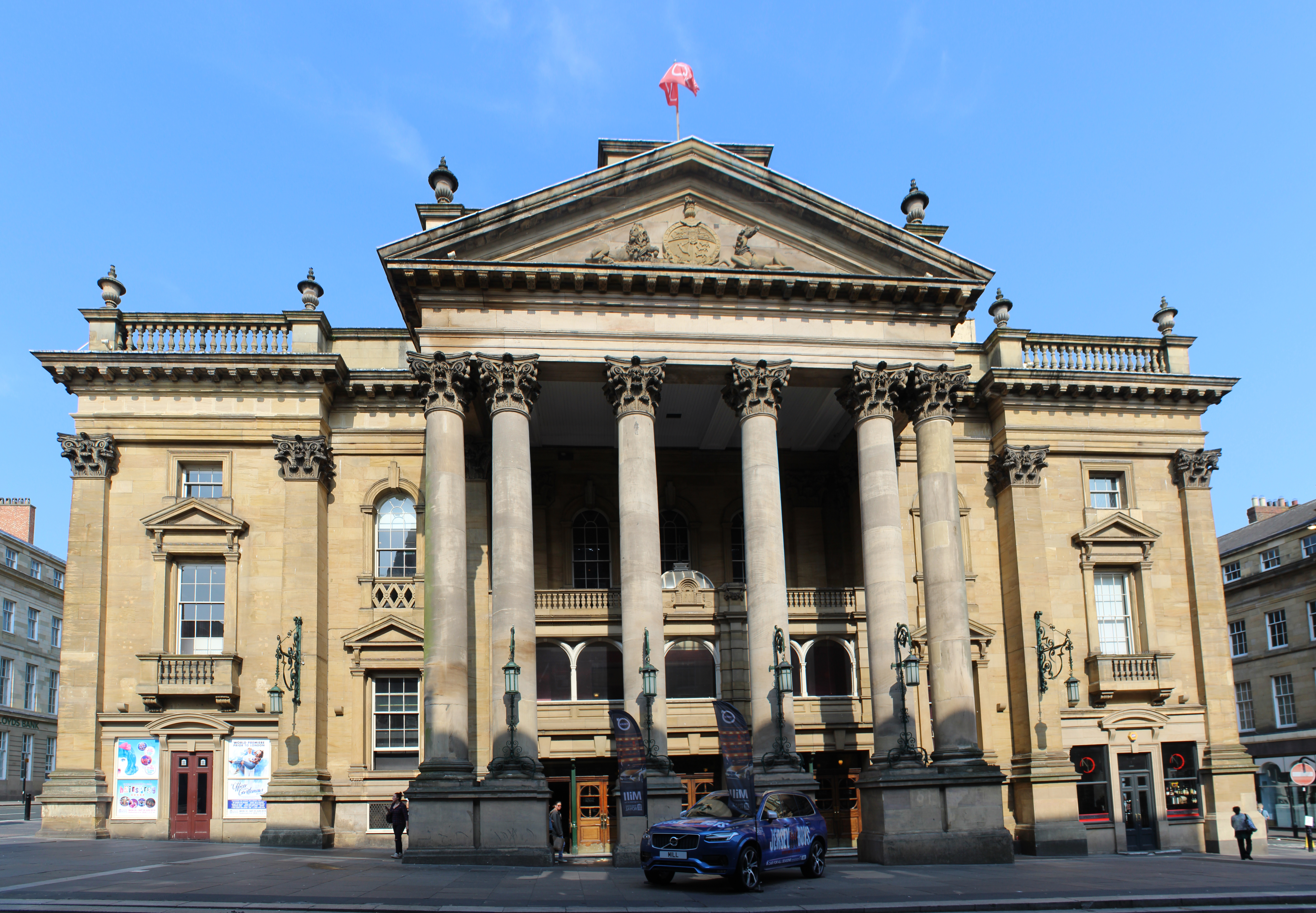
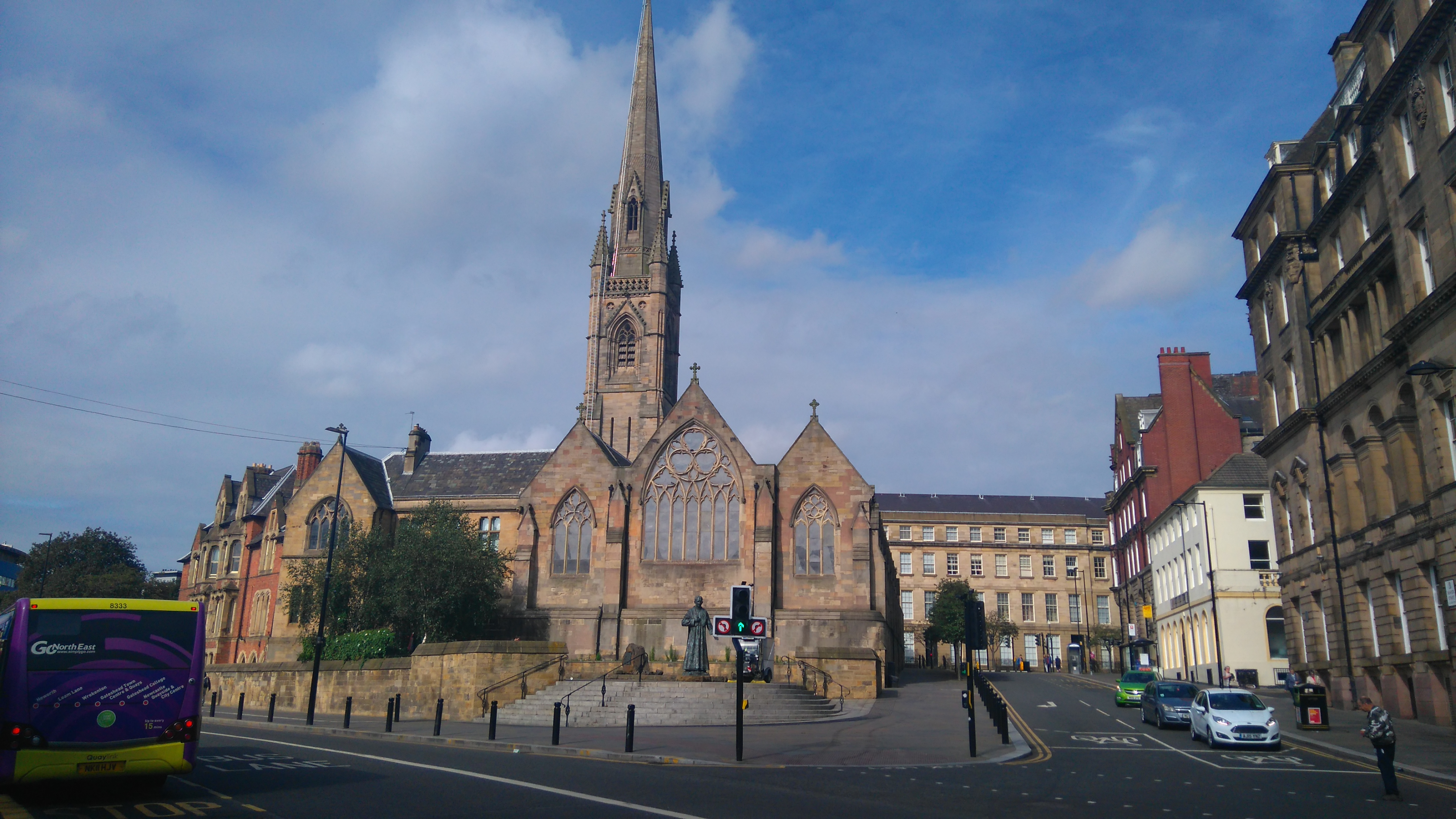
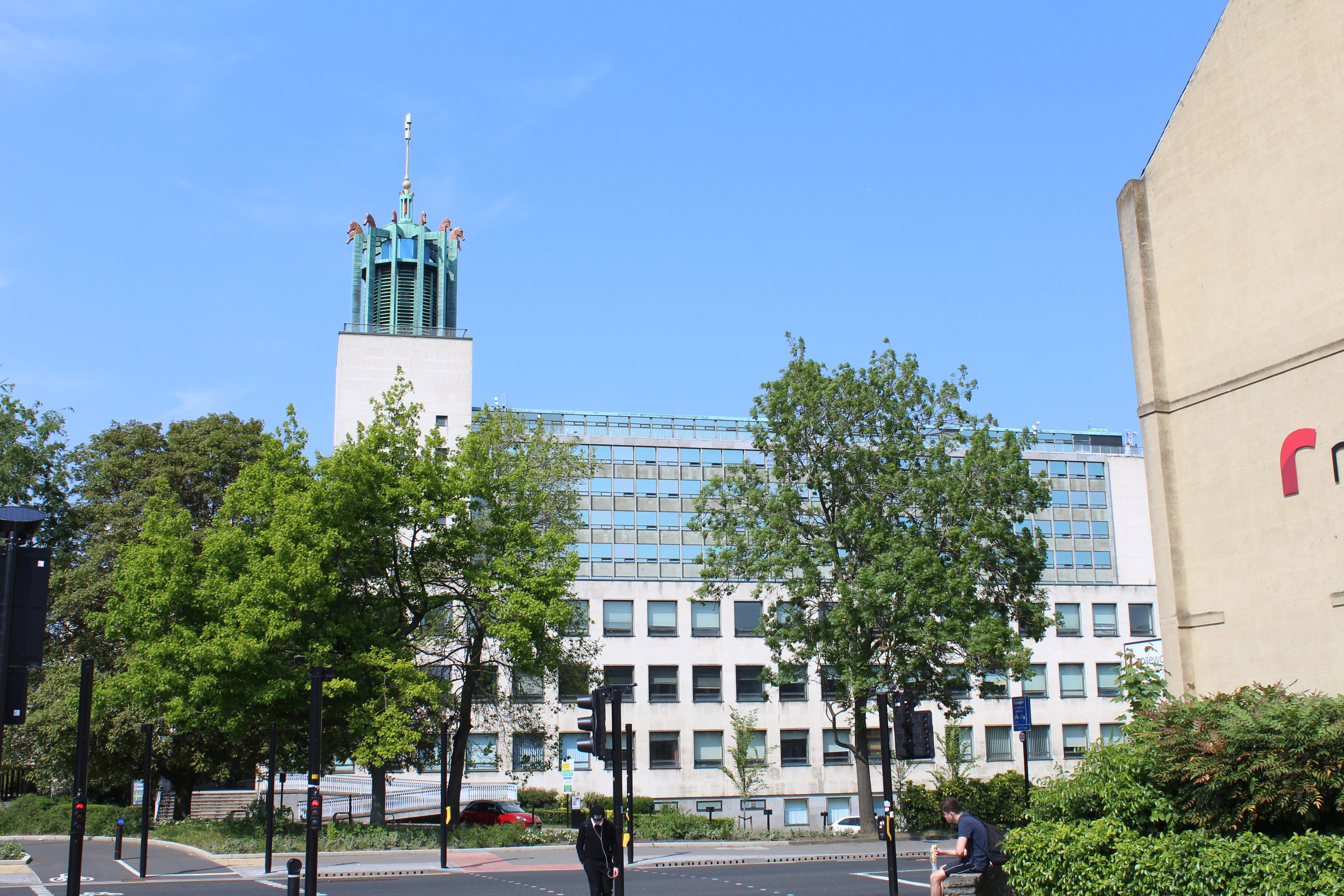
- The Quayside, with the Tyne Bridge to the left and the Millennium Bridge to the centre right Buildings on Sandhill The Castle Grainger Town Theatre Royal St Mary's RC Cathedral Civic Centre

- Coat of arms
- Nickname: The Toon
- Motto: Latin: Fortiter Defendit Triumphans, lit. 'Triumphing by Brave Defence'
- Newcastle shown within Tyne and Wear
- Interactive map of Newcastle upon Tyne
- Coordinates: 54°58′26″N 1°36′48″W
- Sovereign state: United Kingdom
- Country: England
- Region: North East
- Ceremonial county: Tyne and Wear
- Historic county: Northumberland
- City region: North East
- Founded: Second century
- City status: 1882
- Metropolitan borough: 1 April 1974
- Administrative HQ: Newcastle Civic Centre

Government
  - Type: Metropolitan borough
  - Body: Newcastle City Council
  - Executive: Leader and cabinet
  - Control: No overall control
  - Leader: Colin Ferguson (LD)
  - Lord Mayor: Henry Gallagher
  - MPs: 5 MPs: Emma Foody (L); Mary Glindon (L); Catherine McKinnell (L); Joe Morris (L); Chi Onwurah (L)

Area
  - Total: 115 km^{2} (44 sq mi)
  - Land: 113 km^{2} (44 sq mi)
  - Rank: 182nd

Population (2025)
  - Total: 320,838
  - Rank: 45th
  - Density: 2,828/km^{2} (7,320/sq mi)
- Demonyms: Novocastrian; Geordie (colloq.)

Ethnicity (2021)
  - Ethnic groups: List: 80.0% White; 11.4% Asian; 3.3% Black; 2.3% Mixed; 3.1% other

Religion (2021)
  - Religion: List: 41.3% Christianity; 40.8% no religion; 9.0% Islam; 1.4% Hinduism; 0.5% Sikhism; 0.5% Buddhism; 0.2% Judaism; 0.4% other; 6.0% not stated
- Time zone: UTC+0 (GMT)
  - Summer (DST): UTC+1 (BST)
- Postcode area: NE1–7; NE12–20
- Dialling code: 0191
- ISO 3166 code: GB-NET
- GSS code: E08000021
- Website: newcastle.gov.uk

Newcastle upon Tyne, or simply Newcastle (/njuːˈkæsəl/ new-KASS-əl, RP: /ˈnjuːkɑːsəl/ NEW-kah-səl), is a city and metropolitan borough, in Tyne and Wear, England. While the hyphenated form of the name, Newcastle-upon-Tyne, is seen sometimes, correct usage is generally unhyphenated.

It is England's northernmost city, sited on the river Tyne's northern bank opposite Gateshead to the south. It is the most populous settlement in the Tyneside conurbation and North East England. The metropolitan borough had an estimated population of 320,838 in 2025.

Newcastle developed around a Roman settlement called Pons Aelius. The settlement became known as Monkchester before taking on the name of a castle built in 1080 by William the Conqueror's eldest son, Robert Curthose. It was one of the world's largest ship building and repair centres during the Industrial Revolution. The city was historically part of the county of Northumberland, but governed as a county corporate after 1400. In 1974, Newcastle became part of the newly created metropolitan county of Tyne and Wear. The local authority is Newcastle City Council, which is a constituent member of the North East Combined Authority.

== History ==
=== Roman era ===
The first recorded settlement in what is now Newcastle was Pons Aelius ("Aelian bridge"), a Roman fort and bridge across the Tyne. It was given the family name of the Roman emperor Hadrian, who founded it in the second century AD. This rare honour suggests Hadrian may have visited the site and instituted the bridge on his tour of Britain. The population of Pons Aelius then was estimated at 2,000. Fragments of Hadrian's Wall are visible in parts of Newcastle, particularly along the West Road. The course of the Roman wall can be traced eastwards to Segedunum, a Roman fort in Wallsend (Note: The "wall's end".) and to the separate supply fort of Arbeia in South Shields, across the river from Hadrian's Wall.

The extent of Hadrian's Wall was 73 miles (117 km), spanning the width of Britain; it incorporated the Vallum, a large rearward ditch with parallel mounds, and was built primarily for defence and to prevent the incursion of Pictish tribes from the north. It was probably not as a fighting line for a major invasion; however, it seems that the Vallum stopped just west of Newcastle, where its role as a secondary line of defence was performed by the Tyne.

=== Anglo-Saxon and Norman eras ===
Castle Keep is the oldest structure in the city, dating back to the 1170s.

After the Roman departure from Britain, completed in 410, Newcastle became part of the powerful Anglo-Saxon kingdom of Northumbria and was known throughout this period as Munucceaster (sometimes modernised as Monkchester).

Conflicts with the Danes in 876 left the settlements along the river Tyne in ruins. After battles with the Danes and following the 1088 rebellion against the Normans, Monkchester was all but destroyed by Odo of Bayeux.

Due to its strategic position, Robert Curthose, son of William the Conqueror, erected a wooden castle there in the year 1080. The town was henceforth known as Novum Castellum or New Castle. The wooden structure was replaced by a stone castle in 1087. The castle was rebuilt again in 1172, during the reign of Henry II; much of the keep which can be seen in the city today dates from this period.

=== Middle Ages ===
Throughout the Middle Ages, Newcastle was England's northern fortress. In 1400, Newcastle was separated from Northumberland for administrative purposes and was made a county of itself by Henry IV. Newcastle was given the title of the county of the town of Newcastle upon Tyne. The town had a new charter granted by Elizabeth I in 1589. A 25-foot-high (7.6 m) stone wall was built around the town in the 13th century, to defend it from invaders during the Border war against Scotland. The Scots king William the Lion was imprisoned in Newcastle in 1174, and Edward I brought the Stone of Scone and William Wallace south through the town. Newcastle was successfully defended against the Scots three times during the 14th century.

=== 16th to 19th centuries ===
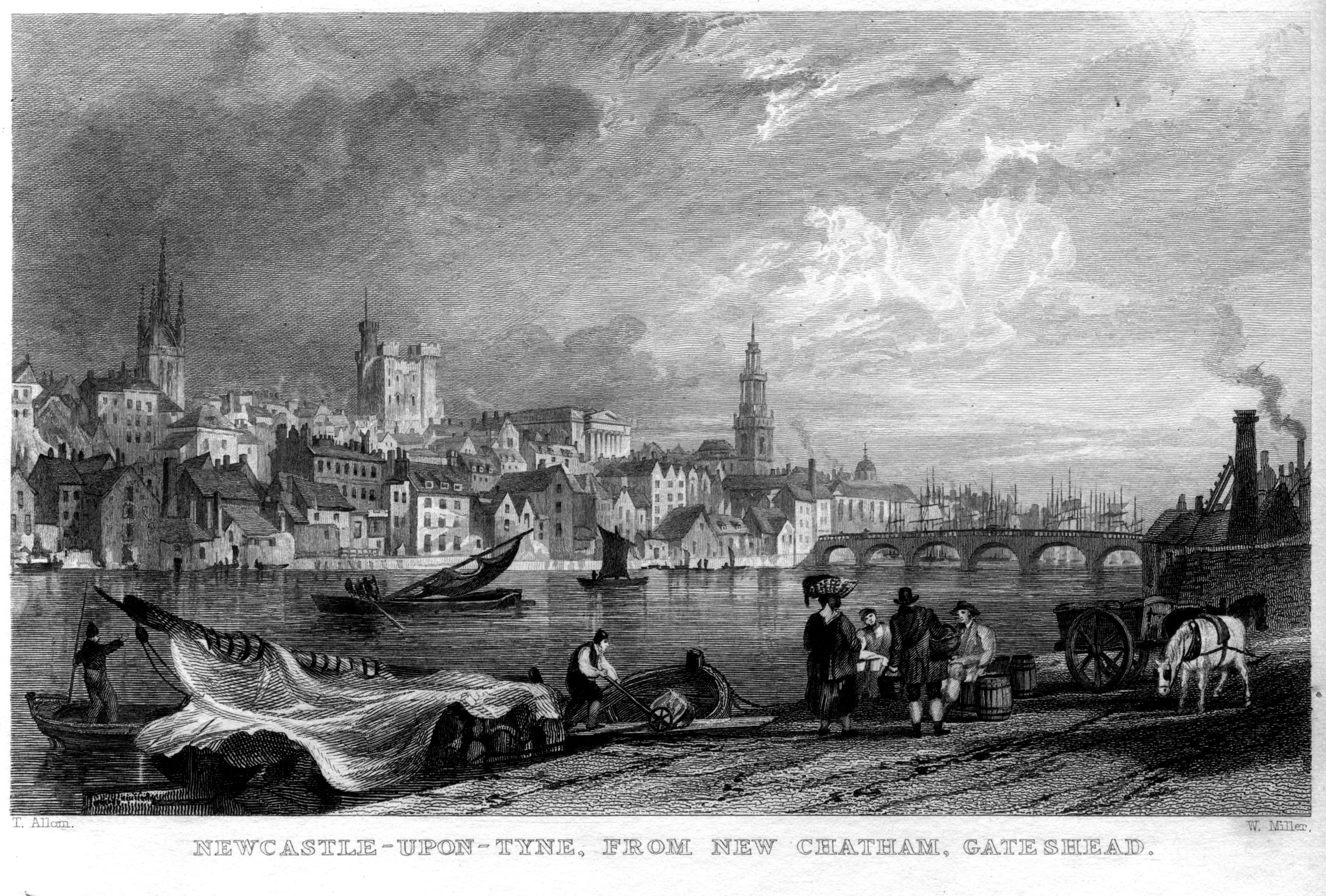
An engraving by William Miller of Newcastle in 1832, as seen from Gateshead

From 1530, a royal act restricted all shipments of coal from Tyneside to Newcastle Quayside, giving a monopoly in the coal trade to a cartel of Newcastle burgesses known as the Hostmen. This monopoly, which lasted for a considerable time, helped Newcastle prosper and develop into a major town. The phrase taking coals to Newcastle was first recorded contextually in 1538. The phrase itself means a pointless pursuit. In the 18th century, the American entrepreneur Timothy Dexter, regarded as an eccentric, defied this idiom. He was persuaded to sail a shipment of coal to Newcastle by merchants plotting to ruin him; however, his shipment arrived on the Tyne during a strike that had crippled local production, allowing him to turn a considerable profit.

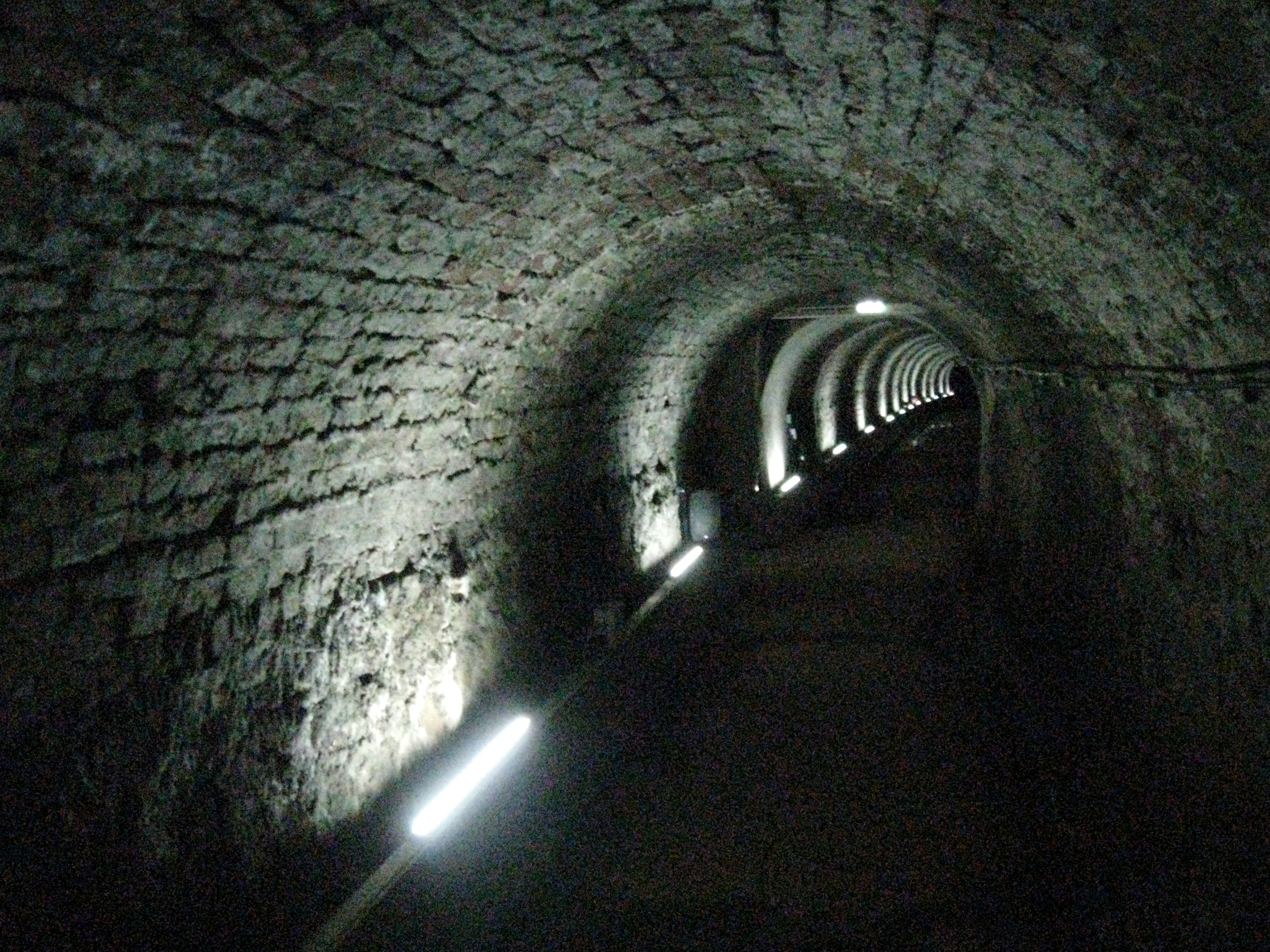
Victoria Tunnel, built to transport coal

In the Sandgate area, to the east of the city and beside the river, resided the close-knit community of keelmen and their families. They were so called because they worked on the keels, boats that were used to transfer coal from the river banks to the waiting colliers, for export to London and elsewhere. In the 1630s, about 7,000 out of 20,000 inhabitants of Newcastle died of plague, more than one-third of the population. Specifically within the year 1636, it is roughly estimated with evidence held by the Society of Antiquaries that 47% of the then population of Newcastle died from the epidemic; this may also have been the most devastating loss in any British city in this period.

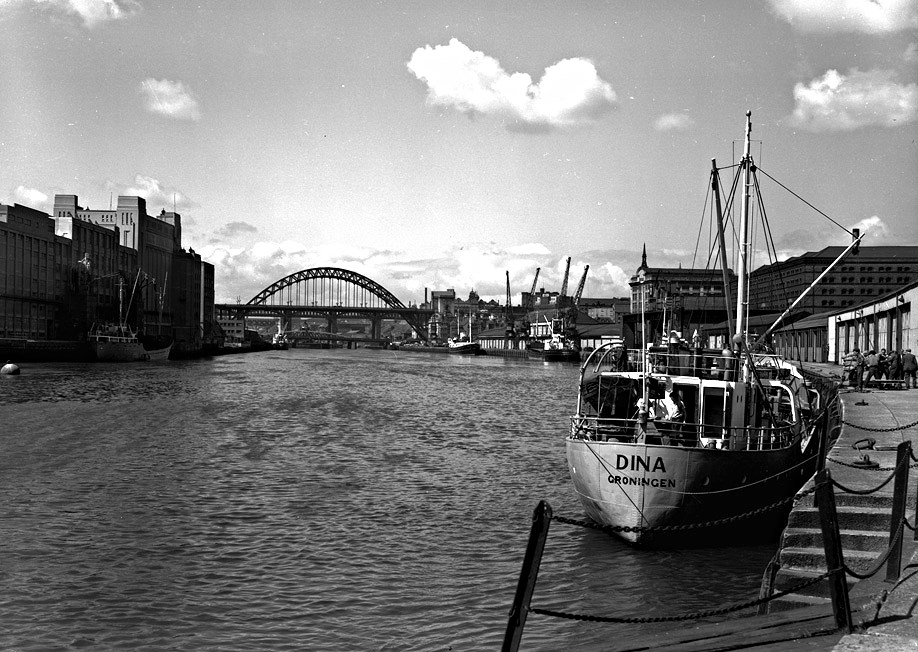
Newcastle was once a major industrial centre, particularly for coal and shipping.

During the English Civil War, the North declared for the King. In a bid to gain Newcastle and the Tyne, Cromwell's allies, the Scots, captured the town of Newburn. In 1644, the Scots then captured the reinforced fortification on the Lawe in South Shields following a siege and the city was besieged for many months. It was eventually stormed ("with roaring drummes") and sacked by Cromwell's allies. The grateful King bestowed the motto Fortiter Defendit Triumphans (Latin for 'Triumphing by a brave defence') upon the town. Charles I was imprisoned in Newcastle by the Scots in 1646–47.

After the Union in 1707, the City walls became obsolete and gave way to an expansion of the city. Despite the Jacobite risings of 1715 and 1745, fortifications gave way to industrial development.

The extraction and processing of coal and iron created a series of specialised industries, such as steel manufacture and eventually steam power.

Newcastle also became a glass producer with a reputation for brilliant flint glass. Glass was key in the industrial development of the Tyne and Wear region.

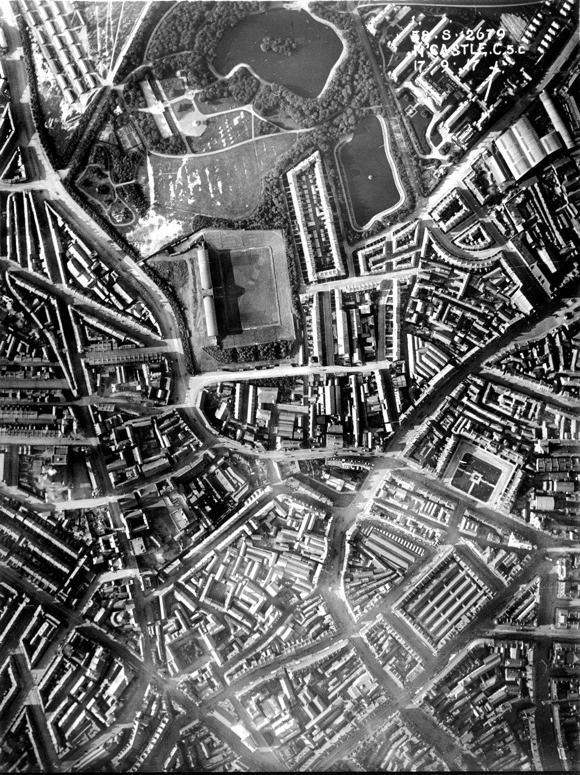
Newcastle city centre, 1917, with St James' Park football ground above and left of centre

Newcastle opened its first lunatic asylum in 1767. The asylum catered for people from the counties of Newcastle, Durham and Northumberland.

The Newcastle Eccentrics of the 19th century were a group of unrelated people who lived in and around the centre of Newcastle and its Quayside between the end of the 18th and early/mid 19th century. They are depicted in a painting by Henry Perlee Parker.

Newcastle was the country's fourth largest print centre after London, Oxford and Cambridge, and the Literary and Philosophical Society of 1793, with its erudite debates and large stock of books in several languages, predated the London Library by half a century. Some founder members of the Literary and Philosophical Society were abolitionists.

A permanent military presence was established in the city with the completion of Fenham Barracks in 1806.

The great fire of Newcastle and Gateshead was a tragic and spectacular series of events starting on Friday 6 October 1854, in which a substantial amount of property in the two North East of England towns was destroyed in a series of fires and an explosion which killed 53 and injured hundreds.

The status of city was granted to Newcastle on 3 June 1882. In the 19th century, shipbuilding and heavy engineering were central to the city's prosperity; and the city was a powerhouse of the Industrial Revolution. This revolution resulted in the urbanisation of the city.

In 1817, the Maling company, at one time the largest pottery company in the world, moved to the city. The Victorian industrial revolution brought industrial structures that included the 2 1/2-mile (4 km) Victoria Tunnel, built in 1842, which provided underground wagon ways to the staithes. On 3 February 1879, Mosley Street in the city, was the first public road in the world to be lit up by the incandescent lightbulb. Newcastle was one of the first cities in the world to be lit up by electric lighting.

Innovations in Newcastle and surrounding areas included the development of safety lamps, Stephenson's Rocket, Lord Armstrong's artillery, Be-Ro flour, Lucozade, Joseph Swan's electric light bulbs and Charles Parsons' invention of the steam turbine, which led to the revolution of marine propulsion and the production of cheap electricity. In 1882, Newcastle became the seat of an Anglican diocese, with St. Nicholas' Church becoming its cathedral.

=== 20th and 21st centuries ===
The city's public transport system was modernised in 1901 when Newcastle Corporation Tramways electric trams were introduced to the city's streets;these were replaced gradually by trolley buses from 1935, with the tram service finally coming to an end in 1950.

The city acquired its first art gallery, the Laing Art Gallery in 1904, named after its founder Alexander Laing, a Scottish wine and spirit merchant who wanted to give something back to the city in which he had made his fortune. Another art gallery, founded in 1926 by the King Edward VII School of Art, is the Hatton Gallery, which is now part of Newcastle University.

With the advent of the motor car, Newcastle's road network was improved in the early part of the 20th century, beginning with the opening of the Redheugh road bridge in 1901 and the Tyne Bridge in 1928.

Efforts to preserve the city's historic past were evident as long ago as 1934, when the Museum of Science and Industry opened, as did the John G Joicey Museum in the same year.

Council housing began to replace inner-city slums in the 1920s and the process continued into the 1970s, along with substantial private house building and acquisitions.

Unemployment hit record heights in Newcastle during the Great Depression of the 1930s. The city's last coal pit closed in 1956, though a temporary open cast mine was opened in 2013. The temporary open cast mine shifted 40,000 tonnes of coal, using modern techniques to reduce noise, on a part of the City undergoing redevelopment. The slow demise of the shipyards on the banks of the Tyne happened in the 1970s, 1980s and 1990s.

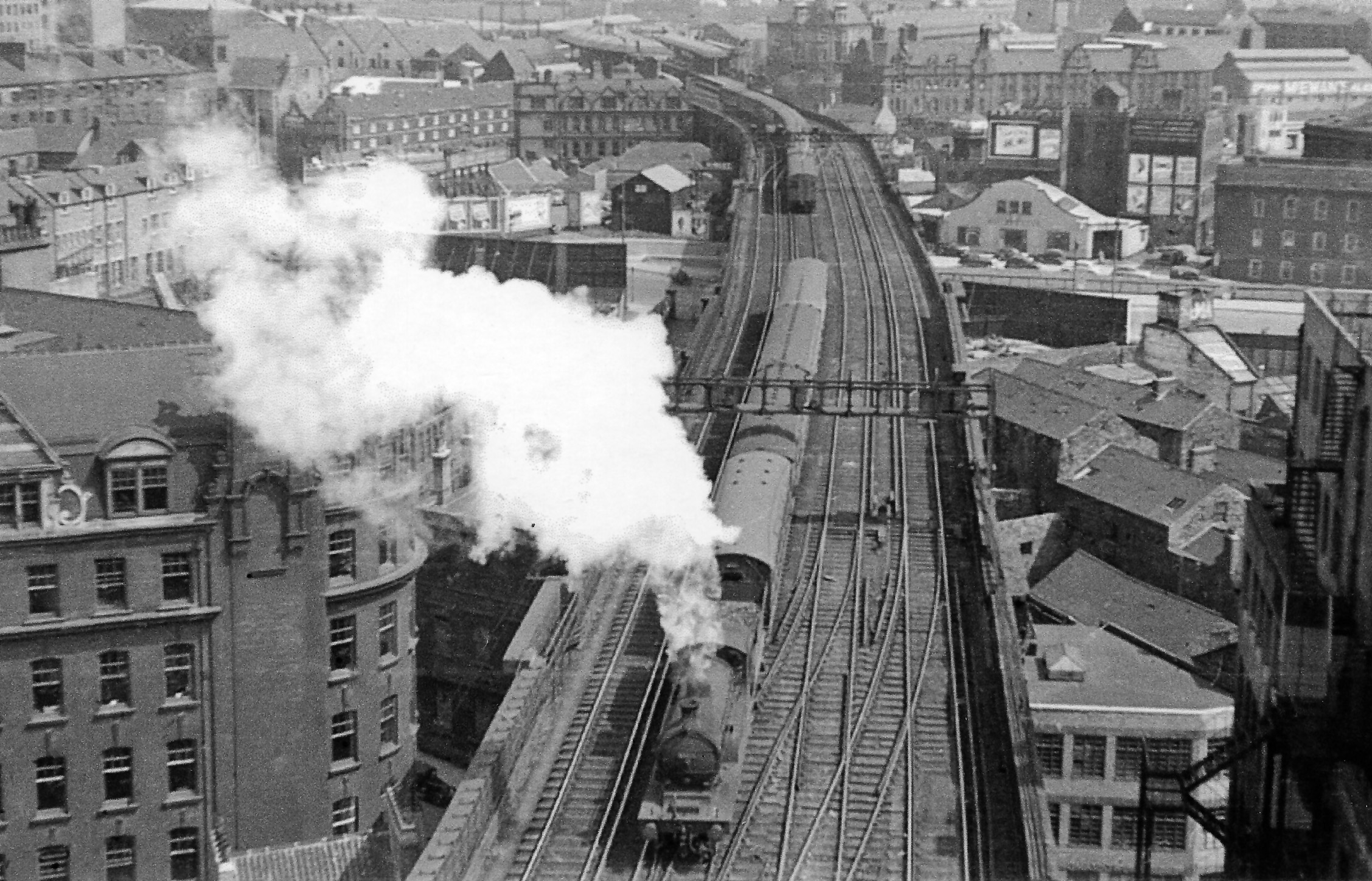
View northwards from the Castle Keep, towards Berwick-on-Tweed in 1954

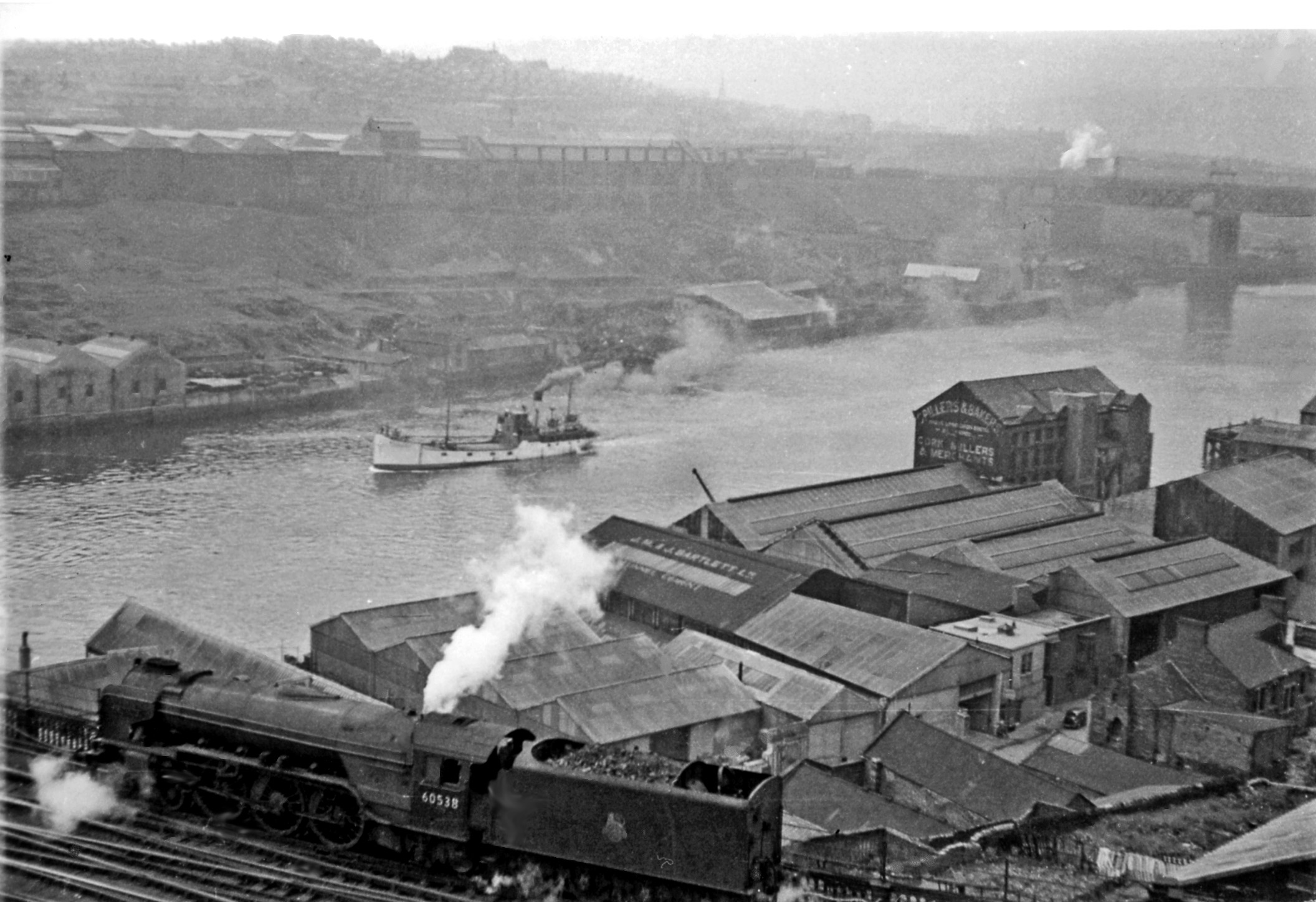
Panorama from the Castle Keep across the Tyne to Gateshead (1954)

During the Second World War, the city and surrounding area were a target for air raids as heavy industry was involved in the production of ships and armaments. The raids caused 141 deaths and 587 injuries. A former French consul in Newcastle, Jacques Serre, assisted the German war effort by describing important targets in the region to Admiral Raeder who was the head of the German Navy.

The public sector in Newcastle began to expand in the 1960s. The federal structure of the University of Durham was dissolved. That university's college in Newcastle, which had been known as King's College, became the University of Newcastle upon Tyne, (Note: Now known as Newcastle University.) which was founded in 1963, followed by Newcastle Polytechnic in 1969; the latter received university status in 1992 and became the University of Northumbria at Newcastle (Note: Now known as Northumbria University.)

Further efforts to preserve the city's historic past continued in the later 20th century, with the opening of Newcastle Military Vehicle Museum in 1983 and Stephenson Railway Museum in 1986. The Military Vehicle museum closed in 2006. New developments at the turn of the 21st century included the Life Science Centre in 2000 and Millennium Bridge in 2001.

Based at St James' Park since 1886, Newcastle United F.C. became Football League members in 1893. They have won four top division titles (the first in 1905 and the most recent in 1927), six FA Cups (the first in 1910 and the most recent in 1955), the Inter-Cities Fairs Cup in 1969 and most recently the League Cup in 2025, their first domestic trophy since 1955. They broke the world transfer record in 1996 by paying £15 million for Blackburn Rovers and England striker Alan Shearer, one of the most prolific goalscorers of that era.

In 2017, Newcastle was the venue for the 2017 Freedom City festival, which commemorated the 50 years since Martin Luther King's visit to the city, where he received his honorary degree from Newcastle University. In 2018, Newcastle hosted the Great Exhibition of the North, the largest event in England in 2018. The exhibition began on 22 June with an opening ceremony on the Tyne and ended on 9 September with the Great North Run weekend. The exhibition describes the story of the north of England through its innovators, artists, designers and businesses.

In 2019, a travel site named Newcastle to be the friendliest city in the UK.

== Geography ==
Dean Street, a street in Newcastle with historic buildings

Since 1974, Newcastle has been a part of the metropolitan county of Tyne and Wear in North East England. The city is located on the north-western bank of the Tyne, approximately 46 miles (74 km) south of the border with Scotland.

The ground beneath the city is formed from Carboniferous strata of the Middle Pennine Coal Measures Group; this is a suite of sandstones, mudstones and coal seams, which generally dip moderately eastwards. To the west of the city are the Upper Pennine Coal Measures and further west again the sandstones and mudstones of the Stainmore Formation, the local equivalent of the Millstone Grit.

In large parts, Newcastle still retains a medieval street layout. Narrow alleys or 'chares', most of which can only be traversed by foot, still exist in abundance, particularly around the riverside. Stairs from the riverside to higher parts of the city centre and the extant Castle Keep, originally recorded in the 14th century, remain intact in places. Close, Sandhill and Quayside contain modern buildings as well as structures dating from the 15th–18th centuries, including Bessie Surtees House, the Cooperage and Lloyds Quayside Bars, Derwentwater House and House of Tides, a restaurant situated at a Grade I-listed 16th century merchant's house at 28–30 Close.

Grey Street, in the neoclassical centre

The city has an extensive neoclassical centre referred to as Tyneside Classical, largely developed in the 1830s by Richard Grainger and John Dobson. More recently, Newcastle architecture considered to be Tyneside Classical has been extensively restored. Broadcaster and writer Stuart Maconie described Newcastle as England's best-looking city; the German-born British scholar of architecture, Nikolaus Pevsner, describes Grey Street as one of the finest streets in England.

In 1948, the poet Sir John Betjeman said of Grey Street, "As for the curve of Grey Street, I shall never forget seeing it to perfection, traffic-less on a misty Sunday morning." The street curves down from Grey's Monument towards the valley of the Tyne and was voted England's finest street in 2005 in a survey of BBC Radio 4 listeners. In the Google Street View awards of 2010, Grey Street came 3rd in the British picturesque category. A portion of Grainger Town was demolished in the 1960s to make way for the Eldon Square Shopping Centre, including all but one side of the original Eldon Square itself.

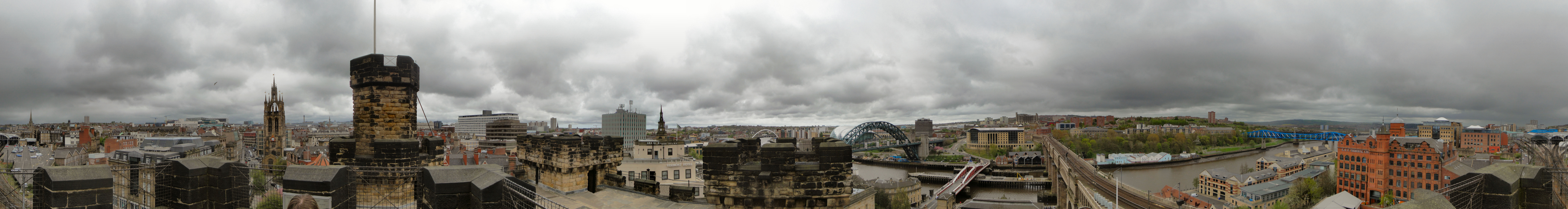
360° panoramic shot taken from the top of the Keep

Immediately to the north-west of the city centre is Leazes Park, first opened to the public in 1873 after a petition by 3,000 working men of the city for "ready access to some open ground for the purpose of health and recreation." Just outside one corner of this is St James' Park, stadium, which dominates the view of the city from all directions.

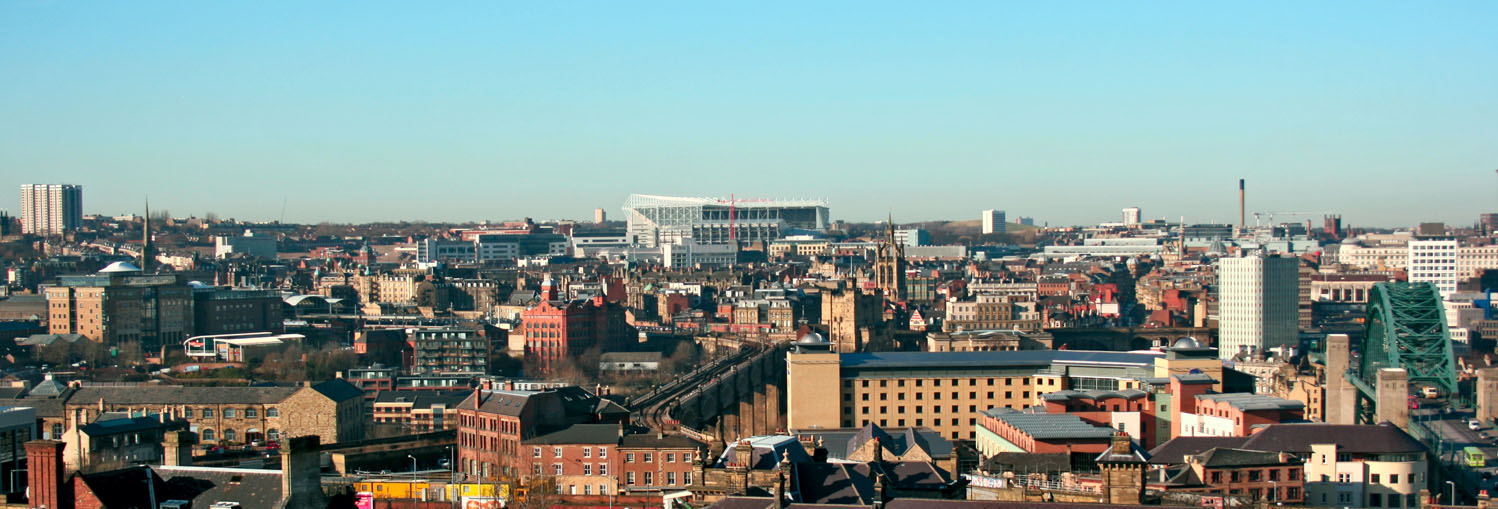
View of St James' Park on the skyline and surrounding buildings, as seen from Gateshead

Another major green space in the city is the Town Moor, lying immediately north of the city centre. It is larger than London's Hyde Park and Hampstead Heath put together and the freemen of the city have the right to graze cattle on it. The right extends to the pitch of St. James' Park, Newcastle United 's ground; this is not exercised, although the Freemen do collect rent for the loss of privilege. Honorary freemen include Bob Geldof, King Harald V of Norway, Bobby Robson, Alan Shearer, the late Nelson Mandela and the Royal Shakespeare Company. The Hoppings funfair, said to be the largest travelling funfair in Europe, is held here annually in June.

In the south-eastern corner of the Town Moor is Exhibition Park, which contains the only remaining pavilion from the North East Coast Exhibition of 1929. From the 1970s until 2006, this housed the Newcastle Military Vehicle Museum; which closed in 2006. The pavilion is now being used as a microbrewery and concert venue for Wylam Brewery.

=== Areas of the city ===
==== Ouseburn ====
The wooded gorge of the Ouseburn in the east of the city is known as Jesmond Dene and forms another recreation area, linked by Armstrong Park and Heaton Park to the Ouseburn Valley, where the river finally reaches the Tyne.

The springtime dawn chorus at 55 degrees latitude has been described as one of the best in the world. The dawn chorus of the Jesmond Dene green space has been professionally recorded and has been used in various workplace and hospital rehabilitation facilities.

==== Quayside ====
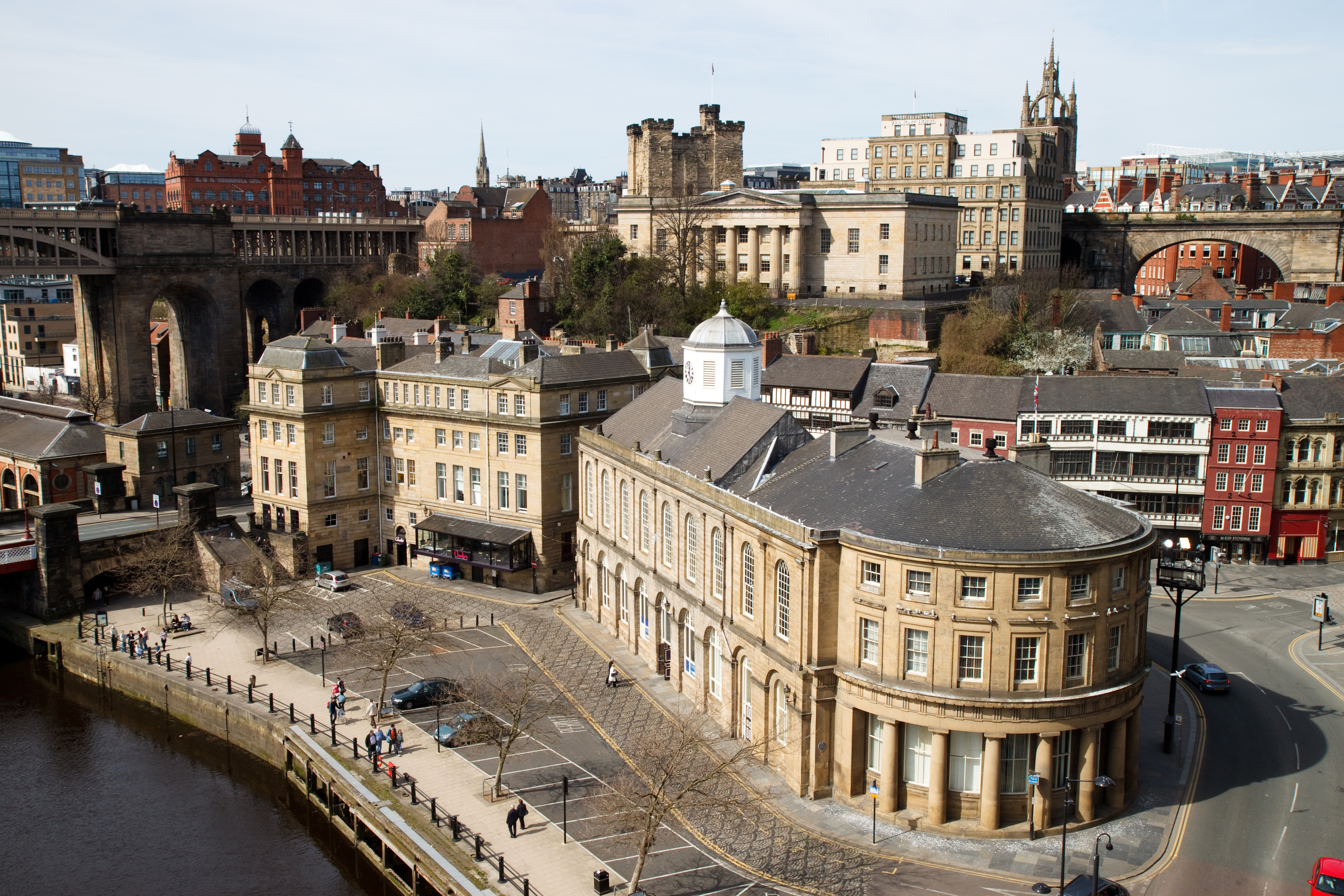
Quayside architecture, showing the historic Newcastle Guildhall with its white turret

The area around the Tyne Gorge, between Newcastle on the north bank and Gateshead on the south bank, is the famous Newcastle-Gateshead Quayside. It is famed for its series of dramatic bridges, including the Tyne Bridge of 1928 which was built by Dorman Long of Middlesbrough, Robert Stephenson's High Level Bridge of 1849, the first road/rail bridge in the world, and the Swing Bridge of 1876.

Large-scale regeneration efforts have led to the replacement of former shipping premises with new office developments; a tilting bridge - the Gateshead Millennium Bridge - integrated the Quayside more closely with the Gateshead Quayside, home to the BALTIC Centre for Contemporary Art (the venue for the Turner Prize 2011) and the Norman Foster-designed Glasshouse International Centre for Music. The Newcastle and Gateshead Quaysides are now a cosmopolitan area with bars, restaurants, hotels and public spaces.

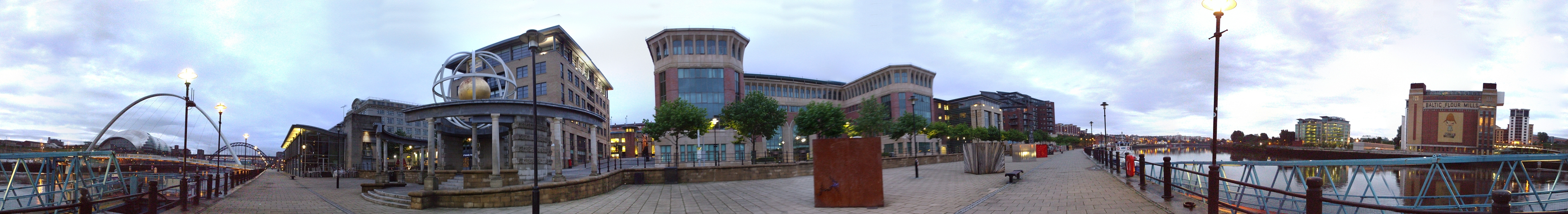
Seen here in 2008 on the Quayside is a Tyne Salmon Cube at right, an art exhibit celebrating Tyne salmon, which has since been removed

==== Grainger Town ====
Grainger Street, circa 1906

The historic heart of Newcastle is the Grainger Town area. Established on classical streets built by Richard Grainger, a builder and developer, between 1835 and 1842, some of Newcastle upon Tyne's finest buildings and streets lie within this area of the city centre including Grainger Market, Theatre Royal, Grey Street, Grainger Street and Clayton Street. These buildings are predominantly four stories high, with vertical dormers, domes, turrets and spikes. Richard Grainger was said to 'have found Newcastle of bricks and timber and left it in stone'. Of Grainger Town's 450 buildings, 244 are listed, of which 29 are grade I and 49 are grade II*.

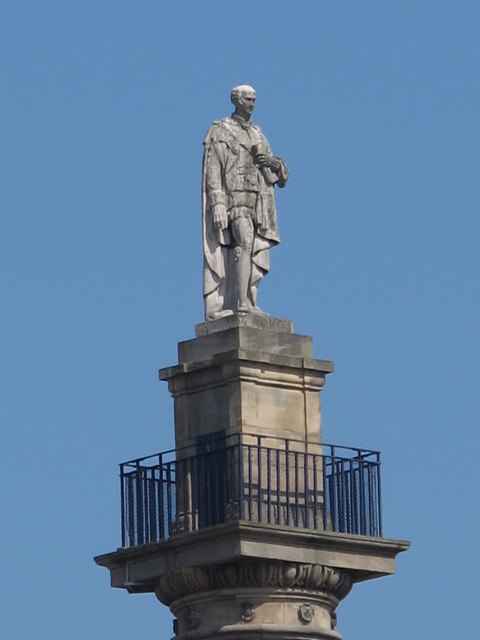
Grey's Monument

Grey's Monument, which commemorates prime minister Earl Grey and his Reform Act of 1832, stands above Monument Metro station and was designed and built by Edward Hodges Baily and Benjamin Green. Hodges, who also built Nelson's Column, designed and built the statue, and the monument plinth was designed and built by Benjamin Green.

The Exchange buildings, in Grainger Town

The Grainger Market replaced an earlier market originally built in 1808 called the Butcher Market. The Grainger Market was Newcastle's first indoor market. At the time of its opening in 1835, it was said to be one of the largest and most beautiful markets in Europe. The opening was celebrated with a grand dinner attended by 2000 guests and the Laing Art Gallery has a painting of this event. With the exception of the timber roof which was destroyed by a fire in 1901 and replaced by latticed-steel arches the Market is largely in its original condition. The Grainger Market architecture, like most in Grainger Town, which are either grade I or II listed, was listed grade I in 1954 by English Heritage.

The development of the city in the 1960s saw the demolition of part of Grainger Town as a prelude to the modernist rebuilding initiatives of T. Dan Smith, the leader of Newcastle City Council. A corruption scandal was uncovered involving Smith and John Poulson, a property developer from Pontefract in West Yorkshire, and both were imprisoned. Echoes of the scandal were revisited in the late 1990s in the BBC TV series, Our Friends in the North.

==== Chinatown ====
Newcastle's Chinatown arch

Newcastle's thriving Chinatown lies to the north-west of Grainger Town, centred on Stowell Street. A new Chinese arch, or paifang, providing a landmark entrance, was handed over to the city with a ceremony in 2005.

=== Housing ===
The Tyneside flat was the dominant housing form constructed at the time when the industrial centres on Tyneside were growing most rapidly. They can still be found in areas such as South Heaton in Newcastle but once dominated the streetscape on both sides of the Tyne. Tyneside flats were built as terraces, one of each pair of doors led to an upstairs flat while the other led into the ground-floor flat, each of two or three rooms. A new development in the Ouseburn valley has recreated them; Architects Cany Ash and Robert Sakula were attracted by the possibilities of high density without building high and getting rid of common areas.

In terms of housing stock, the authority is one of few authorities to see the proportion of detached homes rise in the 2010 Census (to 7.8%), in this instance this was coupled with a similar rise in flats and waterside apartments to 25.6%, and the proportion of converted or shared houses in 2011 renders this dwelling type within the highest of the five colour-coded brackets at 5.9%; this was on a par with Oxford and Reading, greater than Manchester and Liverpool and below a handful of historic densely occupied, arguably overinflated markets in the local authorities: Harrogate, Cheltenham, Bath, inner London, Hastings, Brighton and Royal Tunbridge Wells.

Significant Newcastle housing developments include Ralph Erskine's the Byker Wall designed in the 1960s and is now Grade II* listed. It is on UNESCO's list of outstanding 20th-century buildings. The Byker Redevelopment has won the first Veronica Rudge Green Prize in Urban Design in 1988.

=== Climate ===
Newcastle has an oceanic climate (Köppen: Cfb). Data in Newcastle was first collected in 1802 by the solicitor James Losh. Situated in the rain shadow of the North Pennines, Newcastle is amongst the driest cities in the UK. Temperature extremes recorded at Newcastle Weather Centre include 37.0 °C (98.6 °F) set on 19 July 2022 down to −14.0 °C (6.8 °F) on 29 December 1995. Newcastle can have cool to cold winters, though usually milder than the rural areas around it; summers range from pleasant to fairly warm, with very long daylight hours in comparison to all other major English cities. Newcastle upon Tyne shares the same latitude as Copenhagen, southern Sweden and Moscow.

Unlike more western, windward areas of the British Isles affected by heavy rain (that tends to be concentrated in the cooler months), Newcastle has less seasonal variation in rainfall and less rainfall overall compared to the UK average. Snowfall is not the norm and often light. Despite snowfall becoming even less frequent due to the effects of climate change, Newcastle nevertheless receives more than most major English cities, with any given year averaging 5-10 days of lying snow.

The nearest weather station to provide sunshine statistics is at Durham, about 14 miles (23 km) south of Newcastle city centre. Durham's inland, less urbanised setting results in night-time temperature data about one degree cooler than Newcastle throughout the year.

Climate data for Newcastle, 1991–2020, (Met Office Durham) Extremes Newcastle 1974–2005
Month	Jan	Feb	Mar	Apr	May	Jun	Jul	Aug	Sep	Oct	Nov	Dec	Year
Record high °C (°F)	14.5 (58.1)	16.3 (61.3)	20.7 (69.3)	22.7 (72.9)	27.2 (81.0)	30.4 (86.7)	37.9 (100.2)	32.5 (90.5)	26.2 (79.2)	25.0 (77.0)	17.5 (63.5)	16.2 (61.2)	37.9 (100.2)
Mean daily maximum °C (°F)	6.9 (44.4)	7.8 (46.0)	9.9 (49.8)	12.5 (54.5)	15.4 (59.7)	18.0 (64.4)	20.2 (68.4)	19.9 (67.8)	17.4 (63.3)	13.5 (56.3)	9.7 (49.5)	7.1 (44.8)	13.2 (55.8)
Daily mean °C (°F)	4.1 (39.4)	4.6 (40.3)	6.2 (43.2)	8.3 (46.9)	10.9 (51.6)	13.6 (56.5)	15.8 (60.4)	15.6 (60.1)	13.3 (55.9)	10.0 (50.0)	6.6 (43.9)	4.2 (39.6)	9.5 (49.1)
Mean daily minimum °C (°F)	1.3 (34.3)	1.4 (34.5)	2.5 (36.5)	4.1 (39.4)	6.5 (43.7)	9.3 (48.7)	11.3 (52.3)	11.3 (52.3)	9.2 (48.6)	6.5 (43.7)	3.6 (38.5)	1.4 (34.5)	5.7 (42.3)
Record low °C (°F)	−13.3 (8.1)	−8.4 (16.9)	−7.3 (18.9)	−2.9 (26.8)	−0.5 (31.1)	2.7 (36.9)	6.1 (43.0)	5.3 (41.5)	2.9 (37.2)	−2.7 (27.1)	−8.0 (17.6)	−8.8 (16.2)	−13.3 (8.1)
Average precipitation mm (inches)	51.8 (2.04)	44.6 (1.76)	41.1 (1.62)	51.2 (2.02)	44.4 (1.75)	61.0 (2.40)	60.9 (2.40)	66.5 (2.62)	56.9 (2.24)	63.4 (2.50)	73.0 (2.87)	61.0 (2.40)	675.7 (26.60)
Average precipitation days (≥ 1.0 mm)	11.8	9.9	8.6	9.1	8.6	9.9	10.7	10.3	9.4	11.8	12.0	12.0	124.1
Mean monthly sunshine hours	60.9	84.4	121.7	160.8	187.1	167.1	174.3	167.3	135.3	98.9	64.6	57.6	1,480
Source 1: Met Office
Source 2: Starlings Roost Weather

Climate data for Newcastle, United Kingdom (1981–2010)
Month	Jan	Feb	Mar	Apr	May	Jun	Jul	Aug	Sep	Oct	Nov	Dec	Year
Mean daily maximum °C (°F)	8.2 (46.8)	8.5 (47.3)	10.2 (50.4)	12.1 (53.8)	14.9 (58.8)	17.2 (63.0)	19.1 (66.4)	18.9 (66.0)	17.0 (62.6)	13.8 (56.8)	10.6 (51.1)	8.5 (47.3)	13.3 (55.9)
Daily mean °C (°F)	5.4 (41.7)	5.4 (41.7)	6.8 (44.2)	8.2 (46.8)	10.7 (51.3)	13.2 (55.8)	15.1 (59.2)	15.0 (59.0)	13.2 (55.8)	10.5 (50.9)	7.6 (45.7)	5.7 (42.3)	9.7 (49.5)
Mean daily minimum °C (°F)	2.5 (36.5)	2.3 (36.1)	3.3 (37.9)	4.2 (39.6)	6.5 (43.7)	9.2 (48.6)	11.1 (52.0)	11.0 (51.8)	9.4 (48.9)	7.1 (44.8)	4.5 (40.1)	2.9 (37.2)	6.2 (43.1)
Average rainfall mm (inches)	106.6 (4.20)	74.8 (2.94)	80.4 (3.17)	63.2 (2.49)	66.8 (2.63)	68.3 (2.69)	60.5 (2.38)	81.8 (3.22)	73.6 (2.90)	100.0 (3.94)	105.3 (4.15)	101.9 (4.01)	983.2 (38.72)
Average rainy days	14.2	10.6	12.7	10.4	11.2	10.1	10.0	11.3	10.0	13.0	13.4	13.2	140.1
Source: World Meteorological Organization

=== Environment ===
The city is located within the centre of the North East Green Belt, also known as the Tyne and Wear Green Belt.

The green belts stated aims are to:

- Prevent the merging of settlements
- Safeguard the countryside from encroachment
- Check unrestricted urban sprawl
- Assist in urban regeneration in the city-region by encouraging the recycling of derelict and other urban land.

The green belt surrounds Brunswick Village, Dinnington, Callerton, Hazlerigg, Throckley, Walbottle and Woolsington. Popular locations such as Ryton Island, Tyne Riverside Country Park, the city's golf courses, Newcastle Racecourse and Newcastle International Airport fall inside the green belt.

The city has been recognised for its commitment to environmental issues, with a programme planned for Newcastle to become "the first carbon neutral city" however, those plans have been revised and they now hope to be carbon neutral by 2050.

=== Demographics ===
==== Population ====
Newcastle upon Tyne population pyramid in 2021

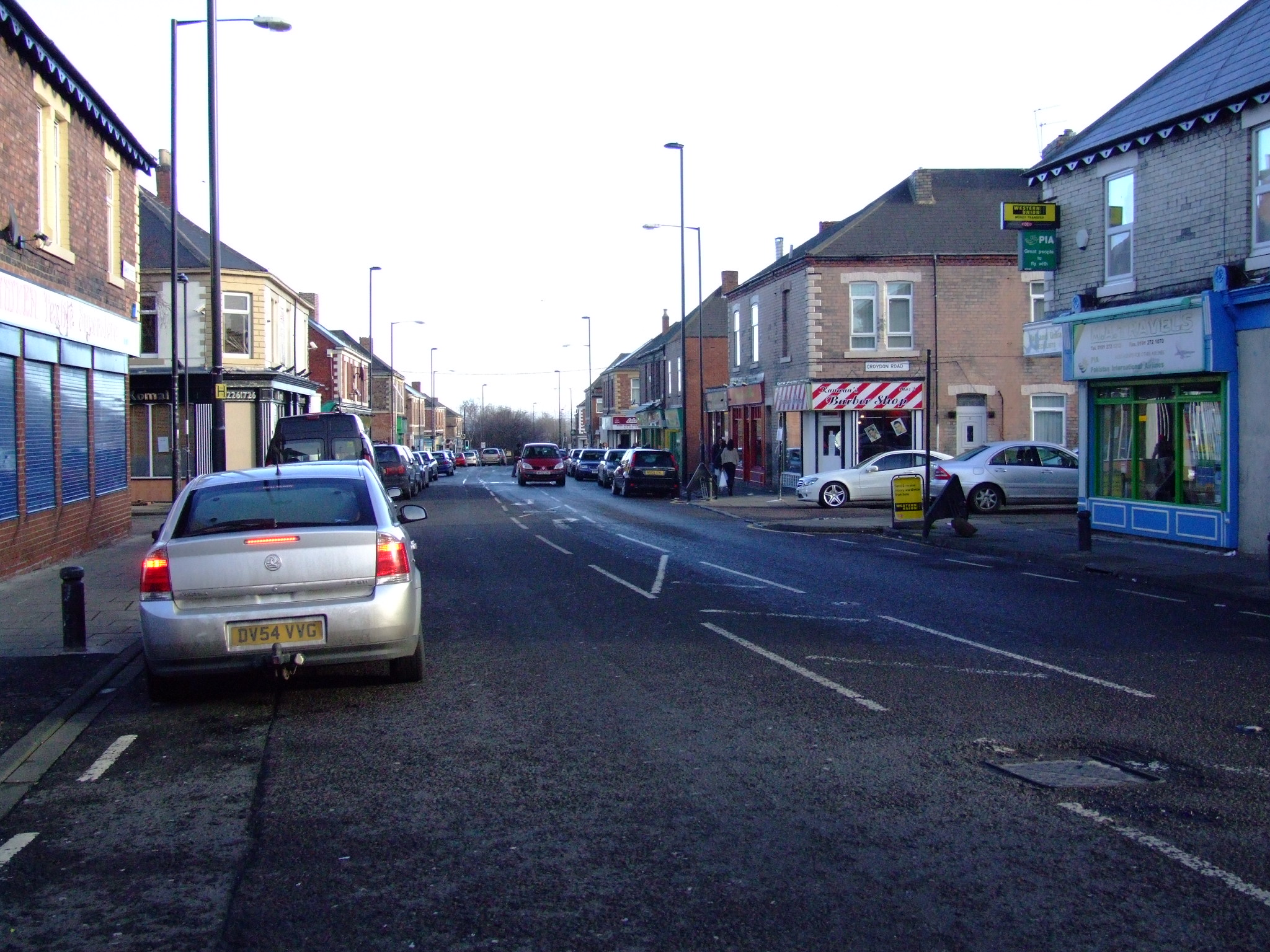
Stanhope Street in Arthur's Hill is home to one of the largest Asian communities in North East England

According to the Office for National Statistics, Newcastle had an estimated population of 333,975 in 2025. Tyneside (made up of Newcastle and the surrounding metropolitan boroughs of Gateshead, North Tyneside and South Tyneside) has a population of approximately 880,000, making it the eighth most populous urban area in the UK. The wider metropolitan area of Tyneside-Wearside has a population of approximately 1,122,000.

Additionally, Newcastle is home to a large temporary population of students from Newcastle and Northumbria universities. Areas of suburban Newcastle with significant student populations include Jesmond, Shieldfield, Gosforth, Sandyford, Spital Tongues and Heaton.

Year	Population
1801	33,322
1851	80,184
1901	246,905
1911	293,944
1921	309,820
1931	326,576
1941	333,286
1951	340,155
1961	323,844
1971	308,317
1981	272,923
1991	277,723
2001	259,573
2011	292,200
2019	302,820
2024	331,420

==== Age ====
According to the same statistics, the average age of people living in Newcastle is 37.8 years, compared to the national average of 38.6.

==== Religion ====
From the 2011 Census, two significant religions could be identified in the city: Christian and Muslim. 56.6% of Newcastle identified as Christian and 6.3% as Muslim. Over 28% stated they have no religious affiliation.

==== Ethnicity and nationality ====
According to the 2011 census, the metropolitan borough of Newcastle upon Tyne was predominately white, representing 85.3% of the population (including non-British white). Asians made up 9.8% of the population (2.3% Pakistani, 1.7% Bangladeshi, 1.8% Indian, 2.2% Chinese and 1.8% Asian other). Black people make up a small proportion of the population (1.7% Black African, 0.1% Black Caribbean and 0.1% Black other), as do mixed race groups at 1.6% (0.6% Asian and White, 0.3% White and Caribbean, 0.3% White and African, 0.4% White and Other). The smallest significantly sized individual ethnic minority community in Newcastle is Arab at 0.9%. The remainder of the population, 0.5%, consists of other ethnicities.

Large populations of ethnic minorities can be found in areas such as Elswick, Wingrove and Arthurs Hill.

According to the 2011 UK Census, those born outside the UK were mainly from India (3,315), China (3,272), Pakistan (2,644), Bangladesh (2,276), Poland (1,473), Germany (1,357), Nigeria (1,226), Iran (1,164), Hong Kong (1,038) and Ireland (942). In the North East, Newcastle was the most ethnically diverse district, followed by Middlesbrough.

There are also small but significant Chinese, Jewish and Eastern European populations. The International Organization for Migration states there are estimated to be between 500 and 2,000 Bolivians in Newcastle, one of the largest populations in any city in the UK.

Ethnic Group	Year									
Ethnic Group	1981 estimations		1991 census		2001 census		2011 census		2021 census	
Ethnic Group	Number	%	Number	%	Number	%	Number	%	Number	%
White: Total	274,972	97.2%	266,824	95.9%	241,684	93.1%	239,533	85.5%	240,002	80%
White: British	–	–	–	–	235,259	90.6%	229,520	81.9%	223,567	74.5%
White: Irish	–	–	–	–	1,733		1,826		1,895	0.6%
White: Gypsy or Irish Traveller	–	–	–	–	–	–	163		332	0.1%
White: Roma	–	–							1,031	0.3%
White: Other	–	–	–	–	4,692		8,024		13,177	4.4%
Asian or Asian British: Total	6,314	2.2%	9,281	3.3%	13,243	5.1%	27,107	9.7%	34,128	11.3%
Asian or Asian British: Indian	1,851		2,388		3,098		5,072		7,304	2.4%
Asian or Asian British: Pakistani	2,367		3,196		4,842		6,364		8,753	2.9%
Asian or Asian British: Bangladeshi	612		1,426		2,607		4,692		7,248	2.4%
Asian or Asian British: Chinese	821		1,220		1,871		6,037		5,382	1.8%
Asian or Asian British: Other Asian	663		1,051		825		4,942		5,441	1.8%
Black or Black British: Total	807		1,020		959	0.4%	5,160	1.8%	9,921	3.3%
Black or Black British: Caribbean	173		211		133		217		340	0.1%
Black or Black British: African	418		528		738		4,664		8,555	2.9%
Black or Black British: Other Black	216		281		88		279		1,026	0.3%
Mixed or British Mixed: Total	–	–	–	–	2,290	0.9%	4,279	1.5%	6,920	2.4%
Mixed: White and Black Caribbean	–	–	–	–	398		830		915	0.3%
Mixed: White and Black African	–	–	–	–	403		859		1,378	0.5%
Mixed: White and Asian	–	–	–	–	912		1,609		2,600	0.9%
Mixed: Other Mixed	–	–	–	–	577		981		2,027	0.7%
Other: Total	778		1074		1,360	0.5%	4,098	1.5%	9,156	3.1%
Other: Arab	–	–	–	–	–	–	2,602		4,175	1.4%
Other: Any other ethnic group	–	–			1,360	0.5%	1,496		4,981	1.7%
Ethnic minority: Total	7,899	2.8%	11,375	4.1%						
Total	282,871	100%	278,199	100%	259,536	100%	280,177	100%	300,127	100%

== Governance ==
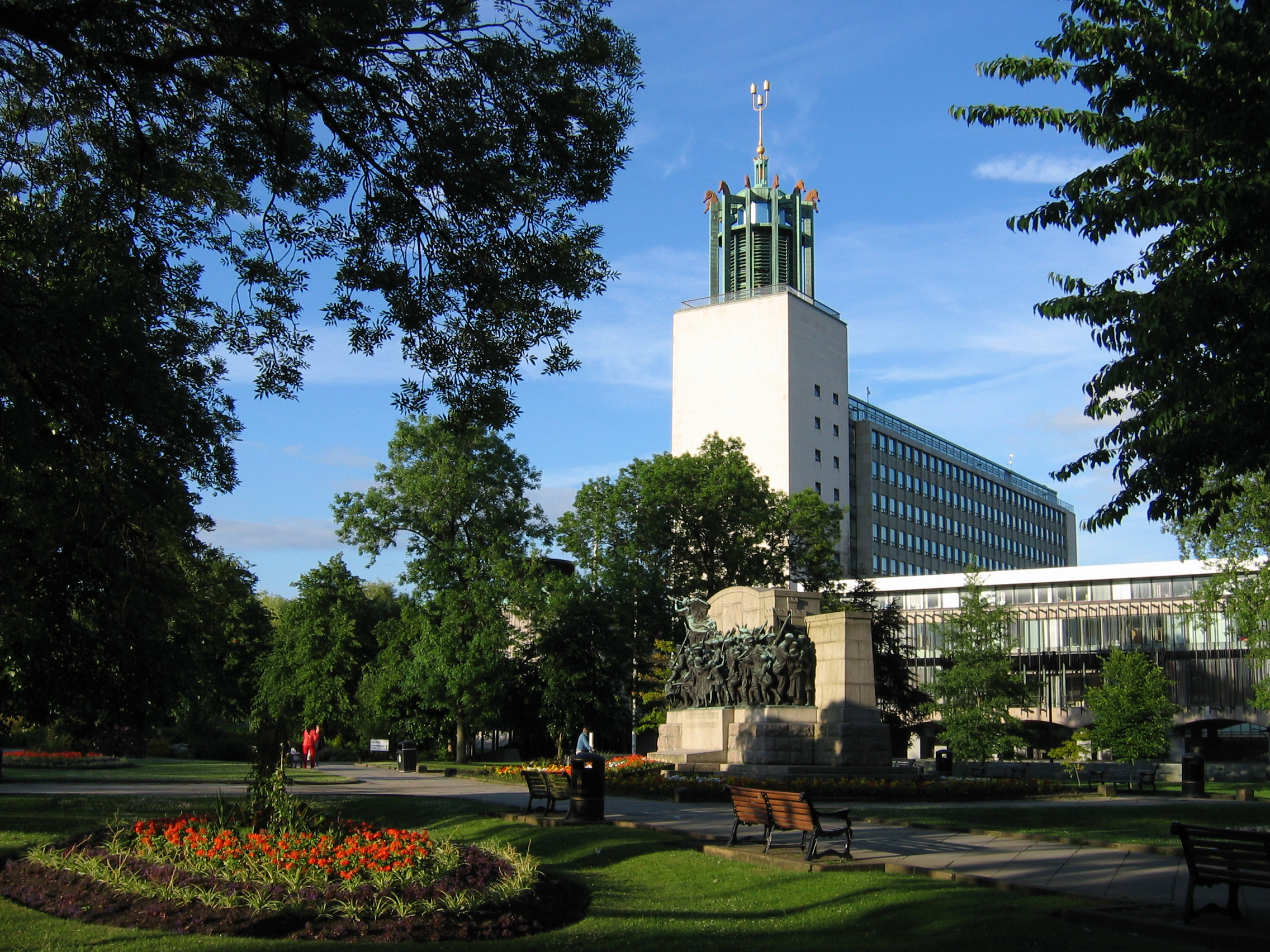
Newcastle Civic Centre, meeting place of the City Council

Newcastle is a metropolitan borough with city status, governed by Newcastle City Council. There are six civil parishes within the city boundaries, at Blakelaw and North Fenham, Brunswick, Dinnington, Hazlerigg, North Gosforth and Woolsington, which form an additional tier of local government for their areas. The rest of the city is an unparished area.

The city council is based at Newcastle Civic Centre in Haymarket, which opened in 1968.

=== Administrative history ===
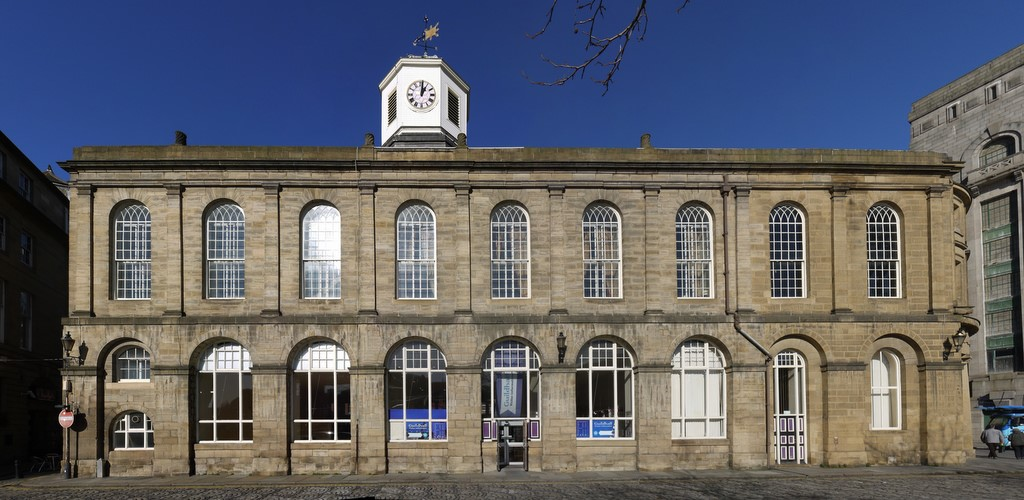
Guildhall, built 1655: Town council's headquarters until 1863

Newcastle was an ancient borough. It is said to have been made a borough by William II (reigned 1087–1100), although the earliest known charter was granted by Henry II (reigned 1154–1189). In 1400, a new charter from Henry IV gave the borough the right to hold its own courts and appoint its own sheriffs, making it a county corporate, independent from the Sheriff of Northumberland. Whilst administratively independent, Newcastle was still deemed part of the geographical county of Northumberland for the purposes of lieutenancy until 1974.

The Northumberland assizes were held at the Castle in Newcastle, and subsequently at the Moot Hall, built within the castle site in 1811. The Moot Hall also served as the meeting place of Northumberland County Council from its creation in 1889 until 1981 when the county council moved to Morpeth. Newcastle was therefore sometimes described as the county town of Northumberland, although that title was also claimed by Alnwick, where knights of the shire were elected until the Reform Act 1832.

Until the 1830s, the borough just covered the four parishes of All Saints, St Andrew, St John and St Nicholas. The parliamentary borough (constituency) was enlarged in 1832 to also take in Byker, Elswick, Heaton, Jesmond and Westgate. The municipal boundaries were enlarged to match the constituency in 1836, when Newcastle was reformed to become a municipal borough under the Municipal Corporations Act 1835, which standardised how most boroughs operated across the country.

Newcastle was awarded city status in 1882. When elected county councils were established in 1889, Newcastle was considered large enough to provide its own county-level services and so it was made a county borough. The city boundaries were enlarged on several occasions, notably in 1904 when it absorbed Benwell, Fenham and Walker, and in 1935 when it absorbed Kenton and parts of neighbouring parishes. In 1906, the city was given the right to appoint a Lord Mayor.

In 1974, the county borough was replaced by a larger metropolitan borough within the new county of Tyne and Wear. The borough gained the area of the former urban districts of Gosforth and Newburn, and the parishes of Brunswick, Dinnington, Hazlerigg, North Gosforth and Woolsington. It also gained the Moot Hall, which until 1974 had been an exclave of the administrative county of Northumberland surrounded by the city. Newcastle's city status was transferred to the enlarged borough at the same time.

From 1974 until 1986, the city council was a lower-tier district authority, with Tyne and Wear County Council providing county-level services. The county council was abolished in 1986, since when the city council has again provided both district-level and county-level services, as it had done when it was a county borough prior to 1974. Some functions are provided across Tyne and Wear by joint committees with the other districts. The county of Tyne and Wear continues to exist as a ceremonial county for the purposes of lieutenancy but has had no administrative functions since 1986.

Newcastle was part of a North East Combined Authority (2014–2024); in 2018, after disputes with some of the other councils, it left to create the North of Tyne Combined Authority, which it was a part of until 2024. Since then, the council has been a member of the North East Combined Authority, which replaced both combined authorities.

=== Coat of arms ===
Newcastle's coat of arms dates back to the 14th century and can be described as canting: Gules three castles triple towered argent. The supporters are two seahorses, reflecting the fact that the city developed as a port. The crest is another three-towered silver castle with a gold demi-lion guardant on it holding the flag of England in pennant form. The motto is the Latin phrase Fortiter Defendit Triumphans (Triumphing by brave defence) and was added in the 1640s after Newcastle successfully resisted a Scottish invasion during the English Civil War.

The arms should not be confused with the similar arms of the Scottish city of Aberdeen, which has towers instead of castles and a royal tressure.

=== National representation ===
Newcastle is represented by three elected Members of Parliament (MPs) in the House of Commons, the lower house of the Parliament of the United Kingdom. All three current MPs are from the Labour Party:

Newcastle upon Tyne Central and West	Newcastle upon Tyne East and Wallsend	Newcastle upon Tyne North
Chi Onwurah	Mary Glindon	Catherine McKinnell

=== EU membership referendum ===
In the 2016 United Kingdom European Union membership referendum, Newcastle voted for the United Kingdom to remain in the European Union, with a ratio of 51:49 in favour of remain, compared to a national ratio of 48:52 in favour of leave.

== Economy ==
The city's economy is diverse with major economic output in science, finance, retail, education, tourism and nightlife. Newcastle is one of the UK Core Cities, as well as part of the Eurocities network.

Newcastle played a major role during the 19th-century Industrial Revolution, and was a leading centre for coal mining, shipbuilding, engineering, munitions and manufacturing. Heavy industries in Newcastle declined in the second half of the 20th century; with office, service and retail employment now becoming the city's staples.

Today, Newcastle's economy contributes around £13 billion to the UK GVA. This figure is mostly produced by corporate activity in the city centre.

The city's thriving nightlife is estimated to be worth £340 million per year and consequently is seen as a major contributor to Newcastle's economy.

The UK's first biotechnology village, the Centre for Life, is located by Central Station; it was the first step in the City Council's plans to transform Newcastle into a science city.

=== Retail ===
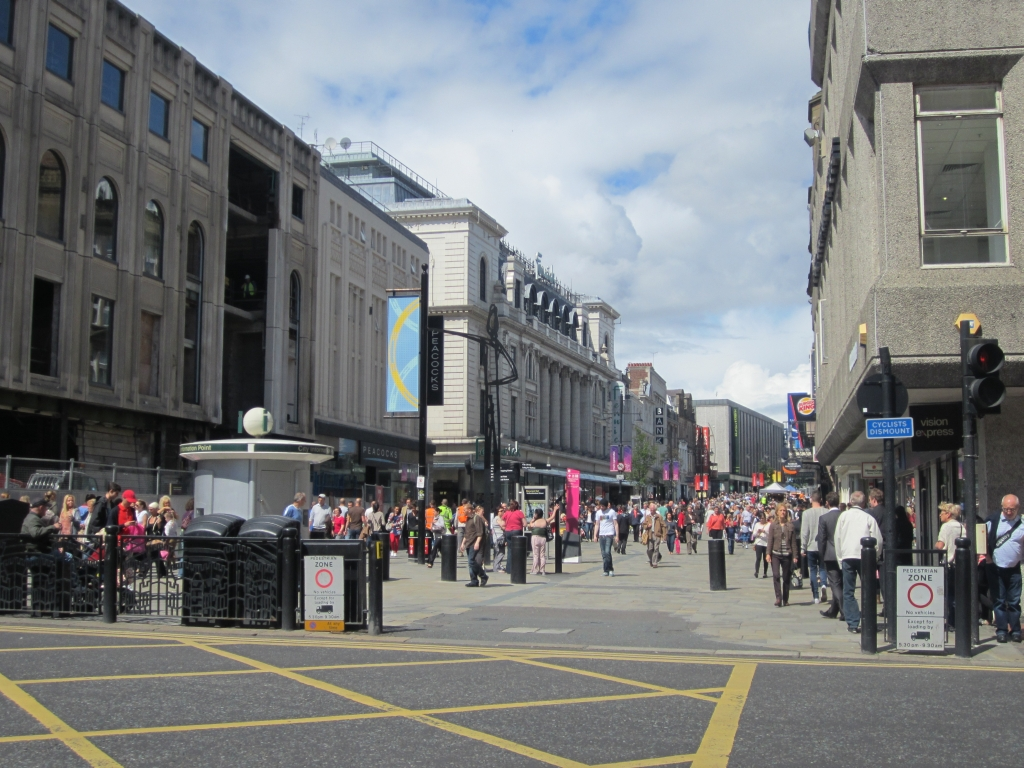
South entrance of Northumberland Street, now pedestrianised

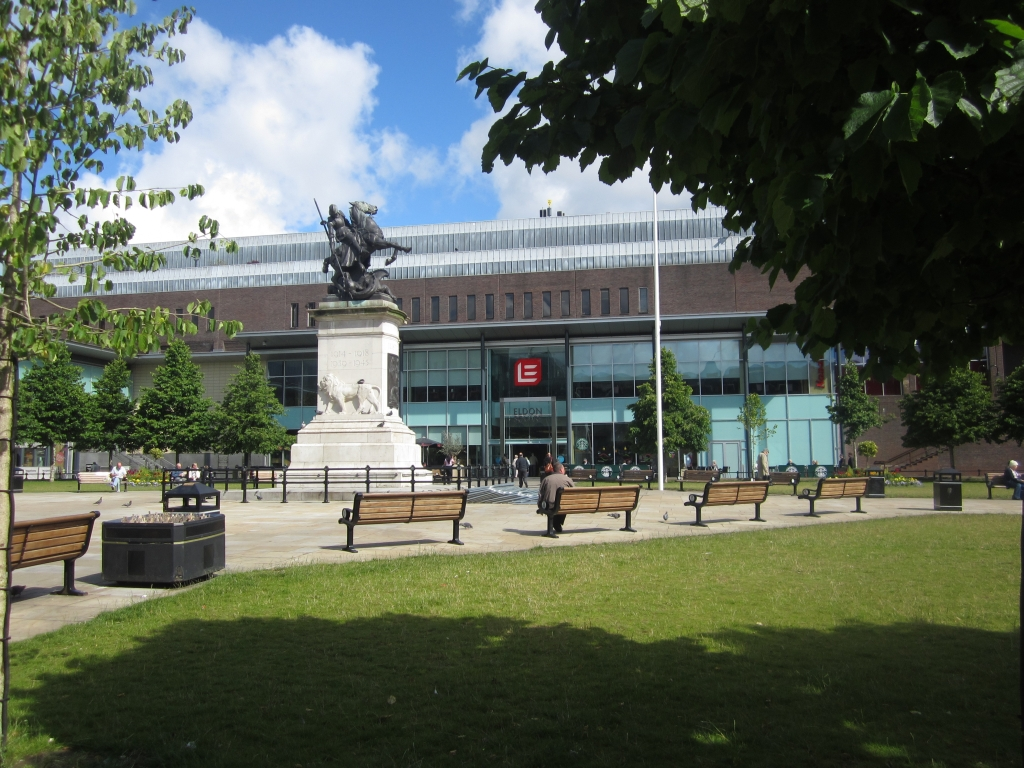
Old Eldon Square;, the Eldon Square shopping centre was built around it

In 2010, Newcastle was positioned ninth in the retail centre expenditure league of the UK. There are several major shopping areas in Newcastle city centre. The largest of these is the Eldon Square Shopping Centre, one of the largest city centre shopping complexes in the UK. It has one of the largest John Lewis & Partners stores in the UK. This John Lewis branch was formerly known as Bainbridge, established in 1838, often cited as the world's first department store. Emerson Bainbridge (1817–1892), a pioneer and the founder of Bainbridge, sold goods via department, a new arrangement of trade for that time. The Bainbridge official ledgers reported revenue by department, giving birth to the name department store.

Eldon Square is currently undergoing a full redevelopment. A new bus station, replacing the old underground bus station, was officially opened in March 2007. The wing of the centre, including the undercover Green Market, near Grainger Street was demolished in 2007 so that the area could be redeveloped. This was completed in February 2010 with the opening of a Debenhams department store as well as other major stores including Apple, Hollister and Guess.

Central Arcade, Newcastle upon Tyne

The main shopping street in the city is Northumberland Street. In a 2004 report, it was ranked as the most expensive shopping street in the UK for rent, outside London. It is home to two major department stores including the first and largest Fenwick department store, which houses some of the most luxurious designer labels and one of the largest Marks and Spencer stores outside London. Both stores have entrances into Eldon Square Shopping Centre.

Other shopping destinations in Newcastle include Grainger Street and the area around Grey's Monument, the relatively modern Eldon Garden and Monument Mall complexes, Central Arcade and the traditional Grainger Market. On Blackett Street can be found the silversmith Reid & Sons which was established in the city in 1788. Outside the city centre, the largest suburban shopping areas are Gosforth and Byker. From 2007, inside Kingston Park on the edge of Newcastle, the Tesco store was the largest Tesco hypermarket in the UK for a period of time.

Close to Newcastle, the MetroCentre in Gateshead is the largest indoor shopping centre in Europe.

=== Health ===
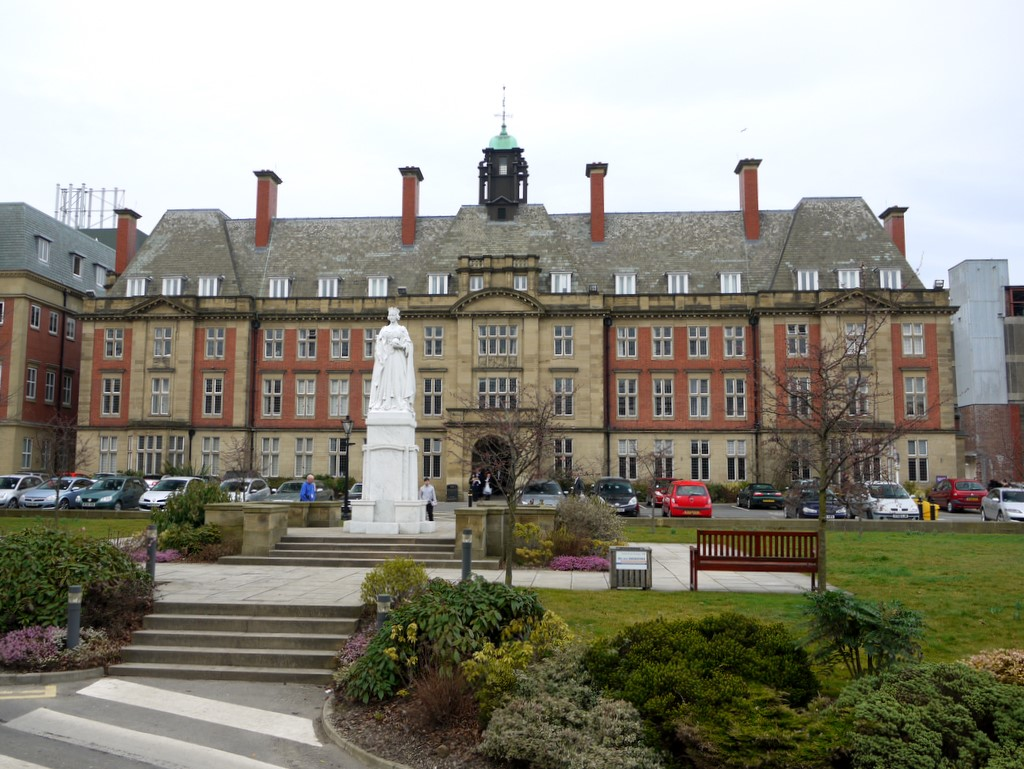
Royal Victoria Infirmary

According to research from 2011, public health and levels of deprivation in Newcastle upon Tyne was generally worse than average in England. As levels of deprivation is considerably higher than the nationwide average, sociologists argue that as a result, the life expectancy for both men and women is lower than the nationwide average. There is significant discrepancy between life expectancies in wealthy areas and deprived areas, with life expectancy up to 14.3 years lower for men and 11.1 years lower for women in deprived areas than in wealthy areas. From 2015 to 2019, Newcastle became relatively more deprived according to the Index of Multiple Deprivation.

From 2001 to 2011, as with all UK cities, all-cause mortality rates have fallen and life expectancy has increased. Early death rates from cancer, heart disease and strokes have fallen, but remain worse than the England average.

Almost 21.9% of Year 6 children are clinically obese. In 2014/5, 35.9% of 10 to 11-year-olds were classified as overweight or obese, in comparison to a national average of 33.2%. 54.9% of pupils meet the recommendation of at least three hours each week on school sport. Levels of teenage pregnancy are higher than the nationwide average. In 2011, GCSE attainment amongst school children was worse than the England average. Estimated numbers of adults 'healthy eating' are lower than the England average. Rates of smoking-related deaths and hospital stays for alcohol-related harm are higher than average.

Newcastle remains one of the few major cities in England to supply fluoridated water; this scheme is directed by Northumbria Water.

The city has two large teaching hospitals: the Royal Victoria Infirmary and the Freeman Hospital, which is also a pioneering centre for transplant surgery.

In a report, published in early February 2007 by the Ear Institute at the University College London and Widex, Newcastle was named as the noisiest city in the whole of the UK, with an average noise level of 80.4 decibels. The report claimed that these noise levels would have a negative long-term impact on the health of the city's residents. The report was criticised, however, for attaching too much weight to readings at arbitrarily selected locations, which in Newcastle's case included a motorway underpass without pedestrian access. As well as numerous parks, open spaces and extensive riverside areas, puzzlingly the report also overlooked the 1,000 acres (405 ha) Town Moor at the heart of the city. Larger than London's Hyde Park and Hampstead Heath combined, and even larger than New York's Central Park, the town moor dates back to the 12th century, with the land tenure and its use being regulated by an Act of Parliament.

== Education ==
=== Schools and colleges ===
Newcastle has 74 primary schools and 20 secondary schools, of which 13 are LEA-funded and seven are fee-paying independent schools.

There are a number of critically acclaimed state secondary schools, including Walker Riverside Academy, Gosforth Academy, Jesmond Park Academy, St Cuthbert's High School, St Mary's Catholic School, Kenton School, Sacred Heart High School, Excelsior Academy, Walbottle Academy and Benfield School.

The largest co-educational independent school is the Royal Grammar School. The largest girls' independent school is Newcastle High School for Girls. Both schools are located on the same street in Jesmond. Newcastle School for Boys is the only independent boys'-only school in the city and is situated in Gosforth. Other independent schools include Dame Allan's School.

Newcastle College is the largest general further education college in North East England and is a Beacon Status college. There are also two smaller further education colleges in Newcastle.

=== Universities ===
The city has two major universities:

- Newcastle University has its origins in the Durham University School of Medicine and Surgery, established in 1834. It became fully independent on 1 August 1963, forming the University of Newcastle upon Tyne (now simply Newcastle University). It is a red brick university and is a member of the Russell Group, an association of research-intensive UK universities, often considered to represent the best UK universities. It won the Sunday Times University of the Year award in 2000. It was awarded the Gold Award in the Teaching Excellence Framework (TEF), one of only ten Russell Group universities to achieve the Gold TEF rating.
- Northumbria University has its origins in Newcastle Polytechnic, established in 1969; it became the University of Northumbria at Newcastle in 1992, as part of the UK-wide process in which polytechnics became new universities. It was voted Best New University by The Times' Good University Guide 2005. It holds the Silver TEF Award.

=== Museums and galleries ===
There are several museums and galleries in Newcastle, including the Centre for Life with its Science Village; the Discovery Museum a museum highlighting life on Tyneside, including Tyneside's shipbuilding heritage and inventions which changed the world; the Great North Museum; in 2009, the Newcastle on Tyne Museum of Antiquities merged with the Great North Museum (Hancock Museum); Seven Stories, the National Centre for Children's Books; The Side Gallery opened in 1977 and displayed historical and contemporary photography from around the world and Northern England but it closed in 2023. Another former attraction was the Newburn Motor Museum which opened in 1979 but closed during the Covid pandemic.

The Laing Art Gallery, similarly to other art galleries and museums around the world, has collections digitised on the Google Cultural Institute, an initiative that makes important cultural material accessible on-line.

== Transport ==
=== Railway ===
Central Station

Newcastle Central is a principal station that is served by five train operating companies on the following routes:

- London North Eastern Railway: East Coast Main Line between London King's Cross, Edinburgh Waverley, Aberdeen and Inverness
- CrossCountry: on the Cross Country Route linking the city with destinations in Scotland, Yorkshire, the Midlands and the South West, including Edinburgh Waverley, Leeds, Sheffield, Birmingham New Street, Bristol Temple Meads and Plymouth
- Lumo: on the East Coast Main Line between Glasgow Central, Edinburgh Waverley and London Kings Cross
- Northern Trains: provide local and regional services to Carlisle, Hexham, Sunderland, Hartlepool and Middlesbrough
- TransPennine Express: operates services to Leeds, Manchester Victoria and Liverpool Lime Street.

In 2014, work was completed on refurbishing the station's historic entrance. Glazing was placed over the historic arches and the Victorian architecture was enhanced, transforming the 19th century public portico; it is one of only six Grade I listed railway stations in the UK. Opened in 1850 by Queen Victoria, it was the joint-first covered station in the world (Note: Joint with Liverpool Lime Street.) and was much copied across the UK. It has a neoclassical façade, originally designed by the architect John Dobson and was constructed in collaboration with Robert Stephenson. The station sightlines towards the Castle Keep, whilst showcasing the curvature of the station's arched roof. The first services were operated by the North Eastern Railway company.

The other main line station in the city is Manors, which is served by Northern Trains services.

=== Metro ===
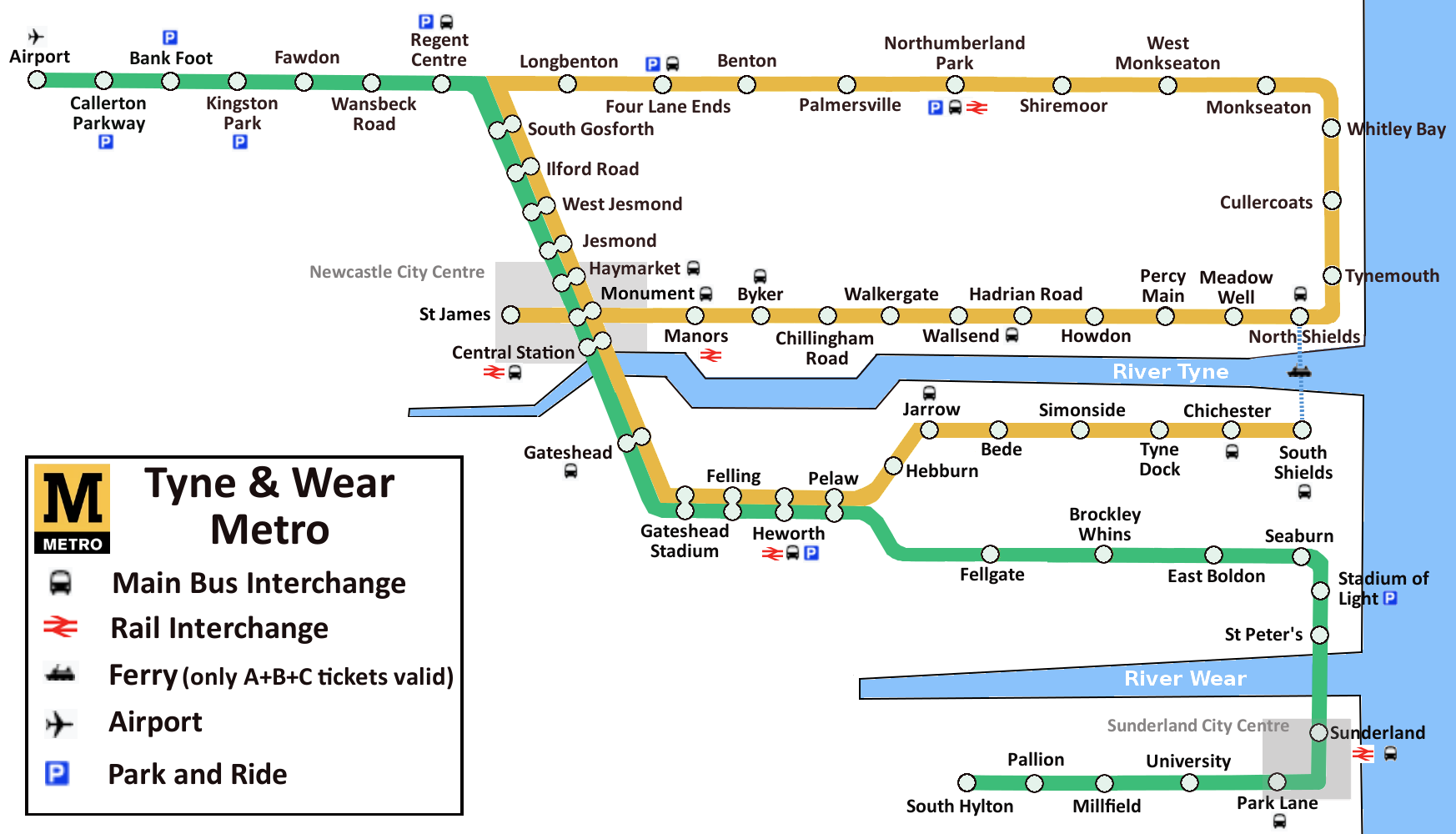
Map of the Tyne and Wear Metro

The city is served by the Tyne and Wear Metro, a system of suburban and underground railways covering much of Newcastle and the surrounding metropolitan boroughs. It was opened in five phases between 1980 and 1984; it was Britain's first urban light rail transit system. The network was developed from a combination of existing and newly built tracks and stations, with deep-level tunnels constructed through central Newcastle.

The Metro consists of two lines:

- Green: connects Newcastle Airport and South Hylton, via Central Station, Gateshead Interchange and Sunderland
- Yellow: joins St James and South Shields, via Byker, Whitley Bay, Central Station and Gateshead Interchange.

=== Buses ===
Roues in the borough are co-ordinated by Nexus; there are three main operators:

- Stagecoach North East is the primary bus operator in the city, running services between both the west and east ends, with some services extending out to the MetroCentre, Killingworth, Wallsend, Ponteland and Cramlington
- Go North East provides the majority of services to and from the south of the Tyne, linking the city with Gateshead, South Tyneside, Sunderland and County Durham
- Arriva North East runs services to the north of city, North Tyneside and Northumberland.

The city has two main bus stations for local and regional services: Haymarket bus station for services to the north and east, and Eldon Square bus station for services heading to the south and west. Newcastle coach station is the city's main hub for long-distance services, including by National Express and Flixbus.

Other major bus departure points are Pilgrim Street (for buses running south of the Tyne via Gateshead) and Blackett Street/Monument (for services to the East and West of the city). Many bus services also pass Central Station, a major interchange for rail and metro services.

=== Roads ===
Tyne Bridge

Major roads in the area include the A1 (Newcastle Gateshead Western By-pass), stretching north to Edinburgh and south to London; the A19 heading south past Sunderland and Middlesbrough to York and Doncaster; the A69 heading west to Carlisle; the A696, which becomes the A68 heads past the airport and up through central Northumberland and central Scottish Borders, the A167, the old Great North Road, heading south to Gateshead, Chester-le-Street, Durham and Darlington; and the A1058 Coast Road, which runs from Jesmond to the east coast between Tynemouth and Cullercoats.

Many of these designations are relatively recent; upon completion of the Western By-pass and its designation as the new line of the A1, the roads between this and the A1's former alignment through the Tyne Tunnel were renumbered, with many city centre roads changing from a 6-prefix to their present 1-prefix numbers.

In November 2011, the capacity of the Tyne Tunnel was increased when a project to build a second road tunnel and refurbish the first tunnel was completed.

=== Air ===
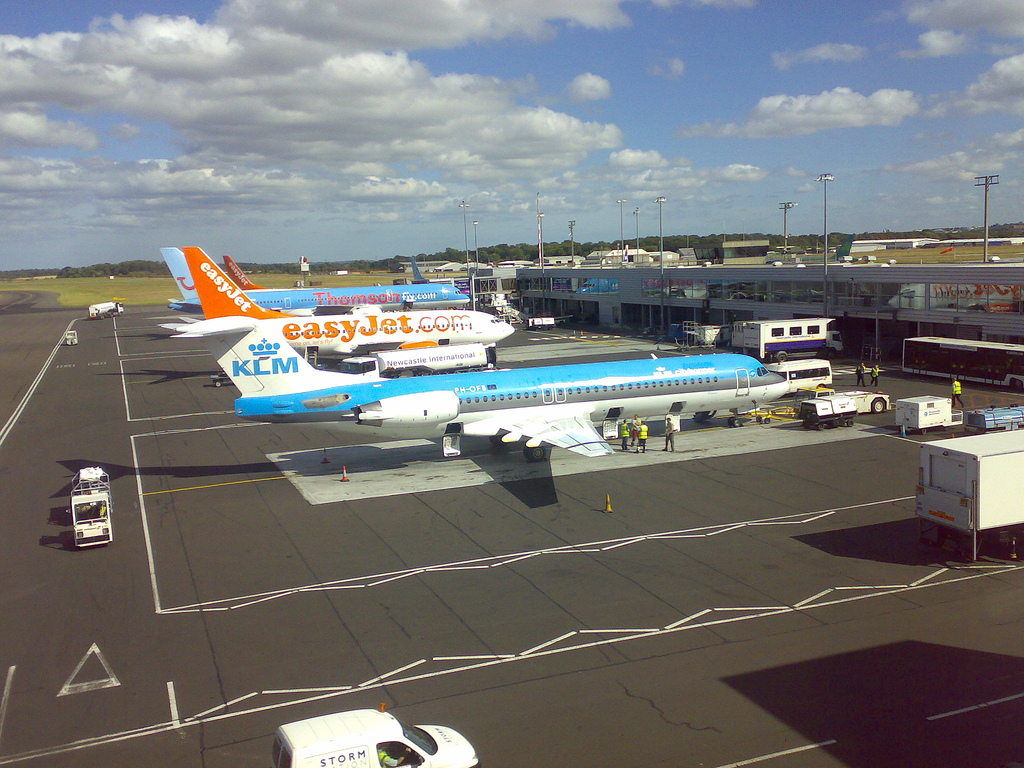
Aircraft at Newcastle International Airport

The airport is situated on the northern outskirts of the city at Woolsington, near to Ponteland. It is the largest and busiest airport in North East England and the second largest and busiest in Northern England, after Manchester, handling over five million passengers per year. As of 2026, Newcastle Airport operates flights to "over 80 destinations worldwide." The airport is served by numerous airlines including; Air France, British Airways, easyJet, Emirates, Eurowings, Jet2, KLM, Loganair, Ryanair and TUI Airways.

The airport is connected to the city centre by the Tyne and Wear Metro, with an average journey between Central Station and Airport taking approximately 26 minutes.

=== Cycling ===
Newcastle is accessible by several mostly traffic-free cycle routes that lead to the edges of the city centre, where cyclists can continue into the city by road, using no car lanes. The traffic-free C2C cycle route runs along the north bank of the Tyne, enabling cyclists to travel off-road to North Shields and Tynemouth in the east, and westwards towards Hexham.

Suburban cycle routes exist, which use converted trackbeds of former industrial wagonways and industrial railways. A network on Tyneside's suburban Victorian waggonways is being developed. A network of signed on-road cycle routes is being established, including some designated on-road cycle lanes that will lead from the city centre to the suburbs of Gosforth, Heaton and Wallsend.

Newcastle has a growing culture of bicycle usage and is the home to the Newcastle Cycling Campaign', which aims to model other European cities like Amsterdam and Copenhagen. The aims of the organisation are to:

- Raise the profile of cycling, especially utility cycling around the city
- Educate decision makers over the benefits of cycling
- Promote equality.

Following guidelines set in the National Cycling strategy, Newcastle first developed its own in 1998. As of 2012, the city council's social aims and objectives for cycling include: highlighting the usage of cycling to cut city congestion and educating that cycling promotes healthy living. The authority also has infrastructure aims and objectives which include: developing on road cycle networks on quieter streets; making safer routes on busier streets; innovating and implementing contraflows on one way streets; developing the existing off-road cycle route networks and improve signage; joining up routes that are partially or completely isolated; Increase the number of cycle parking facilities; working with employers to integrate cycling into workplace travel plans; link the local networks to national networks.

=== Water ===
DFDS Seaways runs a ferry service to IJmuiden, near Amsterdam, Netherlands, from Newcastle International Ferry Terminal, in North Shields. The DFDS ferry service to Gothenburg, Sweden, ceased at the end of October 2006, and their service to Bergen and Stavanger, Norway was terminated in late 2008. The company cited high fuel prices and new competition from low-cost air services as the cause. However, Ambassador and Fred. Olsen Cruise Lines both operate cruises calling at the Ferry Terminal.

== Religious sites ==
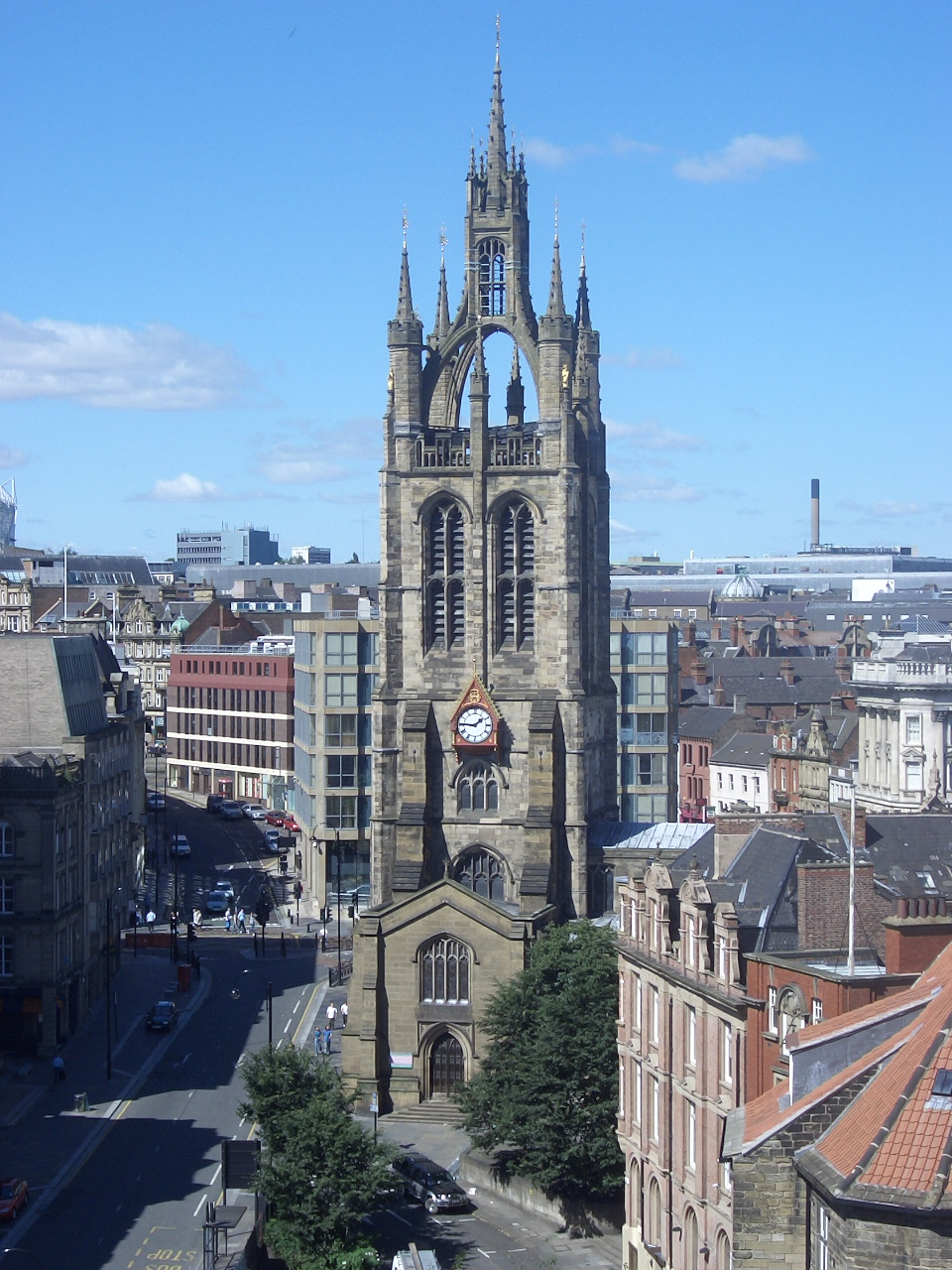
St Nicholas' Cathedral, as seen from the Castle Keep

Newcastle has three cathedrals, the Anglican St Nicholas', with its elegant lantern tower of 1474, the Roman Catholic St Mary's designed by Augustus Welby Pugin and the Coptic Orthodox Cathedral in Fenham. All three cathedrals began their lives as parish churches. St Mary's became a cathedral in 1850 and St Nicholas' in 1882. Another prominent church in the city centre is the Church of St Thomas the Martyr which is unique as the only Church of England church without a parish and which is not a peculiar.

One of the largest evangelical Anglican churches in the UK is Jesmond Parish Church, situated a little to the north of the city centre.

Newcastle is home to the only Baháʼí Centre in North East England; the centre has served the local Baháʼí community for over 25 years and is located close to the Civic Centre in Jesmond.

The city was a prominent centre of the Plymouth Brethren movement up to the 1950s and some small congregations still function. Among these are at the Hall, Denmark Street and Gospel Hall, St Lawrence.

The Parish Church of St Andrew is traditionally recognised as 'the oldest church in this town'.

The present building was begun in the 12th Century and the last addition to it, apart from the vestries, was the main porch in 1726. It is quite possible that there was an earlier church here dating from Saxon times. This older church would have been one of several churches along the River Tyne dedicated to St Andrew, including the Priory church at Hexham. The building contains more old stonework than any other church in Newcastle. It is surrounded by the last of the ancient churchyards to retain its original character. Many key names associated with Newcastle's history worshipped and were buried here. The church tower received a battering during the Siege of Newcastle by the Scots who finally breached the Town Wall and forced surrender. Three of the cannonballs remain on site as testament to the siege.

== Culture ==
=== Geordies ===
==== Nickname ====
The regional nickname for people from Newcastle and the surrounding area is Geordie. The Latin term Novocastrian can equally be applied to residents of any place called Newcastle, although it is most commonly used for ex-pupils of the city's Royal Grammar School.

==== Dialect ====
The dialect of Newcastle is also referred to as Geordie. It contains a large amount of vocabulary and distinctive words and pronunciations not used in other parts of the United Kingdom. The Geordie dialect has much of its origins in the language spoken by the Anglo-Saxon populations who migrated to and conquered much of England after the end of Roman Imperial rule. This language was the forerunner of Modern English; while the dialects of other English regions have been heavily altered by the influences of other foreign languages, particularly Latin and Norman French, the dialect retains many elements of the old language. For example, the pronunciation of certain words: "dead", "cow", "house" and "strong" are pronounced "deed", "coo", "hoos" and "strang", which is how they were pronounced in the Anglo-Saxon language. Other Geordie words with Anglo-Saxon origins include: "larn" (from the Anglo-Saxon "laeran", meaning "teach"), "burn" ("stream") and "gan" ("go").

According to the British Library, "Locals insist there are significant differences between Geordie and several other local dialects, such as Pitmatic and Mackem. Pitmatic is the dialect of the former mining areas in County Durham and around Ashington to the north of Newcastle upon Tyne, while Mackem is used locally to refer to the dialect of the city of Sunderland and the surrounding urban area of Wearside".

"Bairn" and "hyem", meaning "child" and "home" respectively, are examples of Geordie words with origins in Scandinavia; barn and hjem are the corresponding modern Norwegian and Danish words. Some words used in the Geordie dialect are used elsewhere in the northern United Kingdom. The words "bonny" (meaning "pretty") and "stot" ("bounce") are used in Scots; "aye" ("yes") and "nowt" (IPA:/naʊt/, rhymes with out, "nothing") are used elsewhere in Northern England. Many words, however, appear to be used exclusively in Newcastle and the surrounding area, such as "canny" (a versatile word meaning "good", "nice" or "very"), "hacky" ("dirty"), "netty" ("toilet") and "hockle" ("spit").

=== Nightlife ===
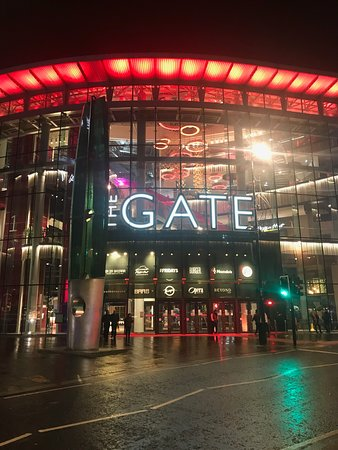
The Gate complex on Newgate Street is a nightlife destination.

In 2006, The Rough Guide to Britain placed Newcastle upon Tyne's nightlife as Great Britain's number one tourist attraction. In 2010, the Tripadvisor Travellers' Choice Destination Awards for Nightlife Destinations, Newcastle was awarded third place in Europe, behind London and Berlin. and seventh place in the world. In July 2023, Newcastle was voted the best city in the UK for food, fashion and nightlife.

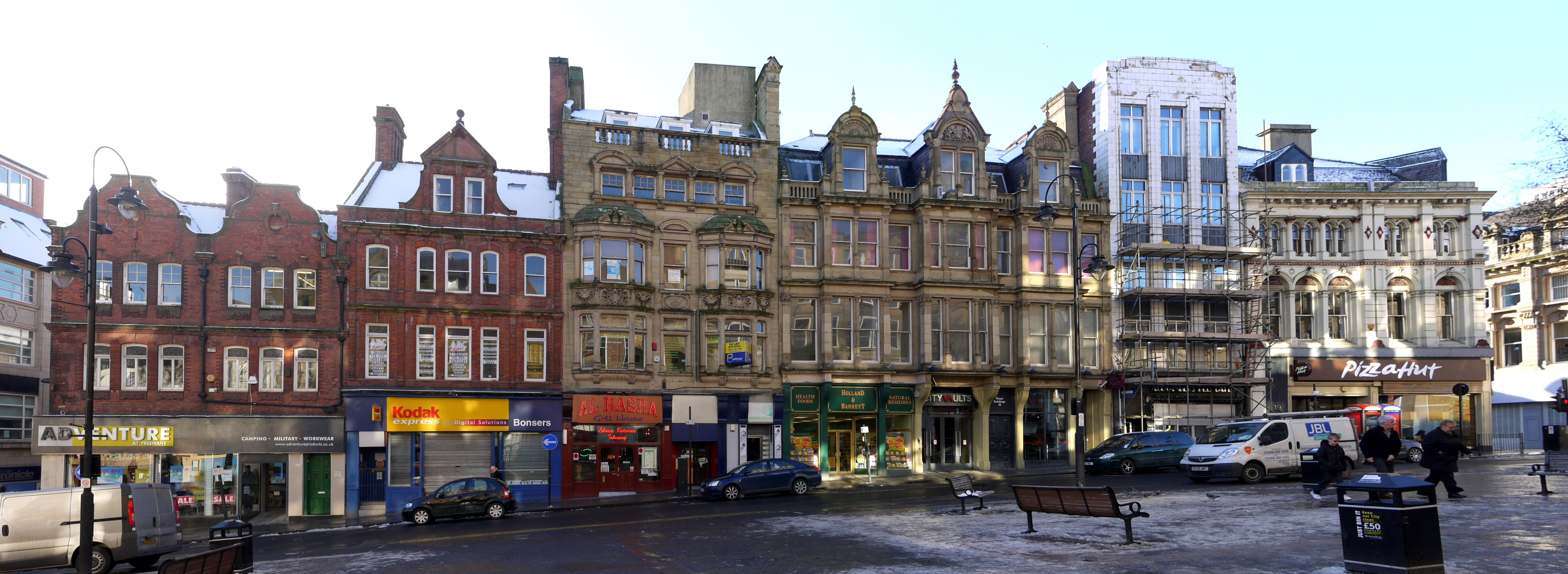
Bigg Market

There are many bars on the Bigg Market and its adjoining streets. Other areas popular for nightlife include Collingwood Street. (Note: Commonly referred to as the Diamond Strip, due to its concentration of high-end bars.) Neville Street, the Central Station area, Osborne Road in Jesmond and the wider Ouseburn area are home to a variety of younger metropolitan bars. The Gate, located on Newgate Street, has become a popular venue for late-night entertainment in the past decade and a half. Newcastle's 'pink triangle' is concentrated on Times Square, surrounded by the Centre for Life.

=== Food ===
Bakery chain Greggs was founded and is headquartered in Newcastle, which has the greatest number of its stores per capita in the country. Local delicacies include pease pudding and stottie cake.

In 1967, London-based Smith's Crisps created Salt & Vinegar flavour crisps which were first produced by their Newcastle based subsidiary Tudor Crisps and tested in Tudor's home market of north-east England before being launched nationally.

In 2010, Osborne Road in Jesmond was awarded fourth place in the UK Google Street View awards for the "foodie" category. Newcastle has its own Chinatown.

Additionally, the city has a wide variety of cuisines available including Greek, Mexican, Spanish, Indian, Italian, Persian, Japanese, Malaysian, French, American, Mongolian, Moroccan, Thai, Polish, Vietnamese and Lebanese. There has also been a noticeable growth in Newcastle's gourmet restaurant industry in recent years.

=== Theatre ===
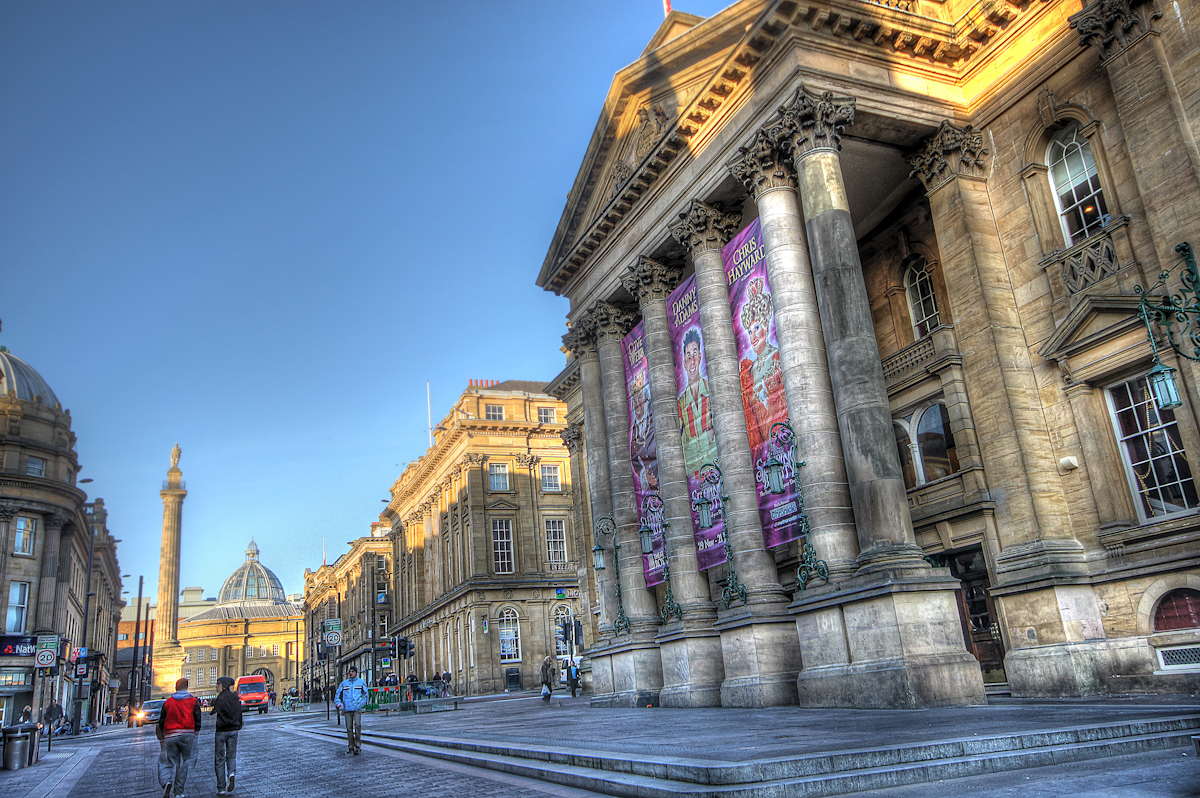
The Theatre Royal, on Grey Street

The city has a proud history of theatre. Stephen Kemble of the well-known Kemble family managed the original Theatre Royal, Newcastle for 15 years (1791–1806). He brought members of his famous acting family such as Sarah Siddons and John Kemble out of London to Newcastle. Stephen Kemble guided the theatre through many celebrated seasons. The original Theatre Royal in Newcastle was opened on 21 January 1788 and was located on Mosley Street. It was demolished to make way for Grey Street, where its replacement was built.

The city still contains many theatres. The largest, the Theatre Royal on Grey Street, first opened in 1837, designed by John and Benjamin Green. It has hosted a season of performances from the Royal Shakespeare Company for over 25 years, as well as touring productions of West End musicals. The Tyne Theatre and Opera House hosts smaller touring productions, whilst other venues feature local talent. Northern Stage, formally known as the Newcastle Playhouse and Gulbenkian Studio, hosts various local, national and international productions in addition to those produced by the Northern Stage company. Other theatres in the city include the Live Theatre, the People's Theatre, Alphabetti Theatre, Gosforth Civic Theatre and the Jubilee Theatre. NewcastleGateshead was voted in 2006 as the arts capital of the UK in a survey conducted by the Artsworld TV channel.

=== Literature and libraries ===
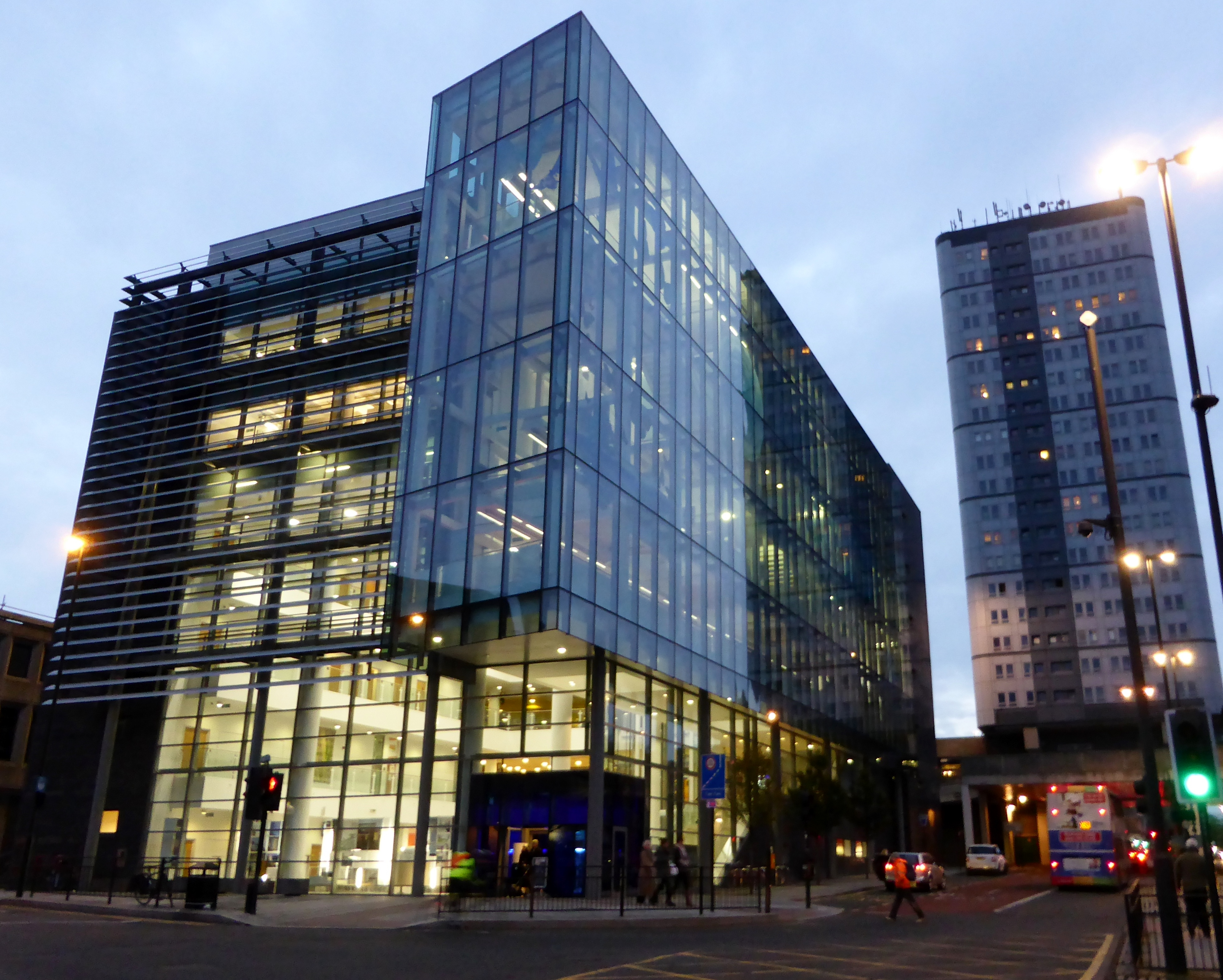
Newcastle City Library, on New Bridge Street West

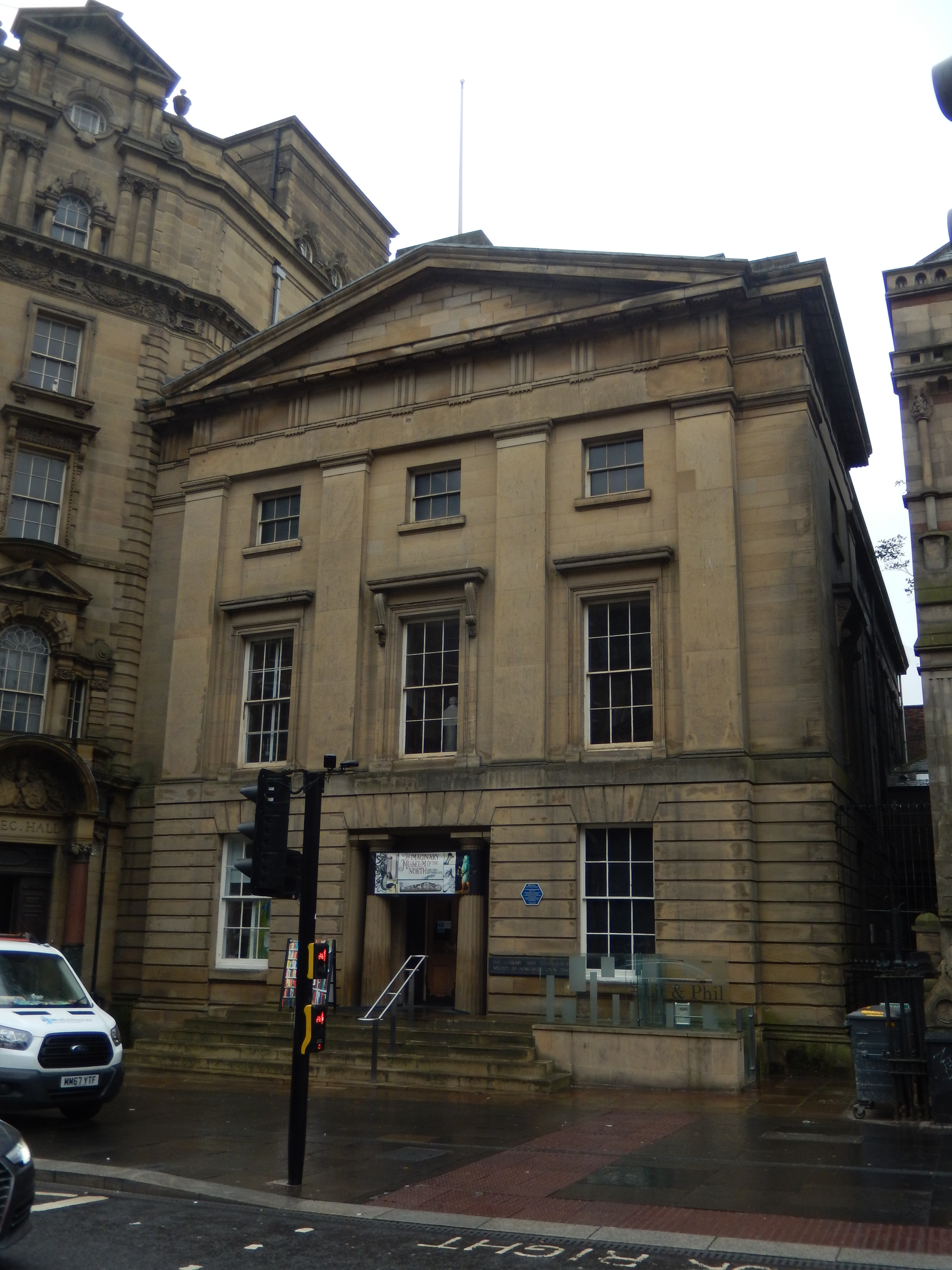
Literary and Philosophical Society of Newcastle upon Tyne

Newcastle has a strong reputation as a poetry centre. The Morden Tower, run by poet Tom Pickard, is a major venue for poetry readings in the North East, being the place where Basil Bunting gave the first reading of Briggflatts in 1965.

The Literary and Philosophical Society of Newcastle upon Tyne (popularly known as the 'Lit & Phil') is the largest independent library outside London, housing more than 150,000 books. Its music library contains 8,000 CDs and 10,000 LPs. The current Lit and Phil premises were built in 1825 and the building was designed by John and Benjamin Green. Operating since 1793 and founded as a 'conversation club,' its lecture theatre was the first public building to be lit by electric light, during a lecture by Joseph Swan on 20 October 1880.

The old City library, designed by Basil Spence, was demolished in 2006 and replaced. The new building opened on 21 June 2009 and was named after the 18th-century local composer Charles Avison; the building was first opened by Dr Herbert Loebl. In November 2009, it was officially opened by Queen Elizabeth II.

Seven Stories, the National Centre for Children's Books, opened in 2005 in the Ouseburn Valley.

=== Festivals and fairs ===
In either January or February, Chinatown becomes the focus point of celebrations for the Chinese New Year with carnivals and parades.

The Newcastle Science Festival, now called Newcastle ScienceFest, returns annually in early March.

The Newcastle Beer Festival, organised by CAMRA takes place in April each year. Evolution Festival, a music festival that attracted tens of thousands of attendees, took place in May from 2002 until 2013 and was described as "the biggest festival Tyneside has ever staged". The This Is Tomorrow festival now takes place over the spring bank holiday and is in the same location. The biennial AV Festival of international electronic art, featuring exhibitions, concerts, conferences and film screenings, is held in March. The North East Art Expo, a festival of art and design from the regions professional artists, is held in late May.

The Hoppings, the largest annual collection of travelling fairs in Europe, comes together on Newcastle Town Moor every June. The event has its origins in the Temperance Movement during the early 1880s and coincides with the annual race week at High Gosforth Park. Newcastle Community Green Festival, which claims to be the UK's biggest free community environmental festival, also takes place every June, in Leazes Park. The Cyclone Festival of Cycling takes place within, or starting from, Newcastle in June. The Northern Pride Festival and Parade is held in Leazes Park and in the city's Gay Community in mid July. The Ouseburn Festival, a family oriented weekend festival near the city centre, incorporating a "Family Fun Day" and "Carnival Day", is held in late July.

Newcastle Mela, held on the late August Bank Holiday weekend, is an annual two-day multicultural event that blends drama, music and food from Punjabi, Pakistani, Bengali and Hindu cultures. NewcastleGateshead also holds an annual International Arts Fair. The 2009 event was held in The Glasshouse Music and Arts Centre (then called Sage Gateshead), designed by Norman Foster. In October, there is the Design Event festival; this is an annual festival providing the public with an opportunity to see work by regional, national and international designers. The SAMA Festival, an East Asian cultural festival is also held in early October.

=== Music ===
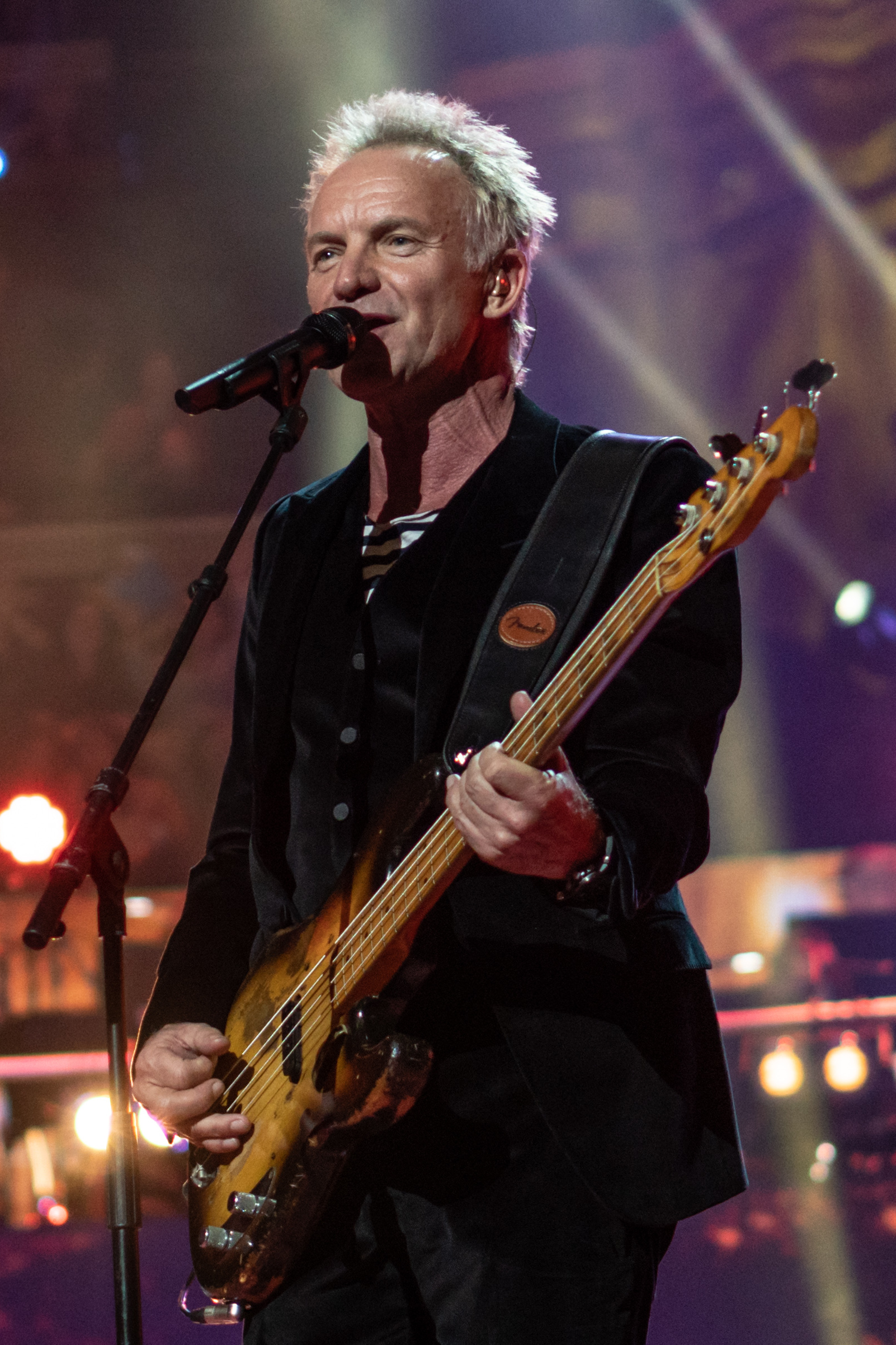
Sting, principal songwriter, lead singer and bassist for English rock band The Police

Newcastle's vernacular music was a mixture of Northumbrian folk music and 19th century songs with dialect lyrics, by writers such as George "Geordie" Ridley, whose songs include one which became an unofficial Tyneside national anthem, "Blaydon Races".

The 1960s saw the internationally successful rock group The Animals emerge from Newcastle night spots, such as Club A-Go-Go on Percy Street. Other well-known acts with connections to the city include Sting, Bryan Ferry, Dire Straits and more recently Maxïmo Park. There is also a thriving underground music scene that encompasses a variety of styles, including drum and bass, doom metal and post-rock.

Lindisfarne are a folk-rock group with a strong Tyneside connection. Their most famous song, "Fog on the Tyne" (1971), was rerecorded with footballer Paul Gascoigne in 1990. Venom, reckoned by many to be the originators of black metal and extremely influential to the extreme metal scene as a whole, formed in Newcastle in 1979. Folk metal band Skyclad, often regarded as the first folk metal band, also formed in Newcastle after the break-up of Martin Walkyier thrash metal band, Sabbat. Andy Taylor, former lead guitarist of Duran Duran was born here in 1961. Brian Johnson was a member of local rock band Geordie before becoming the lead vocalist for Australian band AC/DC.

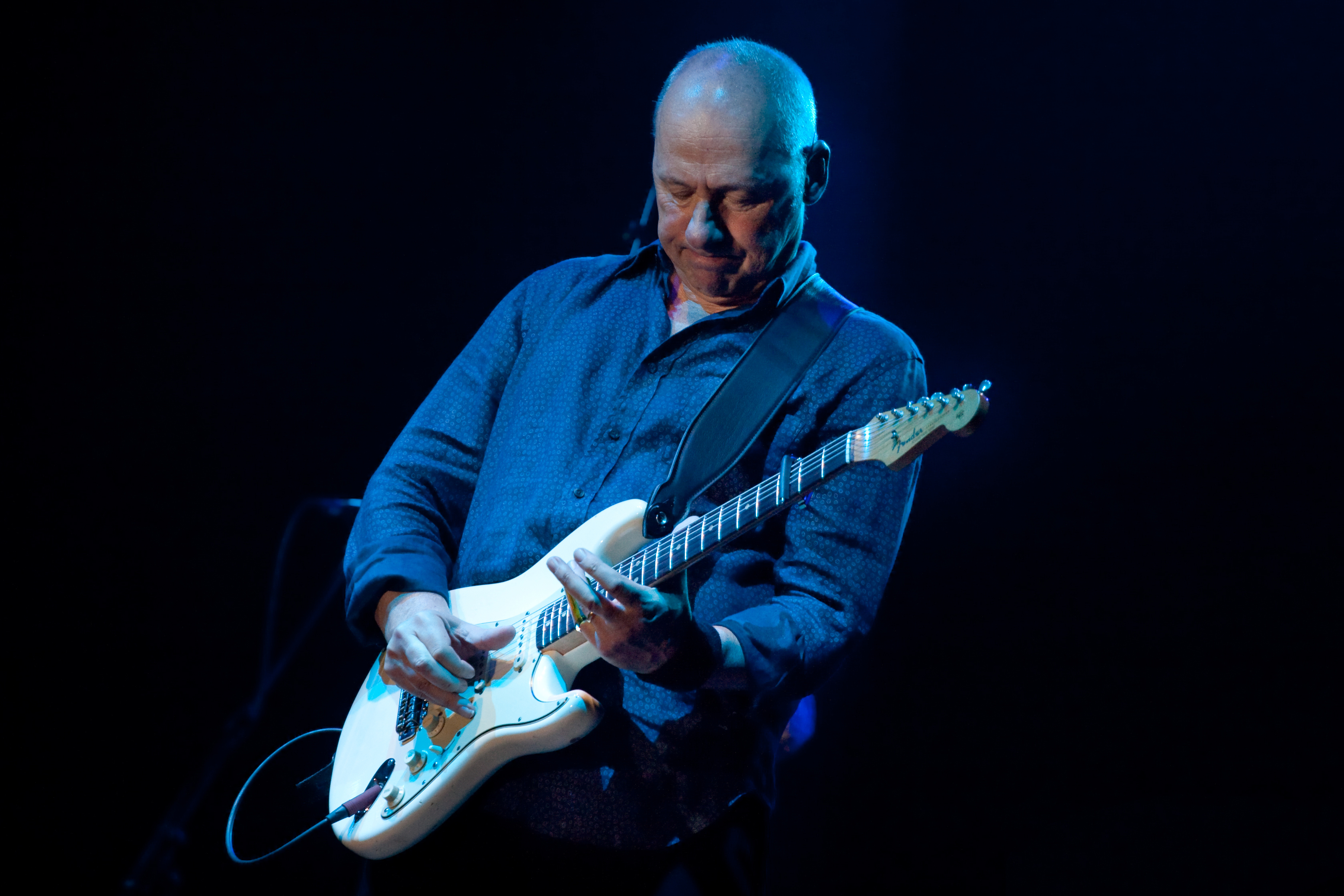
Dire Straits frontman Mark Knopfler. His song "Local Hero" is played at St. James Park before the start of every Newcastle United home game.

Newcastle is the home of Kitchenware Records (c. 1982), previously home to acclaimed bands such as Prefab Sprout, Martin Stephenson and the Daintees and The Fatima Mansions. The members of Lighthouse Family met at Newcastle University; the music video for their hit single "High" features the city's Tyne Bridge.

The 1990s boom in progressive house music saw the city's Global Underground record label publish mix CDs by the likes of Sasha, Paul Oakenfold, James Lavelle, and Danny Howells recording mix compilations. The label is still going strong today with offices in London and New York, and new releases from Deep Dish and Adam Freeland.

Newcastle's leading classical music ensemble is the Royal Northern Sinfonia, which was founded in 1958 and performed regularly at Newcastle City Hall until 2004. Nowadays, it is based at the Glasshouse International Centre for Music in Gateshead.

ICMuS, Newcastle University's music department, has been a driving force for music in the region, producing innovative work, organising concerts and festivals, instigating the first degree programme in folk music in the British Isles, and engaging creatively with communities in the region.

=== Concert venues ===
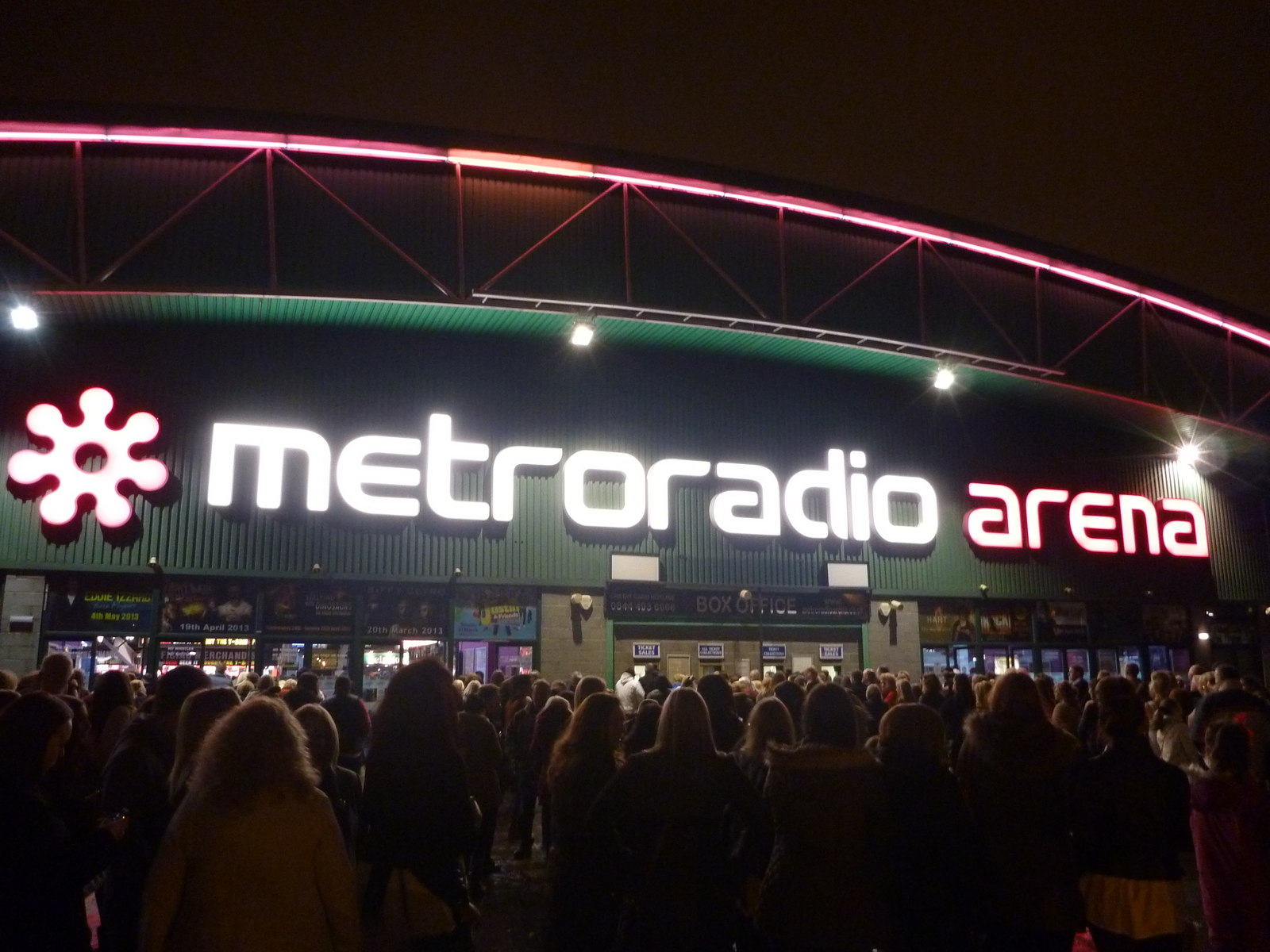
Metro Radio Arena

The largest venue used for music concerts is St James' Park, home of Newcastle United, which has also previously been used for rugby league games and the Olympic Games. The second-largest music venue in Newcastle is the 11,000-seat Utilita Arena Newcastle, which opened in 1995 and hosts major pop and rock concerts.

Newcastle City Hall is one of the oldest venues in the region and "attracts big names who are often legends of the past". Both of the city's universities have venues that mainly host indie and alternative bands.

On 14 October 2005, the 2,000 capacity NX Newcastle opened. It had previously been a music venue in the 1960s, hosting concerts by The Beatles and The Who. The new venue was headlined by The Futureheads on the opening night and known as the Carling Academy for a number of years, then as the O2 Academy. Since opening the venue has hosted performances by major bands and solo musicians including Adele, Arctic Monkeys, Katy Perry, The Libertines, Blondie and Amy Winehouse.

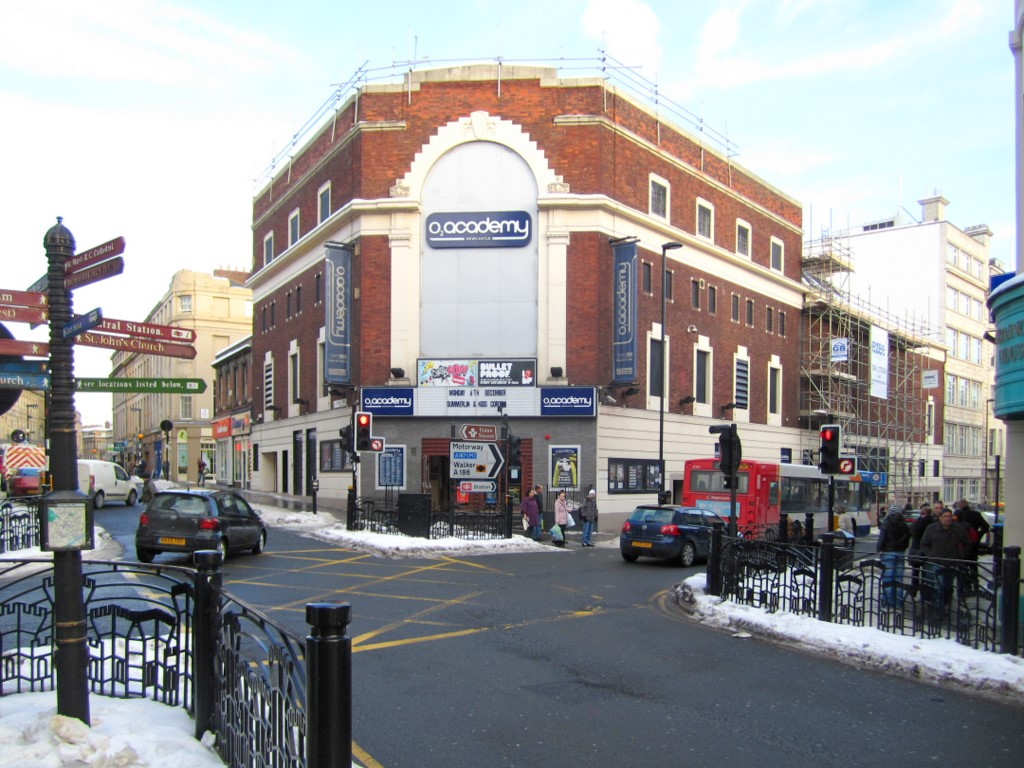
NX Newcastle, then called O2 Academy Newcastle

The Riverside music venue on Melbourne Street, open from 1985 until 1999, notably hosted Nirvana's first European show in 1989. The venue also welcomed Oasis, Red Hot Chili Peppers, David Bowie and The Stone Roses and was named Best Regional Venue by NME in 1993. Riverside has also been the subject of a book, Riverside: Newcastle's Legendary Alternative Music Venue.

In 2016, open-air concerts took place at Times Square for the first time, including performances from Maxïmo Park, Ocean Colour Scene and Catfish and the Bottlemen.

The small music venue Think Tank? was a nominee for Best Small Venue in NME in 2015. The Cluny in Ouseburn Valley is "one of the most important venues for breaking bands in the region". Trillians Rock Bar is well-noted for its rock and metal shows, and The Head of Steam is a 90-capacity basement venue described as "one of Newcastle's staple venues".

The Boiler Shop, situated in the former locomotive works of Robert Stephenson and Company, opened as a 1,000 capacity venue in 2017 and mostly hosts rock and dance shows.

=== Independent cinema ===
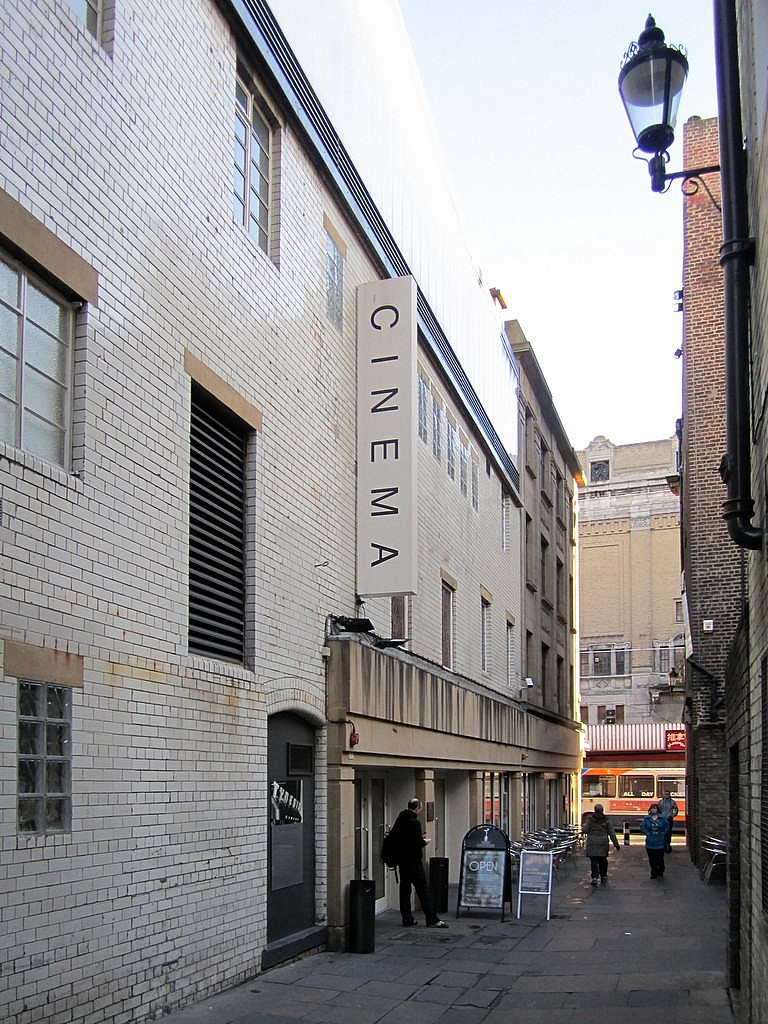
Tyneside Cinema, designed and built by Dixon Scott, great uncle of Ridley and Tony Scott

Newcastle has multiple independent cinemas, including the famous Tyneside Cinema, located on Pilgrim Street. It originally opened as the 'Bijou News-Reel Cinema' in 1937; it was designed and built by Dixon Scott, great-uncle of film directors Ridley Scott and Tony Scott. The Pilgrim Street building was refurbished between November 2006 and May 2008; during the refurbishment works, the cinema relocated to the Old Town Hall, Gateshead. In May 2008, the Tyneside Cinema reopened in the restored and refurbished original building. The site currently houses three cinemas, including the restored Classic the United Kingdom's last surviving news cinema still in full-time operation, with two new screens and dedicated education and teaching suites.

The city is home to The Side Cinema and Star and Shadow Cinema, which are both small venues that have built up cult audiences of film fans.

=== Landmarks ===
Its landmarks include the Tyne Bridge; the Swing Bridge; the castle; the cathedral, St Mary's Cathedral, St Thomas' Church; Grainger Town, including Grey's Monument and the Theatre Royal; the Millennium Bridge; St James' Park; Chinatown; and Fernwood House.

== Media ==
=== TV and film ===
The earliest known film featuring some exterior scenes filmed in the city is On the Night of the Fire (1939), though by-and-large the action is studio-bound. Later came The Clouded Yellow (1951) and Payroll (1961), both of which feature more extensive scenes filmed in the city. The gangster thriller Get Carter (1971) was shot on location in and around Newcastle and offers an opportunity to see what Newcastle looked like in the early 1970s. The city was also backdrop to another gangster film, the film noir Stormy Monday (1988), directed by Mike Figgis and starring Tommy Lee Jones, Melanie Griffith, Sting and Sean Bean. As well as this, Newcastle was used as the location for I, Daniel Blake (2016) which won the Palme d'Or award at Cannes Film Festival as well as the BAFTA for Outstanding British Film.

The city has been the setting for films based around football; films such as Purely Belter (2000), The One and Only (2002) and Goal! have all been focused around Tyneside. The comedy School for Seduction (2004), starring Kelly Brook, was also filmed in Newcastle.

The Bollywood film Hum Tum Aur Ghost (2010) was shot on location in Newcastle's city centre and features key scenes in and around Grainger Town. The film Public Sex (2009) was shot in and around Newcastle, and features several scenes under and around the Tyne Bridge.

Crime drama Harrigan (2013) was filmed in the city as well as Gateshead and Teesside.

=== Print media ===
Local newspapers that are printed in Newcastle include The Journal, Evening Chronicle, Sunday Sun and a regional version of Metro; all are published by Reach.

The Crack is a monthly style and listings magazine similar to London's Time Out.

The adult comic Viz originated in Jesmond and includes many references to Newcastle; The Mag is a fanzine for Newcastle United supporters.

=== Television ===
BBC North East and Cumbria is based to the north of the city on Barrack Road, Spital Tongues, in a building known as the Pink Palace. It is from here that the Corporation broadcasts Look North television regional news programmes.

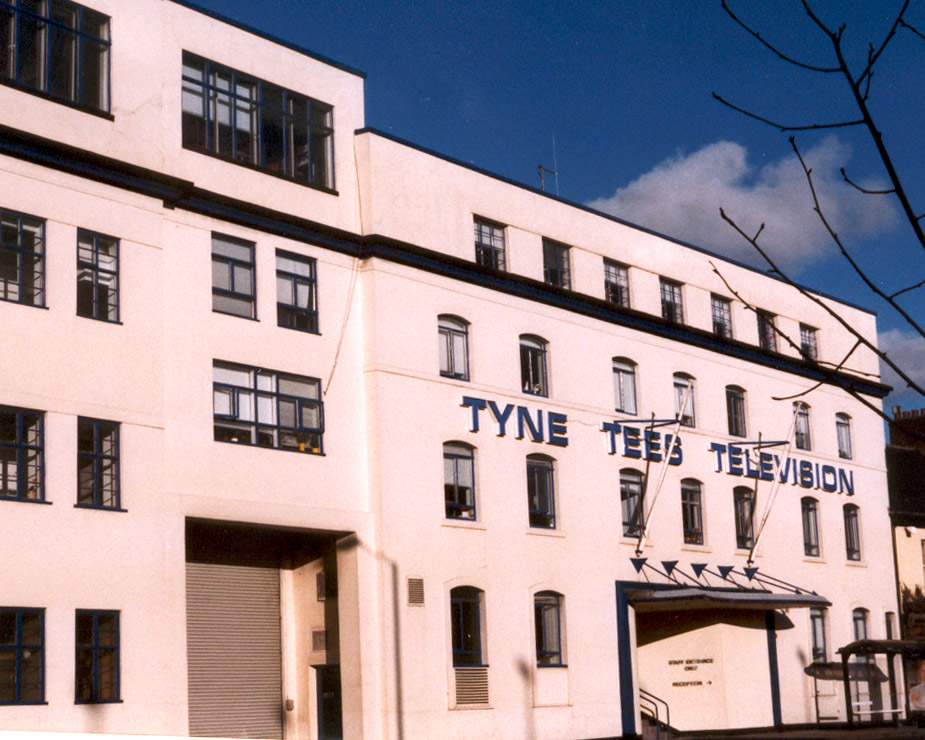
Two converted warehouses provided the base for Tyne Tees on City Road until 2005.

ITV Tyne Tees was based at City Road for over 40 years after its launch in January 1959. In 2005, it moved to a new facility on The Watermark business park next to the MetroCentre in Gateshead. The entrance to studio 5 at the City Road complex gave its name to the 1980s music television programme, The Tube.

=== Radio ===
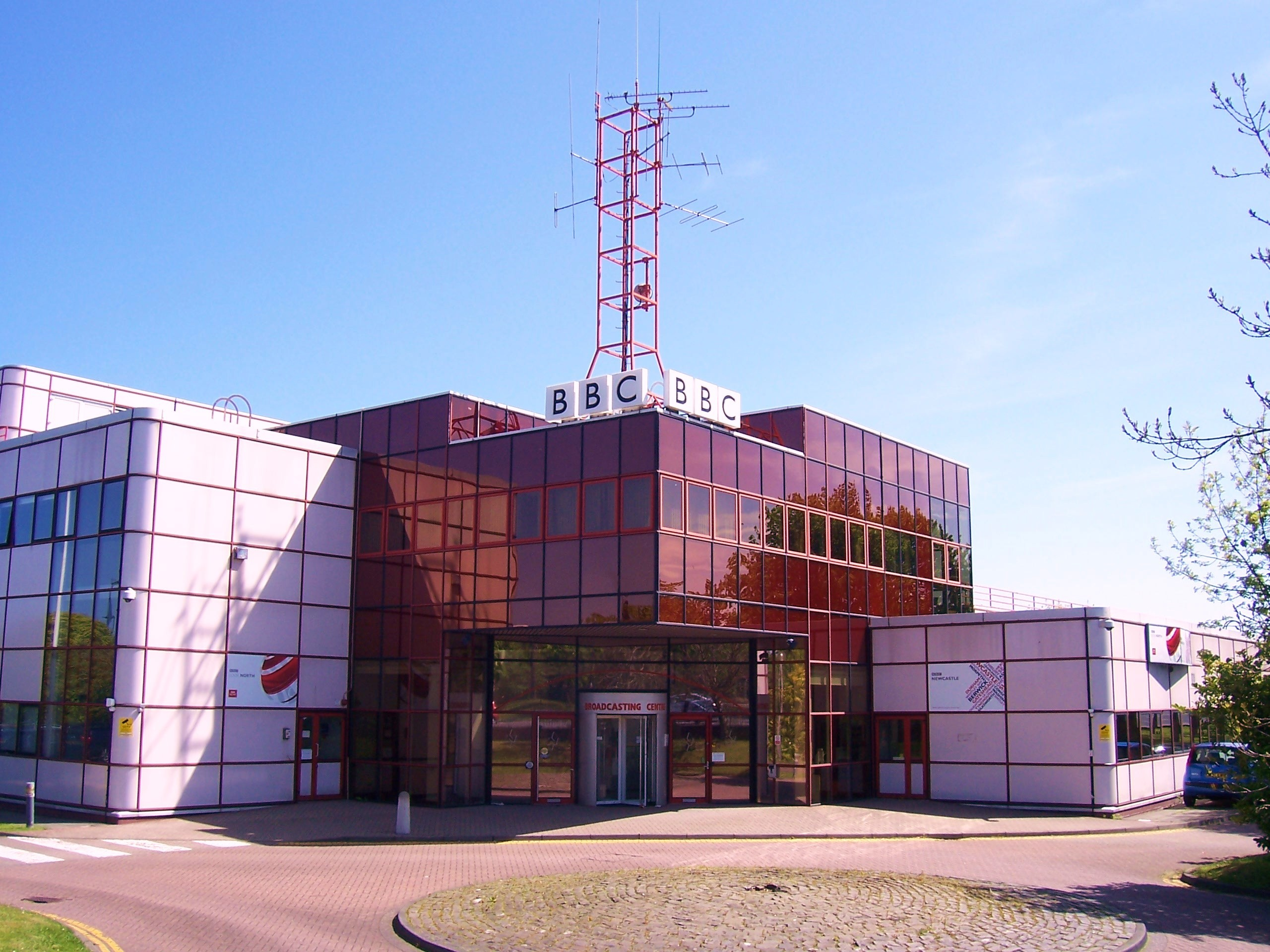
BBC Newcastle

Local radio station, BBC Radio Newcastle, broadcasts from the city.

Independent Local Radio stations include Hits Radio North East, Greatest Hits Radio North East, Capital North East, Heart North East and Smooth North East broadcast from the city, although programmes on these stations are networked from London or Manchester,; only news bulletins are produced locally.

Newcastle Student Radio is run by students from both of the city's universities during term time. Radio Tyneside has been the voluntary hospital radio service for most hospitals across Newcastle and Gateshead since 1951. The city also has a Radio Lollipop station based at the Great North Children's Hospital located within Newcastle's Royal Victoria Infirmary.

=== City-centre wi-fi ===
Newcastle was one of the first cities in the UK to have its centre covered by free wireless internet access. It was developed and installed at the end of 2006, going live in March 2007.

== Sport ==
=== Football ===
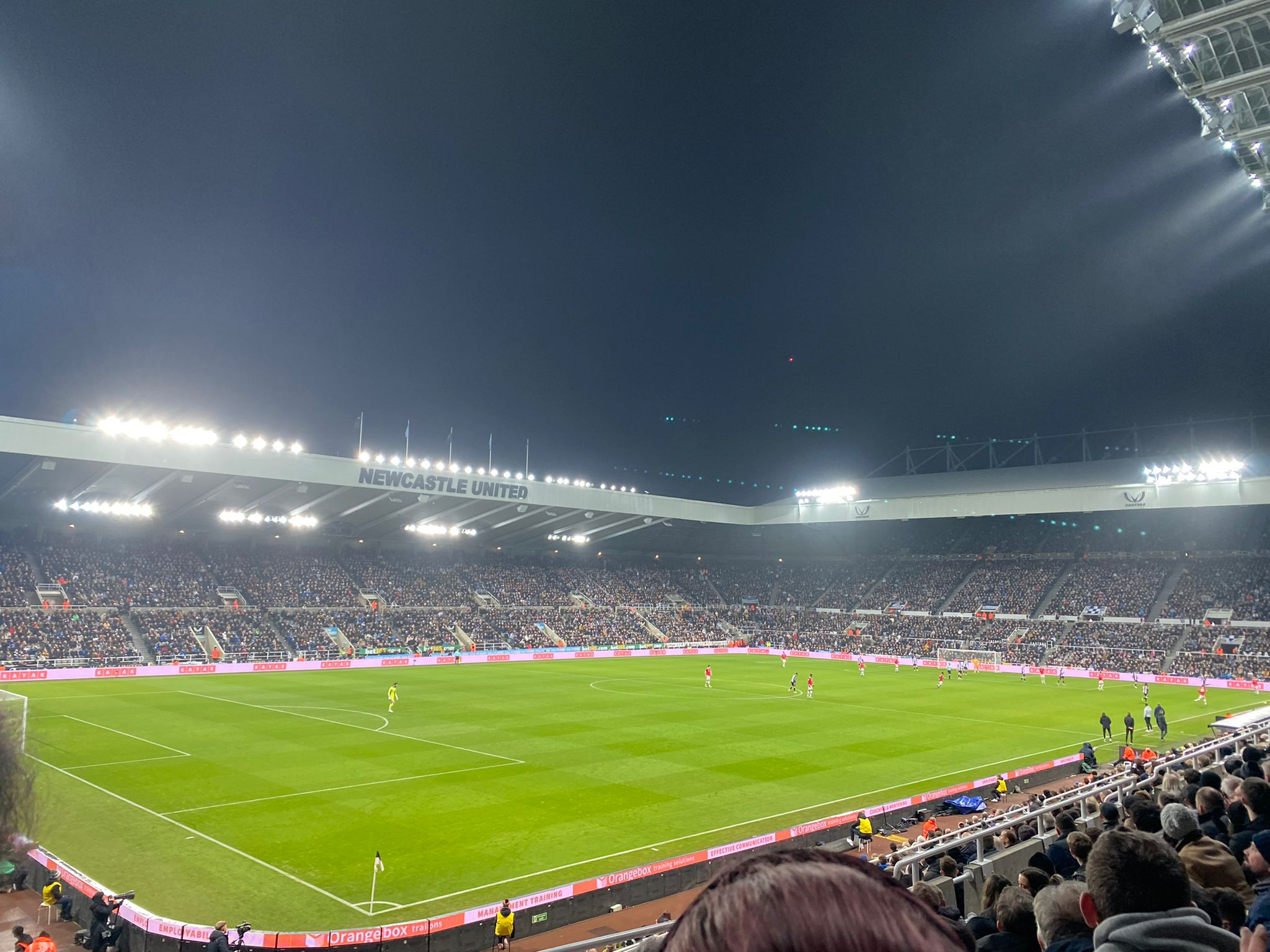
St James' Park during a match between Newcastle United and Manchester United

The Premier League football club, Newcastle United, has been based at St James' Park since it was established in 1892; any traces of the original structure are now long gone, as the stadium now holds more than 52,000 seated spectators, being England's seventh-largest football stadium. The city also has several non-League football clubs: Newcastle Blue Star, Newcastle Benfield, West Allotment Celtic, Team Northumbria and Heaton Stannington.

There is a women's football team, Newcastle United Women's Football Club, which was founded in 1989.

The 2012 London Olympic committee selected Newcastle as one of the UK host venue cities, with the stadium hosting nine matches in both the men's and women's football.

=== Athletics ===
Newcastle hosts the start of the annual Great North Run, the world's largest half-marathon in which participants race over the Tyne Bridge into Gateshead and then towards the finish line 13.1 miles (21.1 km) away on the coast at South Shields. Another athletic event is the 5.9-mile (9.5 km) Blaydon Race, a route from Newcastle to Blaydon, has taken place on 9 June annually since 1981 to commemorate the celebrated Blaydon Races horse racing.

=== Rugby union ===
The Newcastle Red Bulls are the only rugby union team in North East England to have played in the Premiership. They play at Kingston Park Stadium in the northern suburb of Kingston Park. 1996 Pilkington Shield winners Medicals RFC are also based in Newcastle.

Newcastle upon Tyne was one of the 11 host cities for the 2015 Rugby World Cup. St James' Park hosted three matches:

- South Africa v Scotland (3 October 2015)
- New Zealand v Tonga (9 October 2015)
- Samoa v Scotland (10 October 2015).

=== Rugby league ===
Newcastle Thunder (formerly Gateshead Thunder) are a professional rugby league club based in the city who now also play at Kingston Park Stadium. They currently play in the Kingstone Press League 1. Since 2015, the Super League Magic Weekend has been played annually in the city at St James' Park.

=== Cricket ===
There are a number of cricket clubs in the area including Newcastle Cricket Club, Newcastle City, South Northumberland, Blagdon Park, Benwell Hill, Benwell & Walbottle, Cowgate, Kirkley, Seaton Burn and United Stars.

=== Other sports ===
There are several hockey clubs in the city that compete in the Women's England Hockey League, the Yorkshire and North East Hockey League and the BUCS league. These include Newcastle Hockey Club, Newcastle Medics Hockey Club, Newcastle University Hockey Club and Northumbria University Hockey Club.

Newcastle has a horse racing course at Gosforth Park.

The city is home to the Newcastle Eagles professional basketball team who play their home games at the Vertu Motors Arena, having previously hosted their home games at Sport Central, a sports venue belonging to Northumbria University. The Eagles are the most successful team in the history of the British Basketball League (BBL).

The city's speedway team Newcastle Diamonds were based at Brough Park in Byker, a venue that is also home to greyhound racing.

The Newcastle Warriors were a professional ice hockey team that played the 1995–96 season in the British Hockey League. The Newcastle Vipers were also a professional ice hockey team in the British National League from 2002 and then the Elite Ice Hockey League between 2005 and 2011, when the team folded.

== Notable people ==
- Alfie Williams, child actor, born in the city.
- Charles Avison, the leading British composer of concertos in the 18th century, was born in Newcastle upon Tyne in 1709 and died there in 1770.
- Basil Hume, Archbishop of Westminster, was born in the city in 1923.
- Hawks family, a 19th century industrialist dynasty responsible for much development of the city.
- Vice Admiral Cuthbert Collingwood, 1st Baron Collingwood, was born in the city.
- Isaac Lowthian Bell, ironmaster, metallurgist and MP, was born in the city in 1816.
- Lord Armstrong, engineer and industrialist, was born in the city.
- George Stephenson, engineer and father of the modern steam railways, established his factory in the city.
- Robert Stephenson, also an engineer, lived in the city.
- Sir Charles Parsons, engineer and inventor of the steam turbine, established his factory in the city.
- Sir Joseph Swan, inventor of the incandescent light bulb, managed a business in the city.
- Rowan Atkinson, actor and comedian, studied at Newcastle University
- Sir Jonathan Ive, industrial designer, who studied at Newcastle Polytechnic
- Basil Bunting, modernist poet, worked at Newcastle Evening Chronicle.
- Peter Taylor, Lord Chief Justice, born in the city.
- Eça de Queiroz, Portuguese writer, was a diplomat in Newcastle from late 1874 until April 1879 - his most productive literary period.
- Abhisit Vejjajiva, former prime minister of Thailand, was born in the city.
- Agustín Fernández, composer, has been based in the city since 1995, teaching at Newcastle University and occasionally collaborating with Royal Northern Sinfonia.
- Cheryl Tweedy (formerly Cole) musician, born in the city.
- Eric Burdon, musician, born in the city.
- Sting, musician, attended St Cuthbert's Grammar School.
- Mark Knopfler, musician, attended Gosforth Grammar School.
- The Lighthouse Family, musicians, formed in the city.
- Jeffrey Dunn, musician, born in the city.
- Brian Johnson, musician, member of the band, Geordie, formed in the city.
- Alan Hull, musician, born in the city.
- Sakima, musician, born in the city.
- Neil Tennant, musician, attended St Cuthbert's Grammar School.
- Hank Marvin, musician, former pupil of Rutherford Grammar School.
- Bruce Welch, musician, former pupil of Rutherford Grammar School.
- Charlie Hunnam, actor, born in the city.
- James Scott, actor, born in the city.
- Ant McPartlin - entertainer and presenter born in the city
- Declan Donnelly - entertainer and presenter born in the city.
- Michael Carrick, footballer and manager.
- Alan Shearer, footballer, born in the city.
- David Scott Cowper, multiple circumnavigator, works in the city.
- Peter Higgs, Nobel Prize winning physicist, who researched the mass of subatomic particles, born in the city.
- Benjamin Satterley, wrestler, was born in the city.
- John Dunn, inventor of the keyed Northumbrian smallpipes, lived and worked in the city.
- Kathryn Tickell, the celebrated Northumbrian piper and composer, has longstanding associations with Newcastle as a resident, frequent performer at Sage Gateshead and lecturer at Newcastle University
- Freddy Shepherd, former chairman of Newcastle United F.C. for ten years, lived in Jesmond in Newcastle upon Tyne until his death in 2017.
- Tosan Evbuomwan, NBA basketball player.
- Sara Qaed, Bahraini political cartoonist who lives in the city.
- Andrew Cushin, Singer and songwriter, who was born in the city.
- Anne Reid, actress who was born in the city.

== International relations ==
=== Twin towns and sister cities ===
Newcastle upon Tyne is twinned with:

- Newcastle, Australia
- Atlanta, Georgia, U.S. (1977)
- Groningen, Netherlands
- Bergen, Norway (1968)
- Gelsenkirchen, Germany (1948)
- Haifa, Israel
- Nancy, France (1954).

The 1985 arrangement with Taiyuan, China, was unilaterally terminated by Newcastle upon Tyne in 2022.

=== Other agreements ===
Newcastle has a "friendship agreement" with the American city of Little Rock, Arkansas. Since 2003, it has had a "special cooperation agreement" with the Swedish city of Malmö. Furthermore, Newcastle participated in the 1998 summit of worldwide cities named Newcastle, which led to friendship agreements with the following places:

- Neuburg an der Donau, Germany
- Neuchâtel, Switzerland
- Neufchâteau, Vosges, France
- New Castle, Delaware, United States
- New Castle, Indiana, United States
- New Castle, Pennsylvania, United States
- Newcastle-under-Lyme, England
- Newcastle, KwaZulu-Natal, South Africa
- Shinshiro, Japan.

=== Foreign consulates ===
The following countries have consular representation in Newcastle: Denmark, Finland, Romania, Belgium, France, Germany, Iceland, Italy, Norway and Sweden.

== See also ==
- List of tallest buildings and structures in Newcastle upon Tyne
- List of public art in Newcastle upon Tyne
- List of Freemen of the City of Newcastle upon Tyne
- Duke of Newcastle
- Timeline of Newcastle upon Tyne
