= Alastair Balls =

British economist and civil servant

Alastair Gordon Balls CB, DL (born 18 March 1944) is a former senior economic adviser to the UK HM Treasury and director, Northern Region, Departments of Environment and Transport, and is Chairman of the International Centre for Life.

== Education and Whitehall career ==
Balls was born on 18 March 1944 and educated at Hamilton Academy in Hamilton, South Lanarkshire, Scotland, from which he went on to read economics at the University of St Andrews and the University of Manchester. From 1966 to 1973 he worked as an economist in the post of assistant Secretary to the Treasury of the Government of Tanzania; thereafter as an economist with the UK Government's Department of Transport, 1969–73. Alastair Balls served as secretary to the UK government's Channel Tunnel advisory committee of experts (the Cairncross Committee of 1974–75) chaired by another Scottish economist Sir Alexander Cairncross, also a former pupil of Hamilton Academy. In further Whitehall appointments, in 1976 Balls was appointed Senior Economic Advisor to HM Treasury; in 1979 appointed assistant Secretary at the UK's Department of Environment; and in 1983 promoted to under-Secretary and director, Northern Region of the Transport and Environment departments, regional development programmes being among his responsibilities, and an interest that was to be developed in subsequent appointments.

== Later career and appointments ==
In 1987, Alastair Balls took up the appointment as Chief executive of the newly established Tyne and Wear Development Corporation, a post he was to hold until the corporation was dissolved in 1998. Serving (from 1998 to 2003) as a member of the board of the Independent Television Commission, and as vice-chairman of the Council of the University of Newcastle-upon-Tyne, Alastair Balls had also been appointed (2002) a non-executive director of Northumbrian Water. This was followed by his appointment as chairman (2004–07) of the NewcastleGateshead Initiative.

In January 2006, Alastair Balls took up the post as Chairman of the Northern Rock Foundation and in December of that year was also appointed to the board of the Higher Education Funding Council for England. In 2007, Alastair Balls became Chairman of the Alzheimer's Society. He is also a Deputy Lieutenant of Tyne and Wear.

=== The International Centre for Life, Newcastle-upon-Tyne, England ===
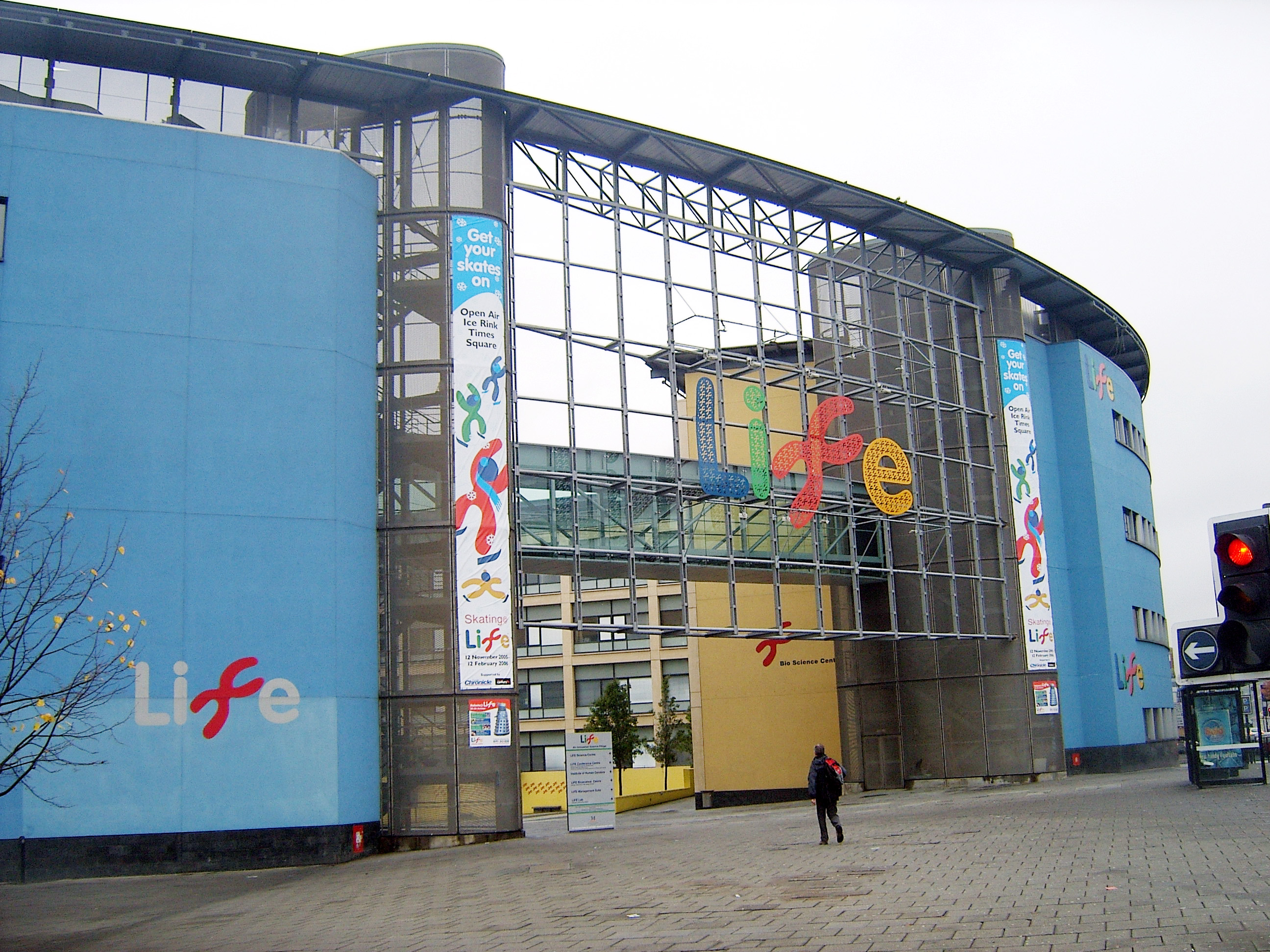
International Centre for Life building, Newcastle upon Tyne

In 1997, Alastair Balls was appointed Chief executive of the founding organisation of the International Centre for Life, the £70 million independent experimental science village, developed in conjunction with Newcastle University and University of Durham, majoring in genetics and life sciences that has been in the forefront of developments in embryonic human stem cell cultivation and transfer. In 2007 Alastair Balls stood down as chief executive of the Centre for Life, to become chairman of its board of trustees.

== Awards and honours ==
In the New Year Honours of 1994, Alastair Balls was appointed a Companion of the Order of the Bath (CB) for "services to regeneration in the north east of England."
