= Newcastle ScienceFest =

Cultural festival in Newcastle and Gateshead, England

Newcastle ScienceFest is a 10-day event at venues across NewcastleGateshead, with the principal aim of increasing the North East's enthusiasm for science and encouraging young people to consider a career in this area.

== Early history ==
The first Science Festival programme in the city ran from 2002 – 2007. In 2008, funding from One NorthEast was awarded for an additional three festivals (2009–2011). The festival is delivered in partnership with Centre for Life, Tyne and Wear Museums, Newcastle Science City, Newcastle University, Newcastle City Council and culture10 as part of NewcastleGateshead’s world-class programme of festivals and events.

== Relaunch ==
In 2009, the festival was re-launched with a new brand identity and website. There were three key strands of the programme catering for three different audiences; families, adults and schools. It included two family weekend events (7/8 & 14/15 March) and a series of adult events (lectures/science fiction/performances) during the week, as well as activities specifically for schools. The highlight of the week was the first Maker Faire event in the UK, which was held at the Centre for Life and Discovery Museum on the 14 and 15 March.

Although there was no overarching theme for 2009, some events integrated with the national agenda. For example, to celebrate Charles Darwin's 200th birthday, the festival commissioned the Darwin Brewery in Sunderland to develop a commemorative beer called Natural Selection which was available throughout March.

In 2010, ScienceFest saw the return of Maker Faire – an event for DIY technology and craft, ScienceFest After Dark – a series of late night, adult only events and events specially focussed on developing science literacy skills.

Headline makers included the world’s fastest Rubik’s cube solving robot, Power Tool Drag Racing and the UK’s most advanced musical tesla coil.

Newcastle Science Festival 2010 was attended by 51,000 people, including families, adults and children, across 120 events at 23 locations over a 10-day period. This represents an increase from 2009 where 48,500 people attended the event over a similar 10-day period.
