= Ernest Vaux =

British businessman and military officer

Lieutenant-Colonel Ernest Vaux, CMG DSO VD DL (5 March 1865 – 21 November 1925) was a business man from County Durham and a distinguished officer in the Volunteer Force and Territorial Force during the Second Boer War and World War I.

== Background and early life ==
A member of the Vaux Breweries family, his grandfather Cuthbert Vaux (1779–1850) established the brewery in 1806. Vaux was born in Bishopwearmouth, the son of John Storey Vaux (1834–1881) and his wife, Harriet, née Douglas (1837–1901). He was educated at the Worcester College for the Blind Sons of Gentlemen and joined the part-time Durham Royal Garrison Artillery (Volunteers).

== Military career ==
=== Boer War ===
Vaux was a Major in the Durham RGA (V) when he volunteered for service with the Imperial Yeomanry during the Second Boer War. He was appointed Machine Gun Commander, with the temporary rank of Lieutenant in the Army from 3 February 1900, the day after he left Liverpool for South Africa on the SS Monteagle. He served in the 5th Battalion, where commanded the Maxim guns and took part in over 80 operations in the Transvaal, the Orange River Colony and the Cape Colony. He was mentioned in despatches 7 times, received the Queen's South Africa Medal with four clasps, and was appointed a Companion of the Distinguished Service Order (DSO) in November 1901. In 1903, he received the Volunteer Officers' Decoration.

The family brewery introduced Double Maxim brown ale in 1901 to celebrate the Durham detachment's return and the beer is still brewed in County Durham by the Double Maxim Beer Company.

=== World War I ===
Vaux commanded the 7th Battalion, Durham Light Infantry of the Territorial Force from 1911 to 1918, when he was invalided home on health grounds. The 7th DLI fought in many of the bloodiest battles of the Great War on the Western Front, and his long tenure of command was highly unusual for a pre-war Territorial officer. Vaux was an extremely popular commander. The 7th DLI was recruited in Sunderland and many of the men under his commanded he knew personally. The battalion sometimes referred to itself as 'Vaux's Own'. In his first letter from the front he wrote to his wife " so my dear this is our first night on the front line. It is now past midnight, I have seen the men and made sure they all have had a hot drink and dry socks.... I very much fear that this is a war such as we have never seen before".

He believed in leading by example and took part in many major actions. The 50th (Northumbrian) Division, of which 7th DLI formed part, was thrown straight into action at the Second Battle of Ypres as soon as it arrived in Belgium. British forces were fighting to stabilise the British line and the Northumbrian Division's units were thrown in piecemeal. On 26 April, Vaux was ordered to move up towards Gravenstafel. The battalion advanced across open fields in 'artillery formation' under heavy fire, watched by Vaux standing in the open with his shepherd's crook in his hand. They reached a position north of Zonnebeke, before being ordered to retire after dark. Unlike the rest of the brigade, 7th DLI's casualties in their first action had been light, though they suffered a trickle of other casualties before being relieved from the front line on 3 May.

On 21 May the battalion was sent back up to the line to learn the routine of trench holding; A and B Companies were attached to the Regulars of 3rd Battalion Royal Fusiliers in trenches that were knee-deep in mud. While the battalion was in the line, the Germans launched another serious attack (the Battle of Bellewaarde Ridge) on Whit Monday (24 May) preceded by a gas cloud and the front line was overrun. Vaux ordered his men to get out of the trench and stand up to avoid the low-hanging gas cloud, and gathered other men who were retiring from the front line, telling them, 'It's no use running. Come up here and sing a hymn'. They stood on the parapet and sang Abide with Me as the cloud passed by. The Fusiliers and Durhams repulsed the initial attack, but a neighbouring unit was driven back and the battalions' left flank was open. They were pushed back to the third line, just behind Railway Wood, before reinforcements (including C and D Companies of 7th DLI) arrived to help halt the enemy advance. The battalion lost 29 killed, 76 wounded or gassed, and 183 missing, mainly Prisoners of War (PoW) from the overrun front trench.

After the war, Captain Wade, who had served as a private in the battalion, painted the men standing up to avoid the gas at Bellewaarde and singing their hymn. The painting, entitled The Miracle of Ypres, is in the possession of the Vaux family.

According to his letters, and letters sent by the men under his command, although it was highly irregular, Vaux chose to lead the attack himself. "At 11.00am we were ordered over the top.... When I assembled the men for roll call at tea time (17.00) the count attested to the loss of 700 of my command" of which Vaux himself was one of only 3 surviving Officers. Despite this terrible event the 7th was reinforced and Vaux continued to command them.

The 7th DLI was converted into the divisional pioneer battalion on 16 November 1915. Although pioneers were still fighting infantry battalions, they received extra equipment (and pay) and were tasked with assisting the divisional Royal Engineers in constructing trenches and strongpoints, road-making etc. Vaux was instrumental in the battalion being chosen for this role, arguing that the various trades of the Sunderland shipbuilders among its ranks made it ideally suited.

Vaux commanded them in these duties through the Somme, Arras, Passchendaele and the great German March Offensive in 1918. In April 1918 he contracted dysentery and was invalided home. His letters, confirm that 'Chancellor' his favourite hunter and the horse he had brought with him from his home in Yorkshire to the battles field of France, as his companion and war horse travelled back with him after 4 years of War. Chancellor, lived out the rest of his day in the fields of Brettanby Manor.

Colonel Vaux was mentioned in despatches 6 times during World War I and was appointed a Companion of the Order of St Michael and St George in 1916 and an Officer of the Ordre du Mérite Agricole in 1919. He was recommended for the Victoria Cross VC in 1918. However dispatches were lost with his retirement and the award was not received. In 1922 he was appointed Honorary Colonel of the 7th Battalion DLI.

The Ordre du Mérite Agricole was awarded to him for his support of the farmers in France, 1914–1918 war. During the times that his battalion was not on active duty at the front. Colonel Vaux volunteered himself and his troops to help with the harvest and to give general assistance to the farmers. His work greatly help to feed the beleaguered people of France, and for this he was awarded one of France's highest honours.

== Scouting ==
Colonel Vaux was one of the first men to interest himself in the Boy Scout movement. In the early 1900s he started taking the sons of his brewery works and other Sunderland boys on camping weekends, to show them the countryside and awaken in them a love of nature. He was a close friend of Robert Baden-Powell, 1st Baron Baden-Powell, having met him in the South African War. On 22 February 1908 Lord Baden-Powell visited him in Sunderland. Together they formed the official Scout troop (The Vaux Own) in Sunderland which still operates today. There is good reason to believe that this was the first official Scout Group in the world.

== Business and family ==
Vaux owned and directed Vaux Breweries with his brother Cuthbert, for most of his life as well as being an active and popular member of the Sunderland community. He was a highly accomplished Landowner and farmer, a keen member of the Zetland Hunt, and the first president of the Wearside Football League 1892–1898.

In 1906, Vaux married Emily Eve Lellam Ord OBE (1876–1966), the eldest daughter of Henry Moon Ord, a shipowner of Sunderland; they had four children:

- Rose Lellam Ord Vaux (1907–1994)
- Emily Maguerita Ord Vaux (1909–1994) M: Oliver, Bertram Morogh-Ryan. Flying Officer (F) No. 41 Squadron RAF (KIA) 1939–1945
- Ernest Ord Vaux (1911–1936) Captain, died from a polo accident in Aden, while seconded from the 2nd Dragoon Guards (Queen's Bays) to the Somaliland Camel Corps.
- Peter Douglas Ord Vaux (1913–1980) Wing Commander, No. 608 Squadron RAF (The Kipper Squadron), 1939–1945

At a dinner party in 1925, Vaux choked on a rabbit bone. Medical help could not be received quickly enough, and his health was so severely affected that he was moved to a nursing home on Windsor Crescent, Newcastle-upon-Tyne for treatment. He died there in 1925, at the age of sixty, and is buried in St Cuthbert's churchyard in Barton, North Yorkshire, near his home, Brettanby Manor.

== External sources ==
- Anglo Boer War – Vaux, Ernest
- Obituary
