= Paul Nicholson (businessman) =

English industrialist (1938–2025)

Sir Paul Douglas Nicholson, KCVO, KStJ (7 March 1938 – 17 January 2025) was an English industrialist and was Lord Lieutenant of County Durham from 1997 to 2013.

== Early life and education ==
Nicholson was born in County Durham, England, to (Frank) Douglas Nicholson TD and Pauline Nicholson (née Lawson-Tancred). He was educated at Ludgrove School, Harrow School and Clare College, Cambridge.

Between Harrow and Cambridge, he was commissioned for National Service in The Coldstream Guards. Having completed his period of active service, he transferred to the Army Emergency Reserve of Officers on 8 October 1958 as a second lieutenant with seniority in that rank from 13 April 1957. He was promoted to lieutenant on 29 December 1958. He transferred to the Royal Armoured Corps, Territorial Army, on 23 November 1961 with the rank of lieutenant.

== Career ==
After qualifying as a chartered accountant, he joined Vaux Breweries in 1965 and, from 1976 until 1999, he was Chairman of the Vaux Group, one of the most successful companies in the North East of England.

He was Chairman of the Tyne and Wear Development Corporation throughout its existence (1987-1998) and also served as Chairman of the Northern Region of CBI (1977–1979), Chairman of the Brewers and Licensed Retailers Association, formerly the Brewers Society (1994–1996), and in 1995 he became the inaugural President of the Northeast Chamber of Commerce. He was Knighted in 1993 for 'Services to Industry and the Public in Northeast England'. He was appointed a Knight Commander of the Royal Victorian Order (KCVO) in 2011.

In his youth he was a prominent amateur rider twice winning the Liverpool Foxhunters steeplechase in 1963 and 1965. Later he was President of the Coaching Club (1990–1997).

In 1980 he was appointed High Sheriff of Durham and Lord Lieutenant in 1997. He published an autobiography entitled ‘Brewer at Bay’, published by The Memoir Club.

== Personal life and death ==
Nicholson was married to Sarah Bacon, daughter of Sir Edmund Bacon, 13th and 14th Baronet, the premier baronet in the United Kingdom. They have one daughter, Lucy (b. 1972).

Already a Knight Bachelor, Nicholson was appointed Knight Commander of the Royal Victorian Order (KCVO) in the 2011 Birthday Honours.

Nicholson died on 17 January 2025, at the age of 86.

== Honours and awards ==

Ribbon	Description	Notes
	Royal Victorian Order (KCVO)	Knight Commander; 11 June 2011
	Knight Bachelor (Kt)	1993
	Order of St. John (K.stJ)	Knight of Justice
	Queen Elizabeth II Coronation Medal	1953
	Queen Elizabeth II Golden Jubilee Medal	2002; UK Version of this Medal
	Queen Elizabeth II Diamond Jubilee Medal	2012; UK Version of this Medal
	Service Medal of the Order of St John	

Honorary titles
Preceded by David James Grant	Lord Lieutenant of Durham; 1997–2013	Succeeded by Susan Snowdon
