= Wards Brewing Company =

Brewery in Sheffield, England

Wards Brewing Company was a brewery based at Sheaf Brewery on Ecclesall Road, Sheffield, England, now a subsidiary of Double Maxim Beer Company. The most famous brand produced was Wards Best Bitter.

== History ==
=== Early years ===
In 1837, William Roper and John Kiby started a brewery and business on Effingham Street. Roper died in 1842, leaving John Kiby in sole control. He was joined by George Wright in 1860.

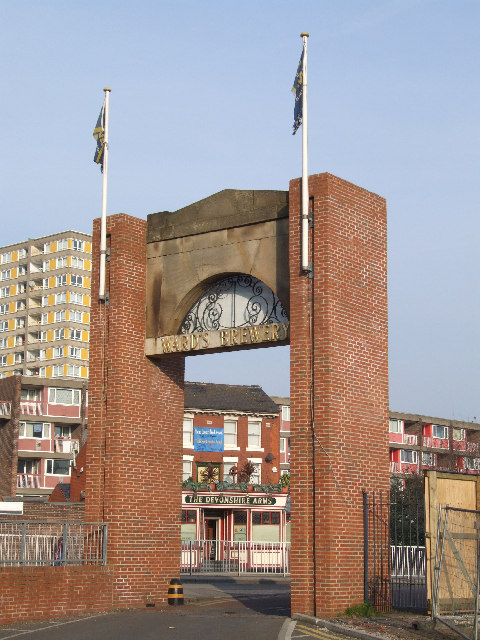
Wards brewery gates, 2006

=== S. H. Ward ===
Septimus Henry Ward joined the company in 1868 when it ran into financial trouble. Due to the substantial amount he had invested, the primary brand was renamed Wards Best Bitter. George Wright left the partnership a year later. The business continued to expand by buying up other breweries and associated public houses. In 1876, it bought the SOHO Brewery and made it its main premises, renaming it to Sheaf Brewery. It was made a limited company called S.H. Wards & Company Limited in 1896.

The company continued to expand in the twentieth century by acquiring and restoring pubs. This was halted by the onset of the Second World War due to a lack of raw materials. The brewery was hit by three incendiary bombs in 1940, which caused the death of four of its workers. Despite these setbacks, it recovered after the end of the war and continued restoring pubs.

=== Demise ===
In 1972, the company was acquired by Vaux & Associated Breweries and continued to brew bitter as a subsidiary. Despite still being profitable, the brewery was closed in 1999 as the Vaux company was broken up after an acrimonious takeover by financiers. Members of the Vaux founding family, the Nicholsons, attempted a management buyout of Wards but their offer was rejected.

On the final day of operation, an unofficial celebration to mark the years of dedicated work of the Wards staff was held. The much respected operations manager, and former head brewer Paul Simpson (also an RNR officer) was parodied by one of the brewing operatives who wore a homemade sailor suit. Also on this last day, several 'generations' of the brewery's excise officers, including Lorraine Baker and David Bates, bought everyone else a beer by installing a barrel in the brewer tap, The Devonshire, across the road from the brewery. The cremated remains of the last brewery cat, once to be found in the Sample/Training Room, were spirited away and now rest in the house of one of the former excise officers.

The land was sold to developers who demolished most of it to make way for luxury apartments. It was revealed later that the price achieved was several million pounds less than the buyout that would have saved this much-loved brewer.

=== Resurrection ===
The Wards brand was bought by the Double Maxim Beer Company in 2003 and is run as a subsidiary called Wards Brewing Company. After a successful launch of the bottled version (first brewed again by Robinson's of Stockport), and cask (originally re-brewed by Jennings of Cockermouth) all variants are now brewed by Maxim. The branding still states Wards Brewery Sheffield.

== Brands ==
- Wards Best Bitter (bottled 4.5% abv)
- Wards Best Bitter (cask 4% abv)
- Wards 1840 (4.5 abv)
