= Tyne and Wear Development Corporation =

Tyne & Wear Development Corporation
- Formation: 1987
- Dissolved: 1998
- Headquarters: Newcastle upon Tyne
- Chair: Sir Paul Nicholson
- Chief executive: Alastair Balls

The Tyne and Wear Development Corporation (TWDC) was established in 1987 to develop land on the banks of the River Tyne and the River Wear in England.

== History ==
The corporation was established as part of an initiative by the future Deputy Prime Minister, Michael Heseltine, in February 1987 during the Second Thatcher ministry. Board members were directly appointed by the minister and overrode local authority planning controls to spend government money on infrastructure. This was a controversial measure in Labour strongholds such as East London, Merseyside and North East England.

Its flagship developments included the regeneration of the East Quayside in Newcastle, Royal Quays in North Tyneside and St Peter's in Sunderland. During its lifetime 10,700,000 square feet (990,000 m^{2}) of non-housing development and 4,550 housing units were built. Around 33,707 new jobs were created and some £1,115m of private finance was leveraged in. Circa 1,287 acres (521 ha) of derelict land was reclaimed and 24 miles (39 km) of new road and footpaths put in place.

The Chairman was Sir Paul Nicholson and the Chief Executive was Alastair Balls. It was dissolved in 1998. The legacy of TWDC remains controversial within the region, in particular in Sunderland where it is believed the investment in services and leisure opportunities in Newcastle where the corporation was based was not matched in the rest of the region. The corporation also invested heavily in developing the Tyne and Wear Metro system although this was not extended to Sunderland until after the corporation was abolished.
