= Susan Snowdon =

English schoolteacher and magistrate (born 1951)

Dame Susan Snowdon DCVO CStJ JP
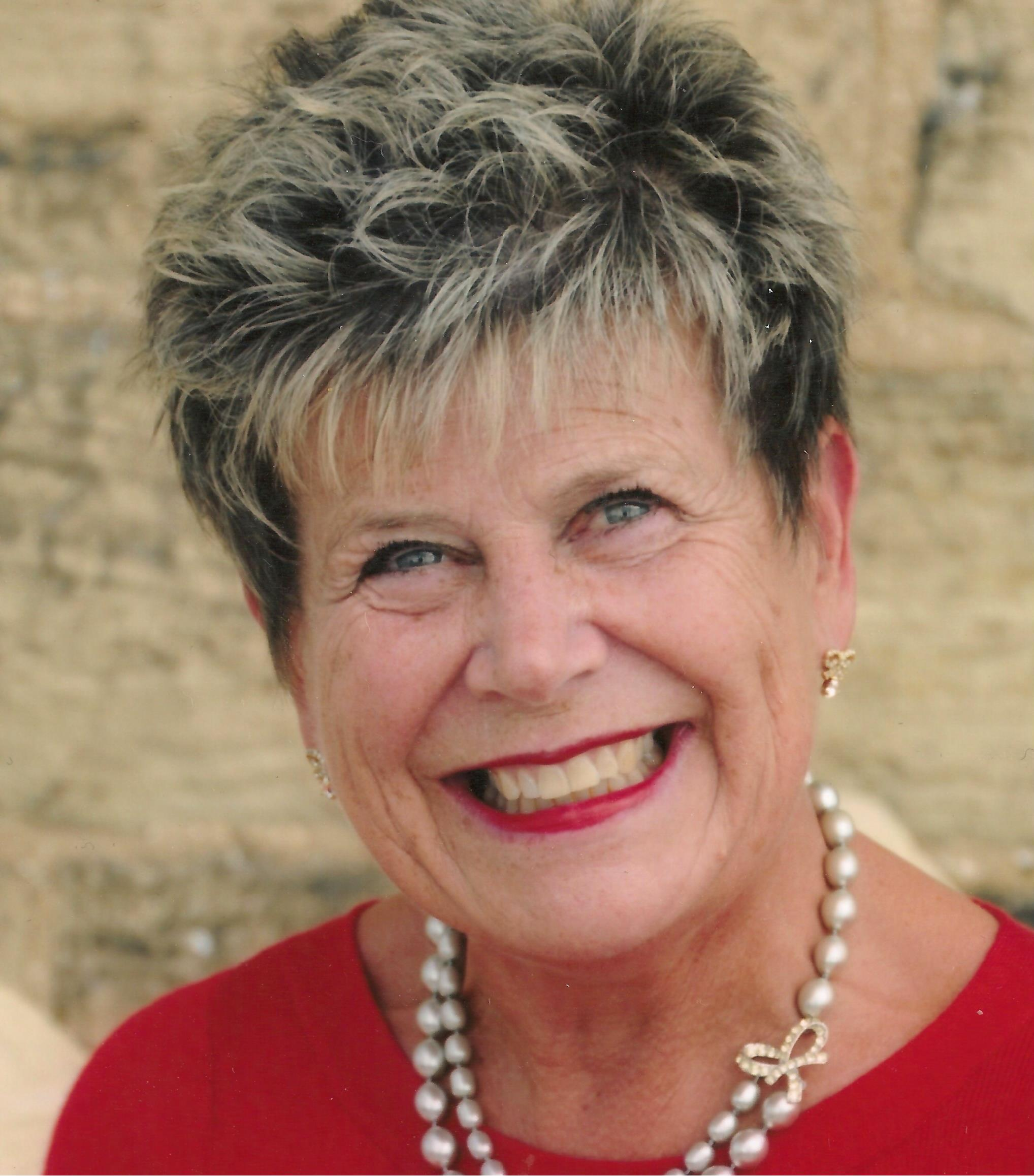
- Snowdon in 2022

Lord Lieutenant of Durham
- In office 8 March 2013 – 1 April 2026
- Monarchs: Elizabeth II; Charles III
- Preceded by: Sir Paul Nicholson
- Succeeded by: Michael Butterwick

Personal details
- Born: 1 April 1951 (age 75)
- Spouse: Keith Snowdon
- Profession: Teacher

Dame Susan Snowdon, DCVO (born 1 April 1951) is a former teacher and magistrate. She was the Lord Lieutenant of Durham from 2013 to 2026 and was the first woman to hold that post.

In 2026, Snowdon was appointed President of Point North, the community foundation for County Durham and Tees Valley.

== Career ==
Snowdon was born on 1 April 1951; her father was a shop-keeper. She was a primary school teacher in Chilton and Ferryhill, County Durham. In 1989, in order to advance her career and become a deputy head teacher, she underwent a medical. This showed that her aortic valve "had completely perished" and she required immediate surgery to prevent her death by Christmas of that year. The surgery, in which a metal valve was successfully fitted, saved her life. However, such a major health issue meant that she could no longer teach.

On 3 August 2006, she was commissioned a Deputy Lieutenant (DL) in the County of Durham. On 8 March 2013, she was appointed Lord Lieutenant of County Durham. She succeeded Sir Paul Nicholson to become the county's 30th Lord Lieutenant. Following the death of Queen Elizabeth II, she remained in her position but as the King’s representative in county Durham.

Snowdon was appointed a Dame Commander of the Royal Victorian Order (DCVO) in the 2025 Birthday Honours.

== Personal life ==
She is married to Keith Snowdon, a farmer.

Honorary titles
| Preceded by Paul Nicholson | Lord Lieutenant of Durham; 2013 – 2026 | Succeeded by Mike Butterwick, CBE |
