= Swallow Hotels =

Edinburgh-based hotel chain

Swallow Group plc
- Industry: Hospitality
- Predecessor: Vaux Group
- Defunct: 2014
- Headquarters: Edinburgh, Scotland
- Parent: Whitbread (2000-2003); London Inn Group (from 2003)

Swallow Hotels was an Edinburgh-based hotel chain with a portfolio of 18 hotels, operating in the three and four star sector.

== History ==
By the 1990s, the Vaux Group had expanded into hotels. The company changed its name to Swallow Group plc, concentrating on the hotels business and incorporating the former Vaux-managed pub estate under the Swallow Inns & Restaurants brand.

The Swallow Group was bought by Whitbread in January 2000. Whitbread sold the pubs to Enterprise Inns in May 2000.

The Swallow brand was subsequently purchased in 2003 by London Inn Group. The hotels traded under the name London & Edinburgh Inns Ltd and went into administration on 14 September 2006.

On 4 August 2009 the Stockton-on-Tees Swallow Hotel closed, as the administrators 'could not trade the hotel profitably'. Its last remaining hotel, in Glasgow, near Ibrox Stadium, was closed in 2014.
