= Maxim Brewery =

Brewing company in Houghton-le-Spring, England

- Type: Private
- Industry: Brewing
- Predecessor: Double Maxim Beer Company
- Founded: 1999; 27 years ago
- Founders: Doug Trotman, Mark Anderson, Jim Murray
- Headquarters: Houghton-le-Spring, United Kingdom
- Products: Beer
- Website: www.maximbrewery.co.uk

Maxim Brewery is a beer brewing company based in Houghton-le-Spring, United Kingdom. It was set up to rescue the famous Double Maxim beer, which had ceased production when the Vaux brewery was closed in 1999. In 2019 Maxim Brewery supported the making of a short film 'A passion for Vaux' celebrating Sunderland large but not forgotten brewery. In 2021, the new beers, Maverick and Medusa, were launched.

== History ==
The new company, Double Maxim Beer Company, was founded by ex-Vaux directors Doug Trotman, Mark Anderson and ex-Vaux head brewer, Jim Murray, and in 2000 re-launched Double Maxim. Brewing of the beer was initially contracted to Robinson's of Stockport.

In 2003, the company bought the brand and recipes of a former Vaux subsidiary, Wards, and relaunched Wards Best Bitter, again to be brewed and bottled by Robinson's. A cask version was later launched, initially brewed by Jennings of Cockermouth and latterly Robinson's. A second Vaux ale was resurrected in 2005 in the form of Samson, again sold in 500ml bottles. Its fourth beer, Maximus, was created for (and won) entry in the internationally acclaimed Tesco Beer Challenge, in 2005. All of its beers are sold in 500ml bottles in the United Kingdom.

The company achieved its aim of returning brewing to Sunderland in 2008, when the new Maxim Brewery was opened at Houghton-le-Spring. With the closure of Federation Brewery in 2010, the renamed Maxim Brewery was joined by 2 brewers ex Tyne Brewery. Maxim Brewery is now the biggest independent brewery in the North East of England. Along with the famous Double Maxim, Samson, Wards and Lambtons, the company also produces Swedish Blonde a 4.2% IPA style beer and Maximus a 6% strong Ale.

Maxim was first brewed in 1901 to celebrate the return of the Maxim Gun detachment from the Boer War. It was commanded by colonel Ernest Vaux and the North East style Brown Ale is one of the oldest surviving beers in the United Kingdom. In 1938, the strength of the original Maxim beer was increased, and it was renamed Double Maxim.
