= Centre for Life =

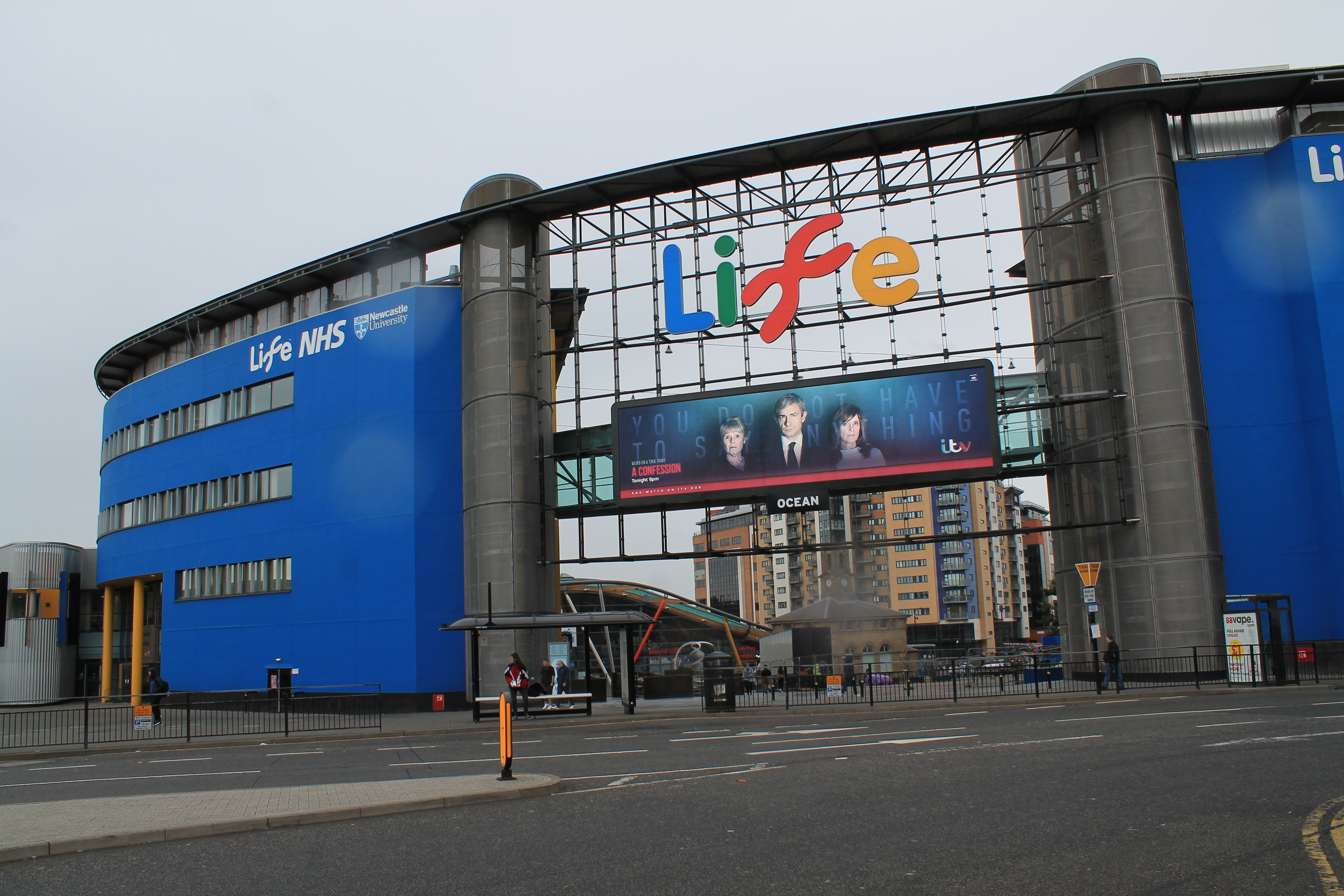
- The northern entrance to the Centre for Life and Times Square
- Established: 2000
- Location: Times Square, Newcastle upon Tyne, England, NE1 4EP
- Coordinates: 54.9675°N 1.6206°W
- Type: Science museum
- Visitors: 225,000 visitors per year (as of 2010)
- Public transit access: Railway, Bus, Metro
- Parking: Times Square Car Park
- Website: www.life.org.uk

The Centre for Life is a science village in Newcastle upon Tyne where scientists, clinicians, educationalists and business people work to promote the advancement of the life sciences. The centre is a registered charity, governed by a board of trustees, which receives no public funding.

== History ==
The centre was opened by the Queen in May 2000. In March 2009 the centre was the main venue for the UK's first Maker Faire, run as part of the Newcastle ScienceFest. The 2010 Newcastle Maker Faire was held at the Centre for Life and the nearby Discovery Museum. Maker Faire UK returned to the Centre for Life in 2013, at which over 300 hackers, crafters, coders, DIYers and inventors presented their projects alongside installations and drop-in workshops, and also in 2016.

== Life Science Centre ==
The Life Science Centre is a visitor attraction at the International Centre for Life. It has a changing programme of events made up of temporary and permanent exhibitions, a Science Theatre, a planetarium.

== Exhibitions and activities ==
The centre provides employment for some 600 people. Partners in the Centre for Life include the NHS and Newcastle University. The Experiment Zone allows visitors to try out laboratory-style experiments such as DNA extraction and the Brain Zone explores how the human brain works. The Wow Zone features several hands on activities, including a 'Big Machine' where guests can catapult plastic pellets up to a height of 6 metres, and a set of seats connected to pulley systems: requiring guests to pull on a wire to send them up a height.

Life Science Centre has hosted major touring exhibitions such as Body Worlds Vital in 2014. In the winter months, Times Square is host to an open-air ice rink.

=== Temporary exhibitions ===
- Body Worlds: Animal Inside Out - Part of Gunther von Hagens's Body Worlds series of exhibitions that includes a gorilla, an elephant, a giraffe, a camel, a caribou, a cheetah, a goat, a sheep standing on a sheepskin, a goat doe standing upright whilst being pregnant with twins, a bear standing upright on hind legs, a horse, a cow, a bull, a yak, a shark, a great white shark holding a seal in his mouth, and a lion pouncing on an oryx from behind, among others.

== Medical research ==
Newcastle Fertility Centre was established in 1991 at the RVI, later moving to the Centre for Life and officially opened by Professor Lord Robert Winston on 22 February 2000. As well as treating infertile couples, it carries out research and development into new fertility treatments.

Scientists based at The Centre for Life were the first people in Europe - and only the second in the world - to get a license for stem cell research on human embryos. The license will allow work on new treatments for conditions including diabetes, Alzheimer's disease and Parkinson's disease. In 2005 scientists based at the centre were the first to successfully clone a human embryo.

The NHS Northern Genetics Service is part of the Institute of Genetic Medicine. The main purpose of the Northern Genetics Service is to provide comprehensive and fully integrated clinical and laboratory services to the highest of standards that can help reduce the incidence of illnesses associated with genetic disease.
