= Vaux Breweries =

Brewer and hotel owner based in Sunderland, England

Vaux Brewery
- Type: Public
- Industry: Brewing
- Founded: 1806
- Defunct: 2000
- Fate: Acquired
- Successor: Whitbread, Vaux Brewery
- Headquarters: Sunderland, UK
- Key people: Sir Paul Nicholson (chairman); Frank Nicholson (CEO)

Vaux Brewery was a major brewer and hotel owner based in Sunderland, England. The company was listed on the London Stock Exchange. It was taken over by Whitbread in 2000.

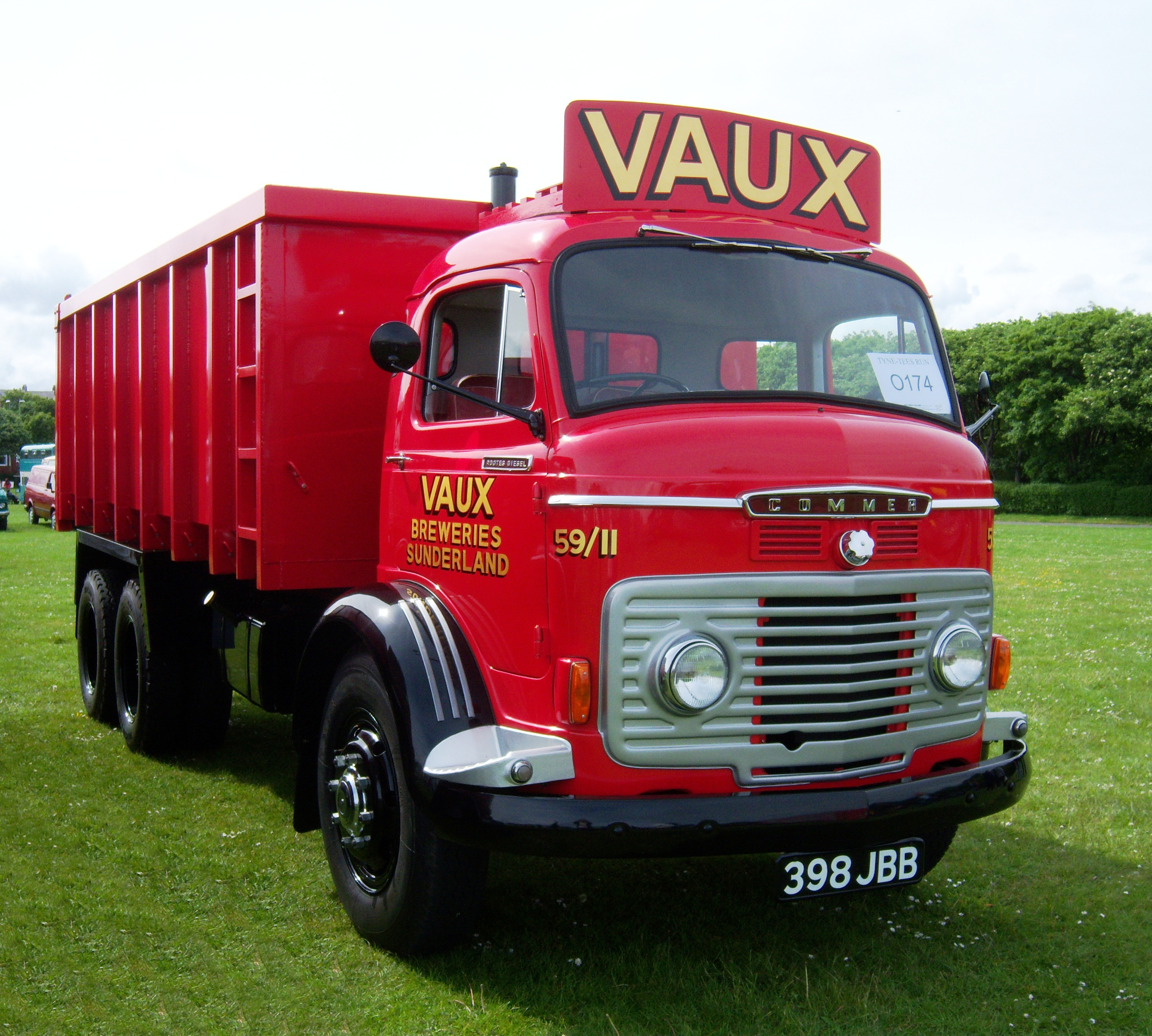
Commer delivery truck displaying Vaux livery

== History ==
The company was founded in 1806 by Cuthbert Vaux (1779–1850), producing several popular brands including Vaux's Stout, Maxim, Double Maxim, and Sunderland Best Bitter. For nearly 200 years, it was a major employer in the city.

In 1972, the company bought the Sheffield-based Wards Brewing Company, which it retained as a separate subsidiary. In 1981, it attempted to establish a foothold in the U.S. with the purchase of the New York-based family-owned Fred Koch Brewery.

By the 1990s, the Vaux Group had expanded into hotels. Despite the brewing business being profitable and an offer to buy it having been received from management, in March 1999 the Board accepted the advice of the Corporate Financier, BT Alex. Brown, a subsidiary of Deutsche Bank, and decided to close both breweries. This caused Chairman Sir Paul Nicholson, who disagreed with the closure decision, to resign. The company changed its name to Swallow Group plc, and in July sold its tenanted pub estate to a client of the corporate financier, concentrating on Swallow Hotels business and incorporating the former Vaux-managed pub estate under the Swallow Inns & Restaurants brand.

The company was taken over by Whitbread in 2000, following which most of the hotels were rebranded as Marriott and the larger pubs were brought under other national brands, such as Brewers Fayre. Later, 10 hotels unsuitable for Marriott conversions were sold off, forming the nucleus of a smaller Swallow Hotels chain, which collapsed in 2006.

In 2000, two former Vaux directors and the former head brewer formed what is now called the Maxim Brewery, buying some of the beer brands and recipes. They resurrected the former Samson and Double Maxim lines.

The Sunderland brewery was vacated and the buildings were demolished for redevelopment. In November 2014 a partnership between Carillion and Sunderland City Council was formed to redevelop the site. However, Carillion collapsed into liquidation in January 2018. After a six-month delay, redevelopment resumed in July 2018, with Tolent as the main contractor. Tolent subsequently also went into liquidation in early 2023, and completion of the contract passed to Wates Group.

In April 2019, a Sunderland-based company announced their intention to resurrect the Vaux brand. In March 2020, the new Vaux Brewery announced plans to open a new brewery and bar in the centre of Sunderland.

== Former brands ==
Former beer brands of Vaux include:

- Vaux Regal, a strong 'scotch' type ale.
- Gold Tankard
- Silver Tankard
- Samson bitter
- Double Maxim
- Single Maxim
- Bottled Red Label Ale (sweet stout) & Golden Ale (high alcohol content)
- Sunderland Draught Bitter
- Lorimer's Best Scotch
- Norseman Lager
- Frisk Lager
- Scorpion Lager
- How's Your Father, a light, golden, cask conditioned ale sold in summer.
- Moonlight Mouse, an autumn cask conditioned ale
- Waggledance, a cask conditioned honey ale, sold to Youngs when Vaux ceased brewing (now brewed by Eagle Brewery in Bedford by Marstons)
- Lambton's, an ale named after the Lambton family.
- Fighting Hares (Bottled Ale)
- Lorimer & Clark's 80/- A strong real ale.

== See also ==
- Ernest Vaux
