= NewcastleGateshead Initiative =

Brand name for a region of northeast England

- Headquarters: Neville Hall, Newcastle upon Tyne
- Location: Newcastle upon Tyne, Gateshead
- Chief Executive: Sarah Green
- Chief Operating Officer: Ian Thomas
- Parent organisation: Newcastle City Council; Gateshead Council
- Revenue: £3.65 million (2024/2025)
- Website: www.ngi.org.uk

The NewcastleGateshead Initiative (NGI) is an agency setup to establish and promote the NewcastleGateshead brand-name associated with the joint promotion of culture, business and tourism within the conurbation formed by Newcastle upon Tyne and Gateshead. With the use of printed matter and a web-site, the organisation produces, assembles activities and information into effective communication for local and regional visitors. The group organises various music and art related events to attract tourism to the region. In 2006, NewcastleGateshead was voted as the arts capital of the UK in a survey conducted by the Artsworld TV channel.

It failed in its bid for the status of 2008 European Capital of Culture, when the honour went to Liverpool.

In 2023, the NewcastleGateshead Initiative claimed it had brought significant investment to the region resulting in the creation of c. 1,000 jobs.

Chief Executive Sarah Green, was awarded an OBE and Chief Operating Officer Ian Thomas was awarded an MBE in the 2025 New Year Honours for services to tourism.

In March 2025, the Department for Culture, Media and Sport announced £1.35 million of 'Destination Development Partnership' funding to drive growth of the visitor economy in North East and West Midlands. This followed a pilot in 2022, run by the NewcastleGateshead Initiative, that was credited with supporting the opening of 11 new visitor attractions with a combined investment value of £13 million, alongside 60 new bars and restaurants.
