= List of public art in Newcastle upon Tyne =

This is a list of public art in Newcastle upon Tyne, including statues, busts and other memorials. This list applies only to works of public art on permanent display in an outdoor public space and as such does not include, for example, artworks in museums.

== City centre ==
Image	Title / subject	Location and coordinates	Date	Artist / designer	Architect / other	Type	Designation	Wikidata	Notes
More images	Grey's Monument	Monument Metro Station / Grey Street	1838	Edward Hodges Baily	John and Benjamin Green	40 m (130 ft) Doric column & Portland stone statue	Grade 1	Q5608058	
More images	George Stephenson	Junction of Westgate Road and Neville Street	1862	John Graham Lough	—N/a	Bronze statue on an octagonal pedestal and a base with four seated figures representing aspects of Stephenson's life and work	Grade II*	Q17552653	
More images	Drinking Fountain	Bigg Market	1894	Charles Errington	—N/a	5 m (16 ft) high x 2.5 m (8 ft 2 in) wide fountain in red sandstone with brass fittings	Grade II	Q26605963	Erected by the Band of Hope Union in memory of Dr JH Rutherford.
More images	Queen Victoria	St Nicholas Square	Unveiled 1903	Alfred Gilbert	—N/a	Seated bronze statue on a granite pedestal	Grade II*	Q17552291	
More images	William Armstrong, 1st Baron Armstrong	Barras Bridge, outside the Great North Museum: Hancock	1905-6	Hamo Thornycroft	William Henry Knowles	Bronze statue with a sandstone screen wall, steps and relief panels	Grade II	Q26586754	
More images	Queen Victoria	Grounds of the Royal Victoria Infirmary	1906	George Frampton	—N/a	Marble statue and stone pedestal	Grade II*	Q17552314	
More images	Alderman Sir Charles Frederick Hamond	Leazes Park	1908		—N/a	Bronze bust on a stone plinth	—N/a		
More images	South African War Memorial	Haymarket Hub	1908	Thomas Eyre Macklin	—N/a	Bronze winged victory figure on a hexagonal stone obelisk and square base with a figure representing Northumbria	Grade II*	Q17552334	
More images	Royal Tank Regiment War Memorial	Adjacent to church of St Thomas the Martyr, Haymarket	c.1920	J.Reid	—N/a	Bronze sculpture of St George and the dragon on a Portland stone pedestal with granite steps & stone seating	Grade II	Q26637887	
More images	Newcastle & District War memorial	Eldon Square	1923	Charles Leonard Hartwell	Cackett and Burns	Pedestal with bronze sculpture of St George and the dragon	Grade II*	Q26409308	
More images	Northumberland Fusiliers Memorial, The Response	Barras Bridge, north of Church of St Thomas the Martyr	1923	William Goscombe John	—N/a	Granite monument with bronze high relief figures and low relief carvings	Grade I	Q17552582	Parts cast at the A.B. Burton foundry at Thames Ditton; stonemasons, William Kirpatrick Ltd.
	Parsons' Polygon	Corner of Blackett St. and West Blackett Place	1985	David Hamilton	—N/a	Brick & fired tiles on a 3 m (9.8 ft) high x 2.2 m (7 ft 3 in) wide hexagonal structure with a sloping roof decorated as a tribute to Charles Algernon Parsons	—N/a		Serves as a ventilation shaft for Monument Metro Station
More images	Black Rhinoceros	Great North Museum: Hancock	1991	Christine Hill	—N/a	Concrete statue	—N/a		
More images	Burma War Memorial	Churchyard of St Thomas the Martyr, Haymarket	1991	Nick Whitmore	—N/a	Stone pedestal with bronze bas-relief	—N/a	Q83187704	
More images	The DNA Spiral	Times Square	2000	Charles Jencks	—N/a	4.5 m (15 ft) tall galvanised steel sculpture	—N/a		
More images	Basil Hume	St Mary's Cathedral, Clayton Street	2002	Nigel Boonham	—N/a	3 m (9.8 ft) high bronze statue on a sandstone plinth	—N/a		
More images	Man with Potential Selves	Grainger Street	2003	Sean Henry	—N/a	Set of three painted statues	—N/a		
More images	Ellipsis Eclipses	Newgate Street	2005	Danny Lane	—N/a	12 m (39 ft) tall glass and stainless steel sculpture	—N/a		
More images	Ever Changing	Junction of Bath Lane and Westgate Road	2005	Eilis O'Connell	—N/a	6 m (20 ft) high inverted stainless steel cone sculpture	—N/a		

== Civic Centre ==
Image	Title / subject	Location and coordinates	Date	Artist / designer	Architect / other	Type	Designation	Notes
More images	The River God Tyne	Newcastle Civic Centre	1968	David Wynne	George Kenyon	Wall mounted bronze statue	Grade II*	
More images	Swans in Flight	Newcastle Civic Centre	1968	David Wynne	George Kenyon	Bronze statues	Grade II*	
	Seahorse Heads	Top of Civic Centre tower	1968	JRM McCheyne	George Kenyon	12 cast bronze seahorse heads, each 1.4 m (4 ft 7 in) high x 1.6 m (5 ft 3 in) wide	Grade II*	

== St James' Park ==
Image	Title / subject	Location and coordinates	Date	Artist / designer	Architect / other	Type	Designation	Notes
More images	Jackie Milburn	South-east corner of St. James' Park	1991	Susanna Robinson	—N/a	Bronze statue	—N/a	The statue was located elsewhere prior to 2012.
More images	Bobby Robson	South-west corner of St. James' Park	2012	Tom Maley	—N/a	Bronze statue	—N/a	
More images	Alan Shearer	Barrack Road	2016	Tom Maley	—N/a	Bronze statue	—N/a	

== Quayside ==
Image	Title / subject	Location and coordinates	Date	Artist / designer	Architect / other	Type	Designation	Wikidata	Notes
More images	John Wesley Memorial Fountain	Quayside	1891	—N/a	—N/a	Pink & grey granite obelisk with a grey plinth	Grade II	Q26275654	
More images	Siren	Sandyford Steps, Quayside	1995	André Wallace	—N/a	Bronze statue of a female torso on a steel column	—N/a		
More images	River God	Sandgate	1996	André Wallace	—N/a	Bronze statue of a male torso on an 8.7 m (29 ft) steel column	—N/a		Companion piece to Siren by the same artist.
More images	The Blacksmith's Needle	St Ann's Wharf, Quayside	1996	Stephen Lunn and members of the British Association of Blacksmith Artists	—N/a	Forged iron column, 5 m (16 ft) high x 1.3 m (4 ft 3 in) diameter	—N/a		
	Rudder	Keelman Square	1996	Andrew Burton	—N/a	3.8 m (12 ft) high x 2.9 m (9 ft 6 in) wide x 90 cm (35 in) deep, Bronze sculpture	—N/a		
	Column and Steps	Keelman Square	1996	Andrew Burton	—N/a	4.5 m (15 ft) tall steel column, of 40 cm (16 in) diameter, topped with an abstract motif and with geometrical pieces at its base.	—N/a		
More images	Swirle Pavilion	St Ann's Wharf, Quayside	1996	Raf Fulcher	—N/a	Stone, metal and concrete 9.5 m (31 ft) high folly consisting of a 10 m (33 ft) diameter open circular chamber below a gilded orb.	—N/a		
	River Tyne	Retaining wall by Wesley Memorial Fountain, Quayside	1996	Neil Talbot	—N/a	30 m (98 ft) long x 3 m (9.8 ft) high sandstone carving	—N/a		
