= Gateshead Council =

Local government body in England

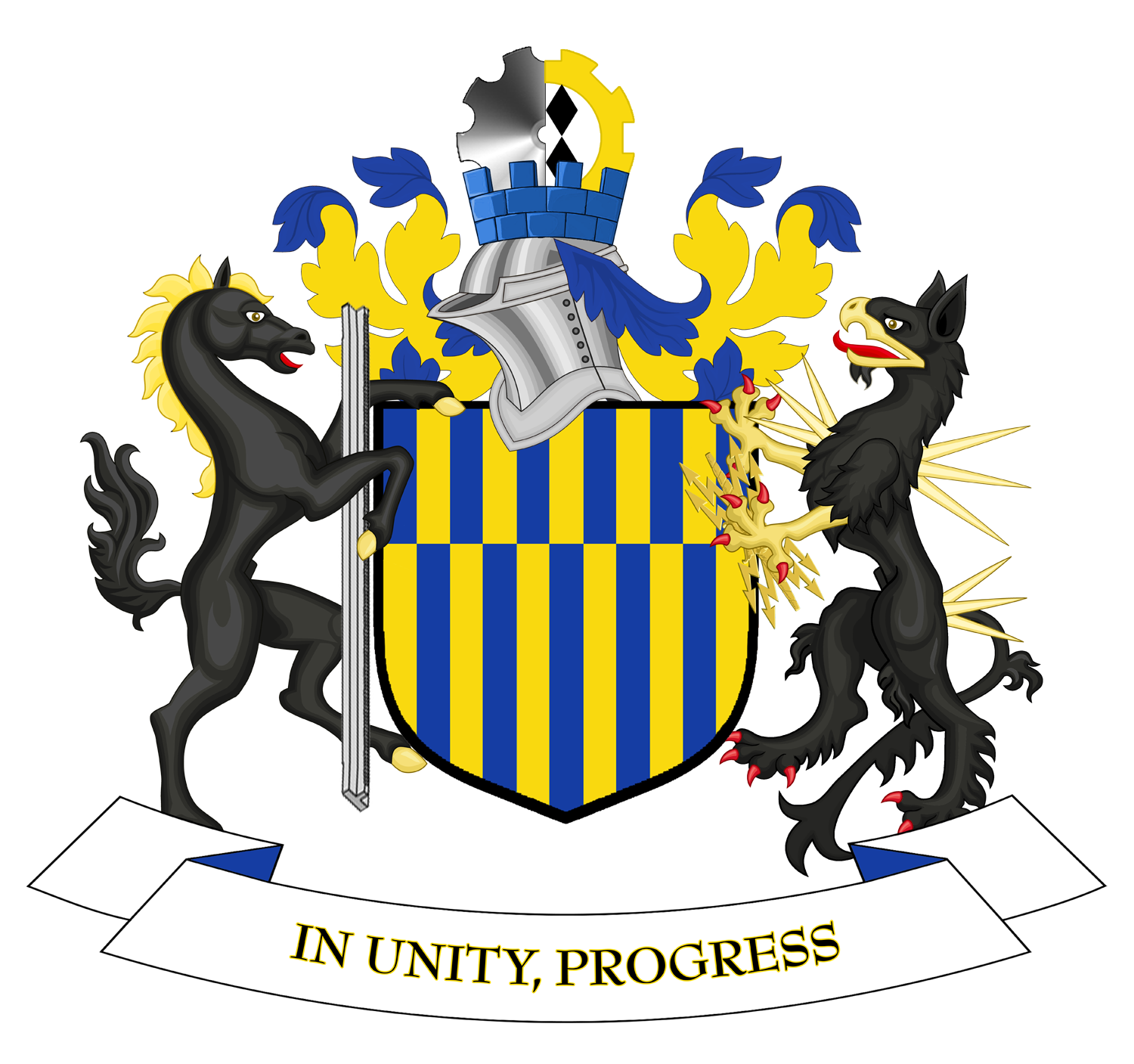

Type
- Type: Metropolitan borough

Leadership
- Mayor: Andrea Graham, Reform UK since 29 May 2026
- Leader: Nick Allan, Reform UK since 29 May 2026
- Chief Executive: Dale Owens since 1 June 2024

Structure
- Seats: 66 councillors
- Graph of the party split among 66 seats.
- Political groups: Administration (38) Reform (38) Other parties (28) Labour (12) Liberal Democrats (12) Green (3) Independent (1)

Elections
- Voting system: First-past-the-post
- Last election: 7 May 2026
- Next election: 6 May 2027

Meeting place
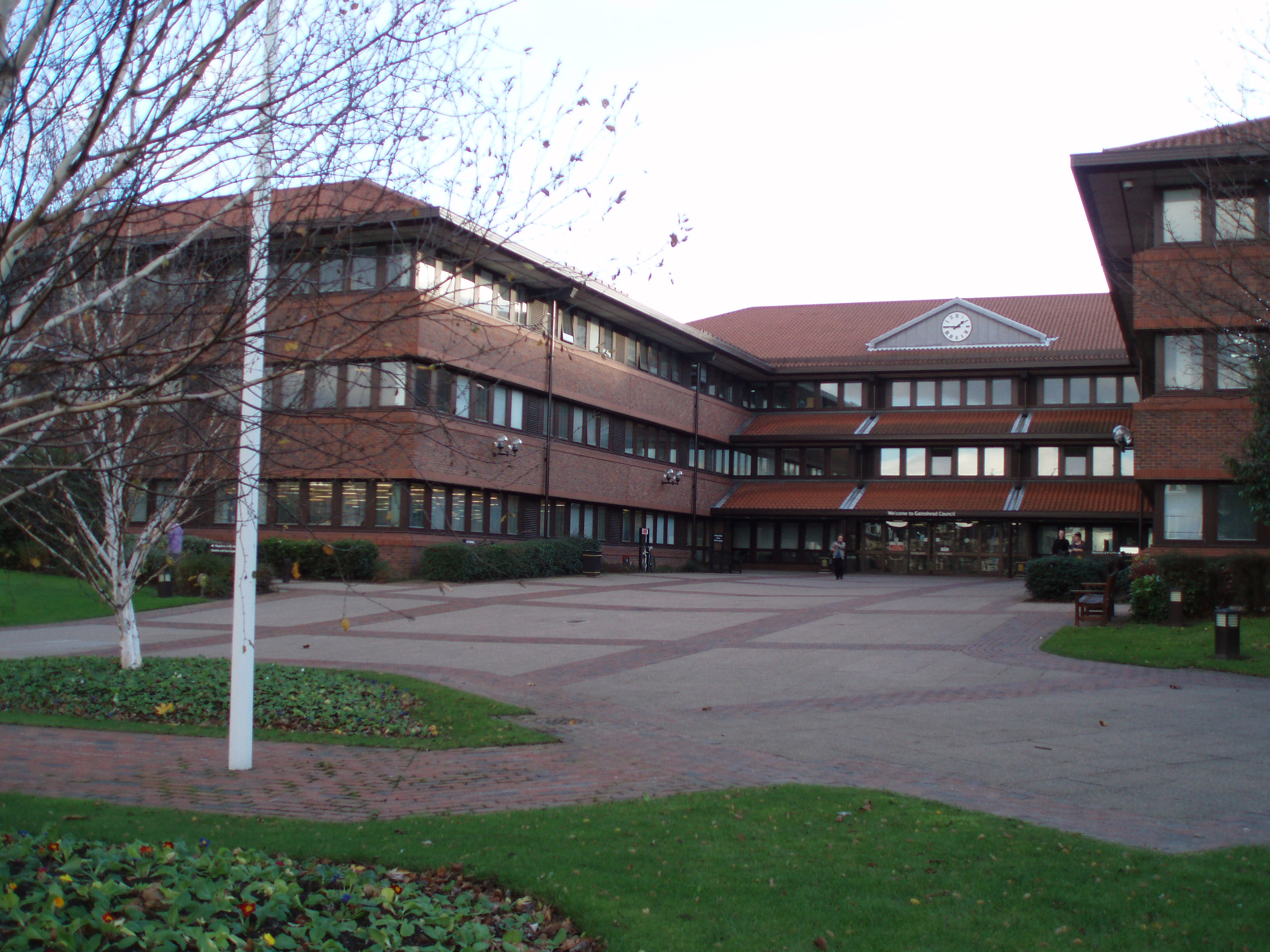
- Civic Centre, Regent Street, Gateshead, NE8 1HH

Website
- www.gateshead.gov.uk

Gateshead Council is the local authority for the Metropolitan Borough of Gateshead in the ceremonial county of Tyne and Wear, England. It is a metropolitan borough council and provides the majority of local government services in the borough. The council is a member of the North East Combined Authority.

The council has been under Reform UK majority control since May 2026. it is based at Gateshead Civic Centre.

== History ==
The modern council was created in 1974 under the Local Government Act 1972. It was initially a lower tier district authority, with Tyne and Wear County Council providing county-level services. Since the abolition of the county council in 1986, Gateshead Council has provided both district-level and county-level functions, with some services being provided through joint arrangements with the other Tyne and Wear councils.

In 2024 a combined authority was established covering Gateshead, County Durham, Newcastle upon Tyne, North Tyneside, Northumberland, South Tyneside and Sunderland, called the North East Mayoral Combined Authority. It is chaired by the directly elected Mayor of the North East and oversees the delivery of certain strategic functions across the area.

There is one civil parish in the borough at Lamesley, which forms an additional tier of local government for its area; the rest of the borough is unparished. Birtley was also a civil parish with a town council until it was abolished in 2006.

== Governance ==
=== Political control ===
The council has been under Reform majority control since the May 2026 election. Prior to that, it had been under Labour majority control since the modern borough's creation in 1974.

Party in control	Years
Labour	1974–2026
Reform	2026–present

=== Leadership ===
The role of mayor is largely ceremonial in Gateshead. Political leadership is instead provided by the leader of the council. The leaders since 2002 have been:

Councillor	Party	From	To
Mick Henry	Labour	2002	20 May 2016
Martin Gannon	Labour	20 May 2016	May 2026
Nick Allan	Reform	29 May 2026	

=== Composition ===
Following the 2026 election, and a subsequent change of allegiance in October 2026, the composition of the council was:

Party	Seats
Reform	38
Labour	12
Liberal Democrats	12
Green	3
Independent	1
Total	66

The next election is due in 2027.

== Elections ==
Since the last boundary changes took effect in 2026, the council has comprised 66 councillors representing 22 wards, with each ward electing three councillors. Elections are held three years out of every four, with a third of the council (one councillor for each ward) elected each time for a four-year term of office.

== Premises ==
The council is based at the Civic Centre on Regent Street, which was purpose-built for the council and was completed in 1987.

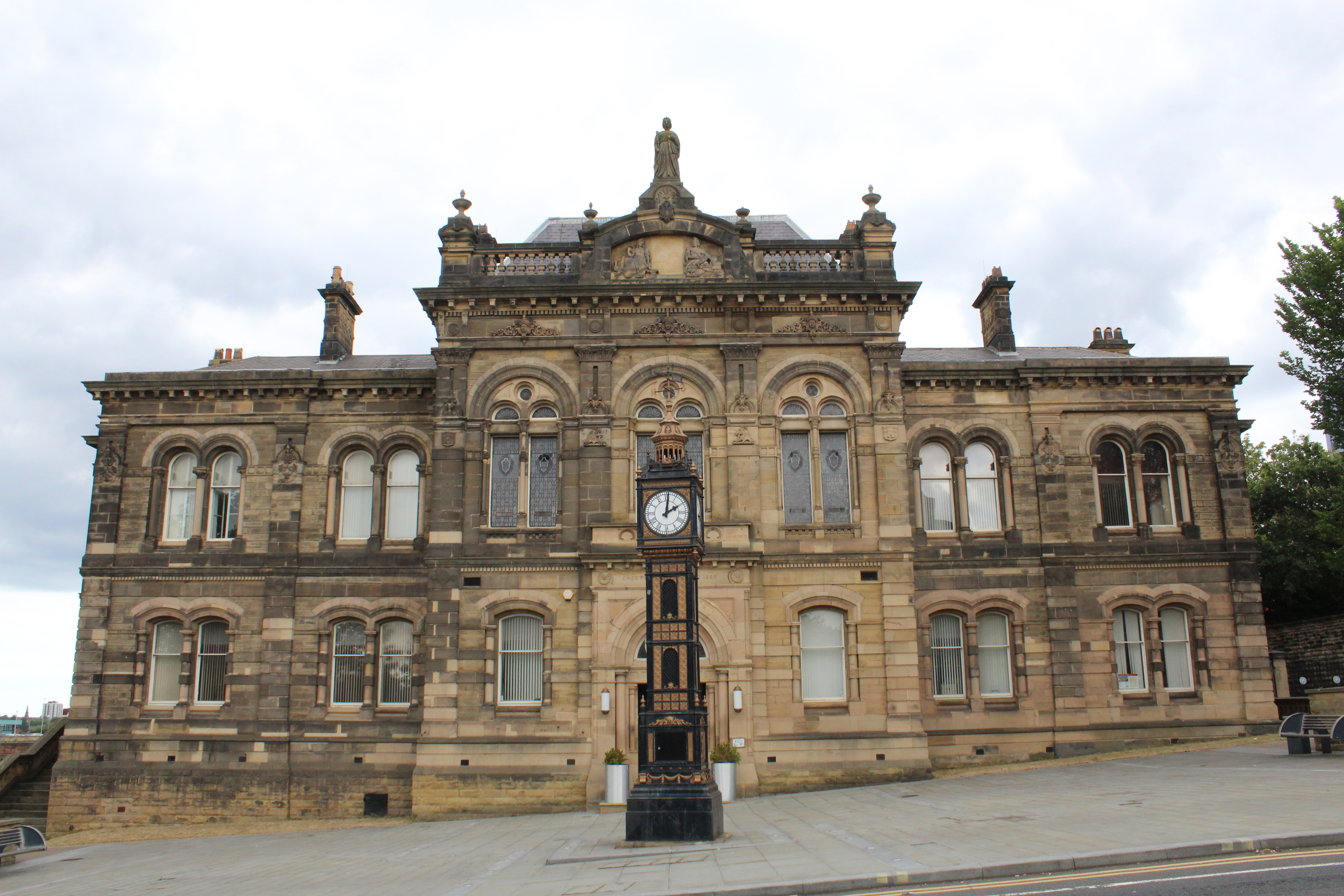
Old Town Hall: Council's headquarters 1870–1987

Prior to 1987 the council had been based at the Town Hall on West Street, which had been completed in 1870 for the old Gateshead Borough Council.
