= 2024 Gateshead Metropolitan Borough Council election =

2024 local election in Gateshead, England

- 2 May 2024

22 of 66 seats on Gateshead Metropolitan Borough Council 34 seats needed for a majority
- Turnout: 50,083 (34.8%)

	First party	Second party
Leader	Martin Gannon	Ron Beadle
Party	Labour	Liberal Democrats
Last election	49 seats, 50.2%	17 seats, 27.4%
Seats before	49	17
Seats won	16	6
Seats after	48	18
Seat change	▼1	▲1
Popular vote	24,775	12,812
Percentage	49.5%	25.6%
- Winner of each seat at the 2024 Gateshead Metropolitan Borough Council election
Leader before election
Martin Gannon
Labour
Leader after election
Martin Gannon
Labour

The 2024 Gateshead Metropolitan Borough Council election was held on 2 May 2024, alongside the other local elections across the United Kingdom on the same day. Labour retained its majority on the council.

== Background ==
Result of the council election when these seats were last contested in 2021

Result of the most recent council election in 2023

The Local Government Act 1972 created a two-tier system of metropolitan counties and districts covering Greater Manchester, Merseyside, South Yorkshire, Tyne and Wear, the West Midlands, and West Yorkshire starting in 1974. Gateshead was a district of the Tyne and Wear metropolitan county. The Local Government Act 1985 abolished the metropolitan counties, with metropolitan districts taking on most of their powers as metropolitan boroughs.

Gateshead Council has continuously been under Labour control since its creation. The Liberal Democrats have generally been the main opposition. In the most recent election in 2023, Labour won 15 seats on 50.2% of the vote and the Liberal Democrats won 7 seats on 27.4% of the vote. The Conservatives received 12.5% of the vote and the Green Party received 7.5% of the vote, but neither party won any seats.

Positions up for election in 2024 were last up for election in 2021. In that election, Labour won 19 seats and the Liberal Democrats won five seats.

== Electoral process ==
The council elects its councillors in thirds, with a third being up for election every year for three years, with no election in the fourth year. The election took place by first-past-the-post voting, with wards generally being represented by three councillors, with one elected in each election year to serve a four-year term.

All registered electors (British, Irish, Commonwealth and European Union citizens) living in Gateshead aged 18 or over will be entitled to vote in the election. People who live at two addresses in different councils, such as university students with different term-time and holiday addresses, are entitled to be registered for and vote in elections in both local authorities. Voting in-person at polling stations will take place from 07:00 to 22:00 on election day, and voters will be able to apply for postal votes or proxy votes in advance of the election.

== Previous composition ==
After 2023 election		Before 2024 election		After 2024 election	
Party	Seats	Party	Seats	Party	Seats
Labour	49	Labour	49	Labour	48
Liberal Democrats	17	Liberal Democrats	17	Liberal Democrats	18

== Results summary ==
The election saw the Liberal Democrats take one seat from Labour, but no other seats changed party and so Labour retained their large majority on the council.

2024 Gateshead Metropolitan Borough Council election
Party	This election			Full council			This election		
Party	Seats	Net	Seats %	Other	Total	Total %	Votes	Votes %	+/−
Labour	16	▼1	72.7	32	48	72.7	24,775	49.5	-0.7
Liberal Democrats	6	▲1	27.3	12	18	27.3	12,812	25.6	-1.8
Conservative	0	Steady	0.0	0	0	0.0	5,761	11.5	-1.0
Green	0	Steady	0.0	0	0	0.0	4,848	9.7	+2.2
TUSC	0	Steady	0.0	0	0	0.0	557	1.1	0.0
Independent	0	Steady	0.0	0	0	0.0	412	0.8	+0.2
Reform	0	Steady	0.0	0	0	0.0	303	0.6	+0.3
Save Us Now	0	Steady	0.0	0	0	0.0	83	0.2	0.0
North East	0	Steady	0.0	0	0	0.0	82	0.2	N/A

== Ward results ==
The results for each ward were:

=== Birtley ===
Birtley
Party	Candidate	Votes	%	±%
Liberal Democrats	Joe Sowerby	892	43.0	−13.6
Labour	Hazel Weatherley	887	42.8	+7.3
Conservative	Joseph Ronald Callanan	170	8.2	+0.4
Independent	Michelle Mabel Hepburn	125	6.0	+6.0
Majority		5	0.0	−21.1
Turnout		2088	33.6	−1.8
Registered electors		6,212		
Liberal Democrats gain from Labour		Swing		

=== Blaydon ===
Blaydon
Party	Candidate	Votes	%	±%
Labour	Stephen Christopher Ronchetti	1,275	60.8	−4.8
Conservative	John Michael McConnel	297	14.2	+3.3
Liberal Democrats	Joanne Stanton	211	10.1	−7.5
Green	Ralf Russow	207	9.9	+9.9
TUSC	Tom Allen	108	5.1	−0.7
Majority		978	46.6	−1.4
Turnout		2113	29.5	+1.3
Registered electors		7,174		
Labour hold		Swing		

=== Bridges ===
Bridges
Party	Candidate	Votes	%	±%
Labour	John Eagle	871	49.0	−10.8
Green	Rachel Mary Cabral	581	32.7	+18.3
Conservative	Edward Bohill	191	10.7	−5.3
Liberal Democrats	Gareth Cooper	136	7.6	−3.8
Majority		290	16.3	−25.9
Turnout		1801	30.8	+3.3
Registered electors		5,851		
Labour hold		Swing		

=== Chopwell and Rowlands Gill ===
Chopwell and Rowlands Gill
Party	Candidate	Votes	%	±%
Labour	Jamie Joe Park	1,916	70.9	+4.1
Conservative	Alexander Robert Telford	419	15.5	−0.5
Liberal Democrats	Jean Callender	368	13.6	+1.0
Majority		1497	55.4	+4.6
Turnout		2738	40.3	+2.3
Registered electors		6,788		
Labour hold		Swing		

=== Chowdene ===
Chowdene
Party	Candidate	Votes	%	±%
Labour	John McElroy	1,110	50.4	−7.2
Liberal Democrats	Catherine Mary Knell	366	16.6	+2.9
Reform	Damian Heslop	303	13.8	+13.8
Conservative	David William Potts	215	9.8	−9.1
Green	Thomas Frederick Newell	127	5.8	+0.3
North East Party	Emile Persaud	82	3.7	+3.7
Majority		744	37.8	−0.9
Turnout		2216	33.8	+0.6
Registered electors		6,549		
Labour hold		Swing		

=== Crawcrook and Greenside ===
Crawcrook and Greenside
Party	Candidate	Votes	%	±%
Labour	Kath McCartney	1,520	54.3	+6.2
Green	Pat Chanse	589	21.1	−14.5
Independent	Doug Musgrove	287	10.3	+10.3
Conservative	Susan Mary Wilson	273	9.8	−1.4
Liberal Democrats	Robin Stanaway	128	4.6	−0.5
Majority		931	33.2	+25.7
Turnout		2817	39.5	−0.6
Registered electors		7,136		
Labour hold		Swing		

=== Deckham ===
Deckham
Party	Candidate	Votes	%	±%
Labour Co-op	Leigh Kirton	1,079	53.5	−3.2
Green	Gary Rutherford Brooks	308	15.3	+5.1
Liberal Democrats	Steven Hawkins	255	12.6	+1.0
Conservative	Josh Alan Knotts	247	12.3	+0.7
TUSC	Norman Hall	127	6.3	+3.6
Majority		771	38.2	−12.9
Turnout		2028	31.7	+1.3
Registered electors		6,393		
Labour Co-op hold		Swing		

=== Dunston and Teams ===
Dunston and Teams
Party	Candidate	Votes	%	±%
Labour	Brenda Clelland	1,057	61.4	+0.4
Green	Andy Blanchflower	295	17.1	+17.1
Liberal Democrats	Alexander Walls	197	11.4	−9.7
Conservative	Mojgan Safaralinejad	173	10.0	−7.8
Majority		762	44.3	+4.4
Turnout		1742	29.1	+1.6
Registered electors		5,978		
Labour hold		Swing		

=== Dunston Hill and Whickham East ===
Dunston Hill and Whickham East
Party	Candidate	Votes	%	±%
Liberal Democrats	Peter Maughan	1,184	48.7	−3.0
Labour	Andrew Dylan Moir	753	31.0	+4.1
Green	Mary Blanchflower	235	9.7	+1.4
Conservative	Jak Hocking	174	7.2	−0.9
Save Us Now	Graham Steele	83	3.4	+0.3
Majority		431	17.7	−7.1
Turnout		2445	36.7	−0.3
Registered electors		6,664		
Liberal Democrats hold		Swing		

=== Felling ===
Felling
Party	Candidate	Votes	%	±%
Labour	Sonya Dickie	937	62.6	+0.3
Conservative	Peter Crompton Jackson	199	13.3	−4.2
Green	Ashleigh Taylor McLean	190	12.7	+2.5
Liberal Democrats	Shakun Beadle	171	11.4	+2.0
Majority		738	49.3	+3.9
Turnout		1509	26.5	+0.4
Registered electors		5,689		
Labour hold		Swing		

=== High Fell ===
High Fell
Party	Candidate	Votes	%	±%
Labour	Barry Robert Turnbull	896	56.6	−16.3
Conservative	Francis Thomas Athey	214	13.5	+3.7
Liberal Democrats	Len Bell	187	11.8	+1.7
TUSC	Elaine Brunskill	164	10.4	+3.1
Green	Joe Painter	122	7.7	+7.7
Majority		682	43.1	−19.7
Turnout		1595	26.5	−8.7
Registered electors		6,018		
Labour hold		Swing		

=== Lamesley ===
Lamesley
Party	Candidate	Votes	%	±%
Labour	Judith Turner	1,457	63.5	+0.8
Conservative	Richard Herdman	444	19.4	+0.4
Liberal Democrats	Janice Wharton	393	17.1	+7.2
Majority		1013	44.1	+0.4
Turnout		2327	31.9	+1.0
Registered electors		7,301		
Labour hold		Swing		

=== Lobley Hill and Bensham ===
Lobley Hill and Bensham
Party	Candidate	Votes	%	±%
Labour	Catherine Donovan	1,274	58.1	−1.5
Green	Andy Redfern	319	14.5	+2.5
Conservative	John Rogan Gardiner	305	13.9	−1.7
Liberal Democrats	Catherine Mulvie	296	13.5	+0.8
Majority		955	43.6	−0.4
Turnout		2224	31.9	+0.5
Registered electors		6,978		
Labour hold		Swing		

=== Low Fell ===
Low Fell
Party	Candidate	Votes	%	±%
Liberal Democrats	Daniel Stephen Duggan	1,749	53.1	−5.9
Labour	Robert Lee Waugh	954	28.7	+1.9
Green	Campbell Grant	323	9.7	+0.2
Conservative	Paul Sterling	187	5.6	+0.9
TUSC	Simon James Morden	82	2.5	+2.5
Majority		795	24.4	−7.8
Turnout		3320	48.3	+2.7
Registered electors		6,871		
Liberal Democrats hold		Swing		

=== Pelaw and Heworth ===
Pelaw and Heworth
Party	Candidate	Votes	%	±%
Liberal Democrats	Ian Patterson	1,290	55.5	+2.8
Labour	Jennifer Reay	765	32.9	−4.9
Green	Nicholas Boldrini	208	8.9	+2.8
Conservative	Ali Reza Akbari Pargam	63	2.7	−0.6
Majority		525	22.6	+7.7
Turnout		2326	36.5	+0.9
Registered electors		6,396		
Liberal Democrats hold		Swing		

=== Ryton, Crookhill and Stella ===
Ryton Crookhill and Stella
Party	Candidate	Votes	%	±%
Labour	Christopher William Buckley	1,315	45.2	−12.2
Liberal Democrats	Stephen Paul Kelly	830	28.5	+20.5
Conservative	Christopher Anthony Coxon	392	13.5	+2.9
Green	Andrew Mason	296	10.2	−1.5
TUSC	Ros Cooper	76	2.6	+0.8
Majority		485	16.7	−29.0
Turnout		2936	41.1	+2.0
Registered electors		7,146		
Labour hold		Swing		

=== Saltwell ===
Saltwell
Party	Candidate	Votes	%	±%
Labour	Denise Marianne Robson	1,131	52.2	+9.9
Liberal Democrats	Jamie Rickelton	689	31.8	−13.4
Green	Ravi Cabra	197	9.1	+2.9
Conservative	Robert Ableson	150	6.9	+0.7
Majority		442	20.4	+17.5
Turnout		2189	34.4	+2.0
Registered electors		6,358		
Labour hold		Swing		

=== Wardley and Leam Lane ===
Wardley and Leam Lane
Party	Candidate	Votes	%	±%
Labour	Jill Green	1,290	66.6	+0.3
Liberal Democrats	David Graham Randall	345	17.8	−0.1
Conservative	John Robert McNeil	302	15.6	−0.2
Majority		945	48.8	+0.4
Turnout		1964	33.4	+1.2
Registered electors		5,877		
Labour hold		Swing		

=== Whickham North ===
Whickham North
Party	Candidate	Votes	%	±%
Liberal Democrats	Sonya Hawkins	1,331	57.9	−6.0
Labour	Jeff Bowe	614	26.7	−0.9
Conservative	John Callanan	204	8.9	+0.5
Green	Diane Cadman	149	6.5	+6.5
Majority		717	31.2	−5.1
Turnout		2315	37.5	−0.5
Registered electors		6,166		
Liberal Democrats hold		Swing		

=== Whickham South and Sunniside ===
Whickham South and Sunniside
Party	Candidate	Votes	%	±%
Liberal Democrats	Jonathan Mohammed	1,238	44.8	−19.5
Labour	David Robert Lowes	1,102	39.9	+16.6
Conservative	Perry Wilson	282	10.2	+0.6
Green	James Richard Standaloft	143	5.2	+5.2
Majority		136	4.9	−36.1
Turnout		2781	42.7	−1.2
Registered electors		6,511		
Liberal Democrats hold		Swing		

=== Windy Nook and Whitehills ===
Windy Nook and Whitehills
Party	Candidate	Votes	%	±%
Labour	Rachel Louise Mullen	1,137	55.7	−6.5
Liberal Democrats	Susan Walker	361	17.7	+4.8
Conservative	Kyle Lambert Murray	352	17.3	−0.7
Green	Ruth Christina Grant	190	9.3	+2.3
Majority		776	38.0	−6.2
Turnout		2069	29.8	+1.2
Registered electors		6,933		
Labour hold		Swing		

=== Winlaton and High Spen ===
Winlaton and High Spen
Party	Candidate	Votes	%	±%
Labour	Julie Simpson	1,435	57.2	−0.3
Conservative	Jordan-Lee Guthrie	508	20.3	−5.3
Green	Paul Martin McNally	369	14.7	+2.8
Liberal Democrats	Lynda Duggan	195	7.8	+2.8
Majority		927	36.9	+5.0
Turnout		2530	37.0	+0.3
Registered electors		6,846		
Labour hold		Swing		

== Changes 2024-2026 ==
- June 2024: Labour councillor Bob Goldsworthy (Bridges) died, aged 67.
- September 2024: Labour councillor Jane McCoid (Lamesley) left the party to sit as an independent.
- October 2024: Liberal Democrat councillor Sonya Hawkins (Whickham North) resigned.
- June 2025: Labour councillor Robert Waugh (Bridges) left the party to sit as an independent.
- January 2026: Labour councillor Tom Graham (Windy Nook and Whitehills) died, aged 82. As the council was due to elect all 66 seats at the 2026 election following a boundary review, no by-election was held; the seat remained vacant until that election, at which Labour lost all three Windy Nook & Whitehills seats to Reform UK.
- March 2026: Labour councillor Jim Turnbull (Windy Nook and Whitehills) died, aged 85. As with Graham's seat above, no by-election was held ahead of the all-out 2026 election.

=== By-elections ===
==== Bridges ====
Bridges by-election, 12 September 2024
Party	Candidate	Votes	%	±%
Labour	Robert Waugh	320	30.6	
Liberal Democrats	Jonathan Aibi	255	24.4	
Green	Rachel Cabral	253	24.2	
Reform	David Ayre	166	15.9	
Conservative	Paul Sterling	53	5.1	
Majority		65	6.2	
Turnout		1,048	17.5	
Registered electors		6,001		
Labour hold		Swing		

The by-election was triggered by the death of Bob Goldsworthy.

==== Whickham North ====
Whickham North by-election: 24 October 2024
Party	Candidate	Votes	%	±%
Liberal Democrats	Susan Craig	902	64.6	+6.7
Labour	Jeff Bowe	285	20.4	–6.3
Conservative	Robert Ableson	137	9.8	+0.9
Green	Pat Chanse	72	5.2	–1.3
Majority		617	44.2	+13.0
Turnout		1,406	22.8	–14.7
Registered electors		6,164		
Liberal Democrats hold		Swing	▲6.5	

The by-election was triggered by the resignation of Sonya Hawkins.
