= Queen's Hall, Hexham =

Municipal building in Hexham, Northumberland, England

Queen's Hall
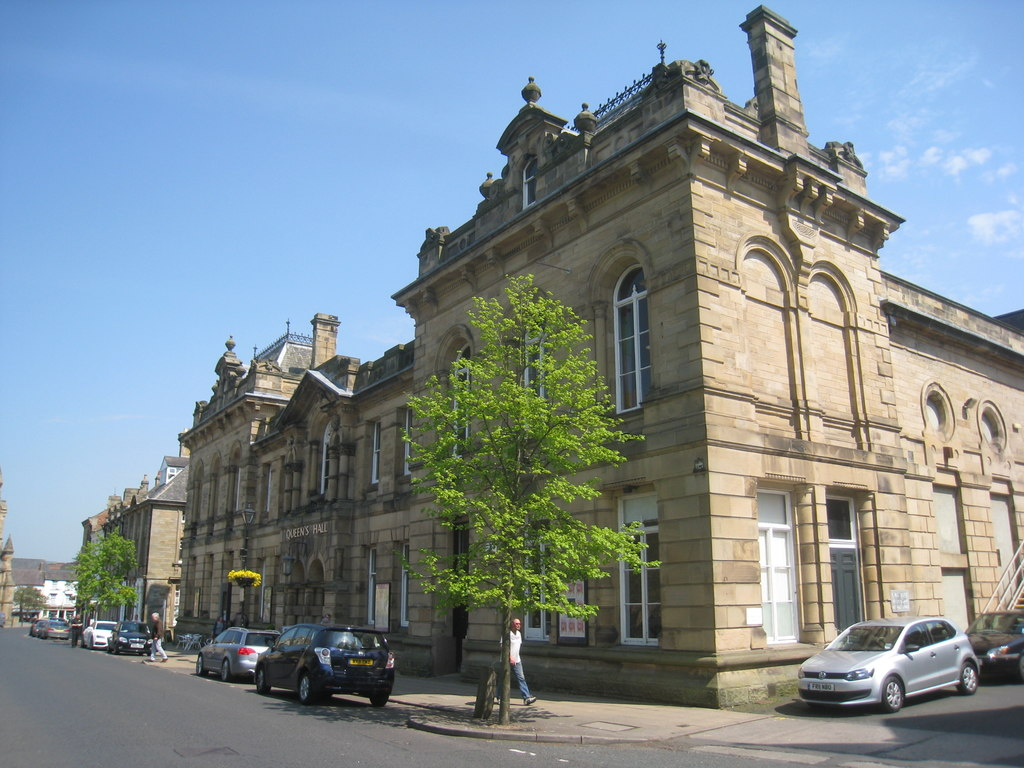
- Queen's Hall

- Shown in Northumberland
- 54.9706°N 2.1026°W
- Location: Beaumont Street, Hexham

History
- Built: 1866

Site notes
- Architect: John Johnstone
- Architectural style: Italianate style

Listed Building – Grade II
- Official name: Queen's Hall and Town Hall Buildings
- Designated: 5 April 1973
- Reference no.: 1042607

The Queen's Hall, formerly Hexham Town Hall, is a municipal structure in Beaumont Street, Hexham, Northumberland, England. The structure, which was the headquarters of Hexham Urban District Council and is now an arts centre, is a Grade II listed building.

== History ==
The first municipal building in the town was a 14th-century moot hall in the Market Place which was originally built as a defensive structure against the Scots and later became a courthouse for county court hearings. The petty session hearings were held in the White Hart Inn in Fore Street. In the mid-19th century, the lord of the manor, Wentworth Blackett Beaumont, proposed the removal of some old tenement buildings just to the east of the remains of the abbey wall. In response a group of local businessmen led by a local solicitor, Charles Head, formed a private company to raise the money to erect a dedicated municipal structure for the town: the old tenement buildings were demolished and a wooded area just to the west of the remains of the abbey wall was cleared of trees to make way for a new street which became known as Beaumont Street.

The foundation stone for the new building was laid by Beaumont in 1865. It was designed by John Johnstone in the Italianate style, built in ashlar stone at a cost of £8,000 and was officially opened on 13 September 1866. The design involved a symmetrical main frontage with eleven bays facing onto Beaumont Street with the outer wings, each of three bays, increased in height and slightly projected forward; the central section of five bays involved a central bay which featured, on the ground floor, a pair of round headed doorways flanked by Doric order columns supporting architraves and, on the first floor, an elaborate round headed window flanked by pairs of Corinthian order columns supporting voussoirs and an open pediment. The other bays in the central section were fenestrated with sash windows and the bays in the outer wings were fenestrated with sash windows on the ground floor and round headed windows flanked by colonettes on the first floor. At roof level there was a modillioned cornice supported by brackets. Internally, the north wing contained the offices of Lambton's Banking Company, the central section contained a corn exchange and the south wing contained the offices of the local board of health and the civic rooms.

Following significant population growth, largely associated with the status of Hexham as a market town, the area became an urban district with the town hall as its headquarters in 1894. After a fall in the prices of farming goods, the company which owned the building got into financial difficulties and the building closed in 1917. A new group of businessmen, led by Thomas Herbert Scott, formed a new company to acquire and re-open the building: the south wing became a cinema in March 1921 and the central section became a ballroom known as the Queen's Hall in 1924. Meanwhile, Hexham Urban District Council acquired a property in Gilesgate, now known as Hexham House, and relocated the council officers and their departments to that location in 1928. The Queen's Hall was badly damaged in a fire in February 1931 but was quickly restored and re-opened with a new art deco ceiling in July 1931. The south wing became a bingo hall in the early-1960s and continued in that use until the mid-1970s.

After the fabric of the building was found to have badly deteriorated, the complex was acquired by Northumberland County Council and Tynedale District Council in 1975: the new owners retained the north wing as offices, converted the central section into a library and re-purposed the south wing as a theatre and arts centre. The new theatre and arts centre, which was intended to offer live performances for the local community, opened in October 1983.

A collection of 10,000 books, which had been presented by a local grocery chain proprietor, Joseph William Brough, in 1948, was relocated from the moot hall to the new library in 1983. The Brough Local Studies Collection subsequently became the second-largest local history collection in the UK. The entire complex was acquired by a charitable entity in 2001 and an extensive programme of refurbishment works, involving the modernisation of much of the building, was completed in 2008.
