= Jesmond Vale =

Area in Newcastle upon Tyne, England, United Kingdom

Coordinates: 54.9840701°N 1.5899737°W

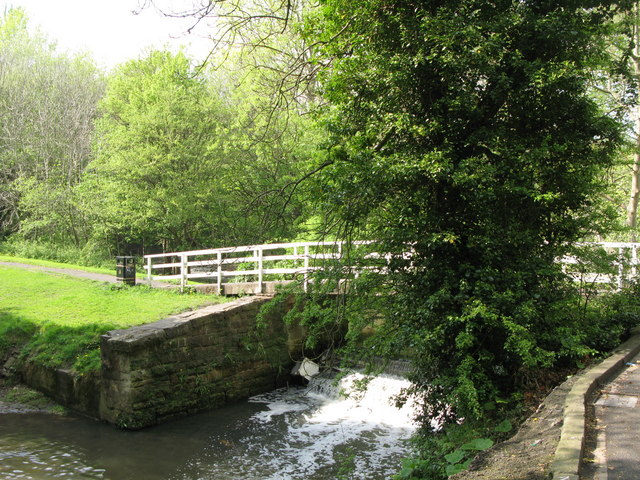
Ouseburn footbridge

Jesmond Vale is a town located in Newcastle upon Tyne, England. situated in the Ouseburn Valley, an area with diverse fauna, mature trees, and a rich history of industrial archeology. The surrounding areas are commonly used for entertainment and outdoor activities.

== Geography ==
The area includes Armstrong Park, Heaton Park, and part of Ouseburn. It has other recreational green areas, housing, allotment gardens, and a pub. It also includes a street named 'Jesmond Vale'. The locality is a mainly wooded and grassed area between The Cradlewell and Armstrong Bridge to the north and Burnville (left side) Stratford Road (right side) leading to Stratford Grove to the South.

The Ouseburn River flows through this area and into the River Tyne. It is mostly administered by the city council ward of South Jesmond. The Ouseburn flows from the north, through Jesmond Dene, then underneath the historic Armstrong Bridge where it enters Jesmond Vale. After this trip, it runs between some allotment gardens alongside the lower edges of Armstrong Park and Heaton Park, flowing over a weir at the white bridge near Greenwater Pool. It then flows near The Bluebell Inn and on past the former Newcastle music resource centre. It goes under another stone bridge, then it enters a culvert, where Jesmond Vale ends and the Lower Ouseburn Valley begins.

== History ==
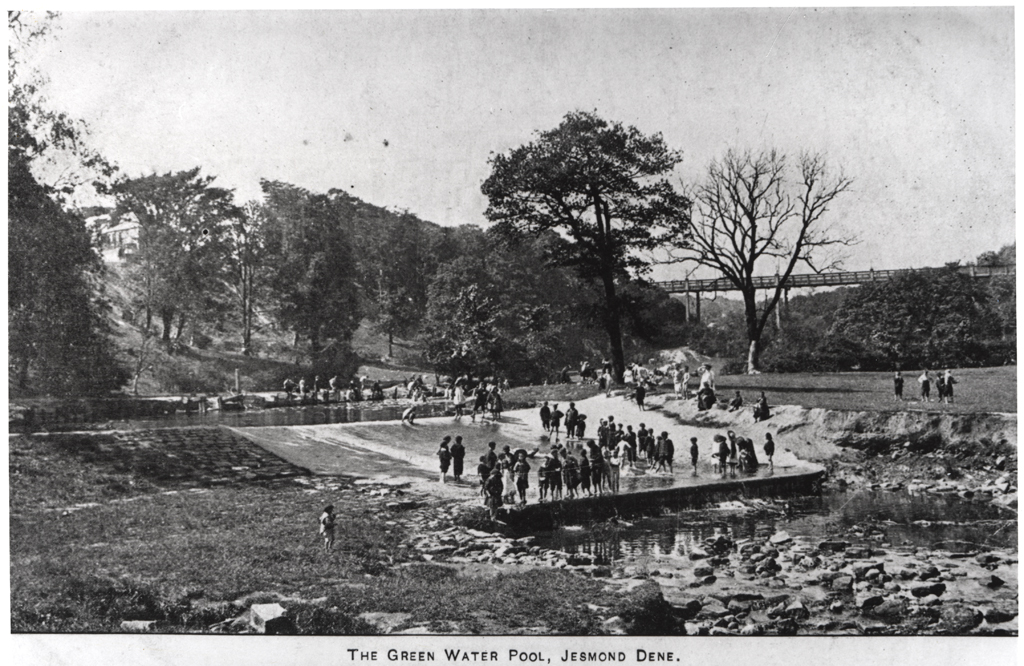
Green Water Pool in Jesmond Vale, 1903

The earliest historical reference to Jesmond as a site of residence dates to the late 12th century. Jesmond then was barely a village, and under the rule and protection of the barony of Ellingham. Jesmond Vale was primarily an agricultural area until the middle of the 19th Century. In 1846, the area had amassed a population of 386 people. During this time the town transitioned from an agricultural economy to industry, and contained a number of closely packed terrace houses. In the 1960s, there was an extensive slum demolition in the area. The vale has been prioritised for parkland, allotments and routes used by recreational walkers.

=== Lost village ===
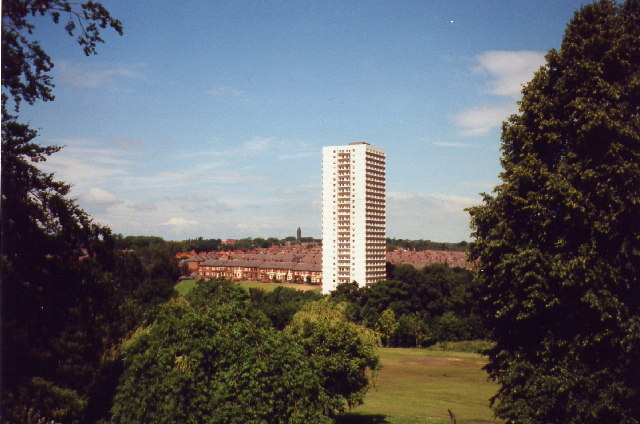
The tower block

The old village of Jesmond Vale used to sit in the bottom of the Ouseburn Valley, surrounded by fields. The village had three pubs, a farm and a mill beside the river. The remains of the mill can still be seen and the lea that fed it can be traced back to the mill dam at Greenwater Pool. Originally a corn mill, it was later adapted to grind flint for use as glaze in the pottery industry.

The bulk of the old village was demolished in the 1960s when the Vale was earmarked for redevelopment. Of the three pubs, only the Bluebell Inn survives. Much of the housing was replaced by Vale House, a residential tower block of 28 storeys and the second tallest building in Newcastle upon Tyne.

=== Cradlewell bypass ===
In the 1990s an ambitious road project bypassed the Cradlewell area of Jesmond, replacing the steep gradients of Benton Bank and joining Jesmond Road with the Coast Road. In order to build it several ancient trees were cut down at the northern end of Jesmond Vale. Environmental activists from across the United Kingdom protested against this action by constructing tree houses and camping in the tree-tops. This activity delayed construction.

Prior to construction a large concrete pillar was built at Benton Bank as a test pillar. Even though it was no longer needed it remained there for some 20 years before it was finally removed.
