= Cradlewell =

Coordinates: 54.988°N 1.592°W

- Location within Tyne and Wear
- OS grid reference: NZ261660
  - London: 242 miles (389 km)
- Metropolitan borough: Newcastle upon Tyne
- Metropolitan county: Tyne and Wear
- Region: North East
- Country: England
- Sovereign state: United Kingdom
- Post town: NEWCASTLE UPON TYNE
- Postcode district: NE2
- Dialling code: 0191
- Police: Northumbria
- Fire: Tyne and Wear
- Ambulance: North East
- UK Parliament: Newcastle upon Tyne Central

Cradlewell is an area within Jesmond, Newcastle upon Tyne, England. It is most noted for its spired church and its public house, 'The Cradlewell' which opened in 1904 and later closed, for conversion to a hotel & restaurant. It developed as the main road crossing point of the steep Ouseburn valley. Jesmond Dene is close by.

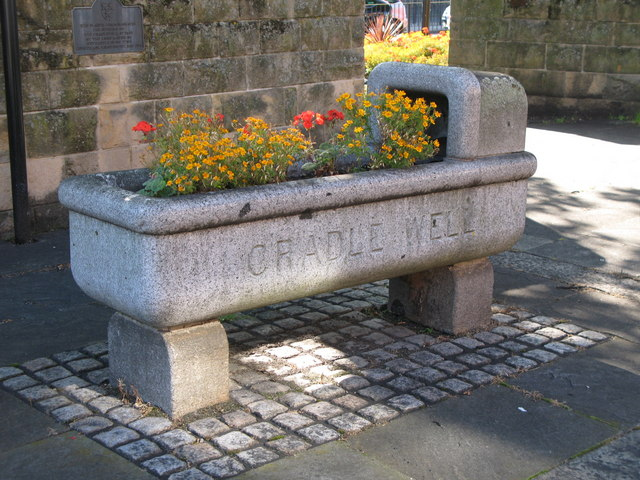
The 'Cradle Well' horse trough

The name may simply be from a cradle shaped horse trough situated at the edge of Jesmond Road in a prominent position.

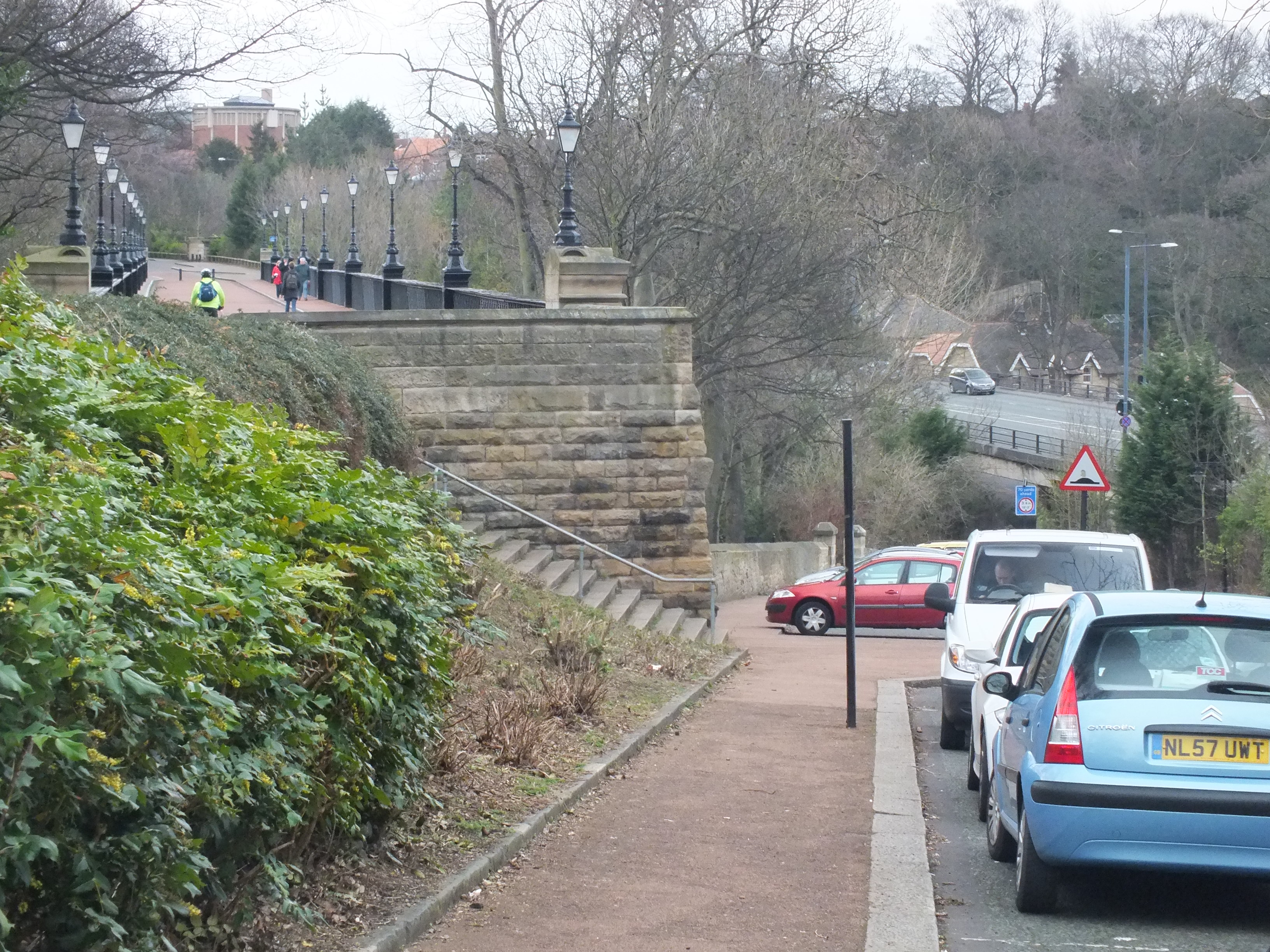
Old Armstrong Bridge, left, with the new bypass beyond

The historic Armstrong Bridge emerges into Cradlewell with Jesmond Dene to the north and Jesmond Vale to the south of the bridge.

In 1993 work began on a bypass for the Cradlewell area, replacing the very steep Benton Bank as the main thoroughfare. It joined the A1058 Coast Road with the Central Motorway after much protest from people who were opposed to cutting down so many ancient trees. There were tree-top demonstrations that held up the construction for a long time.
