= 2026 Gateshead Council election =

2026 English local government election

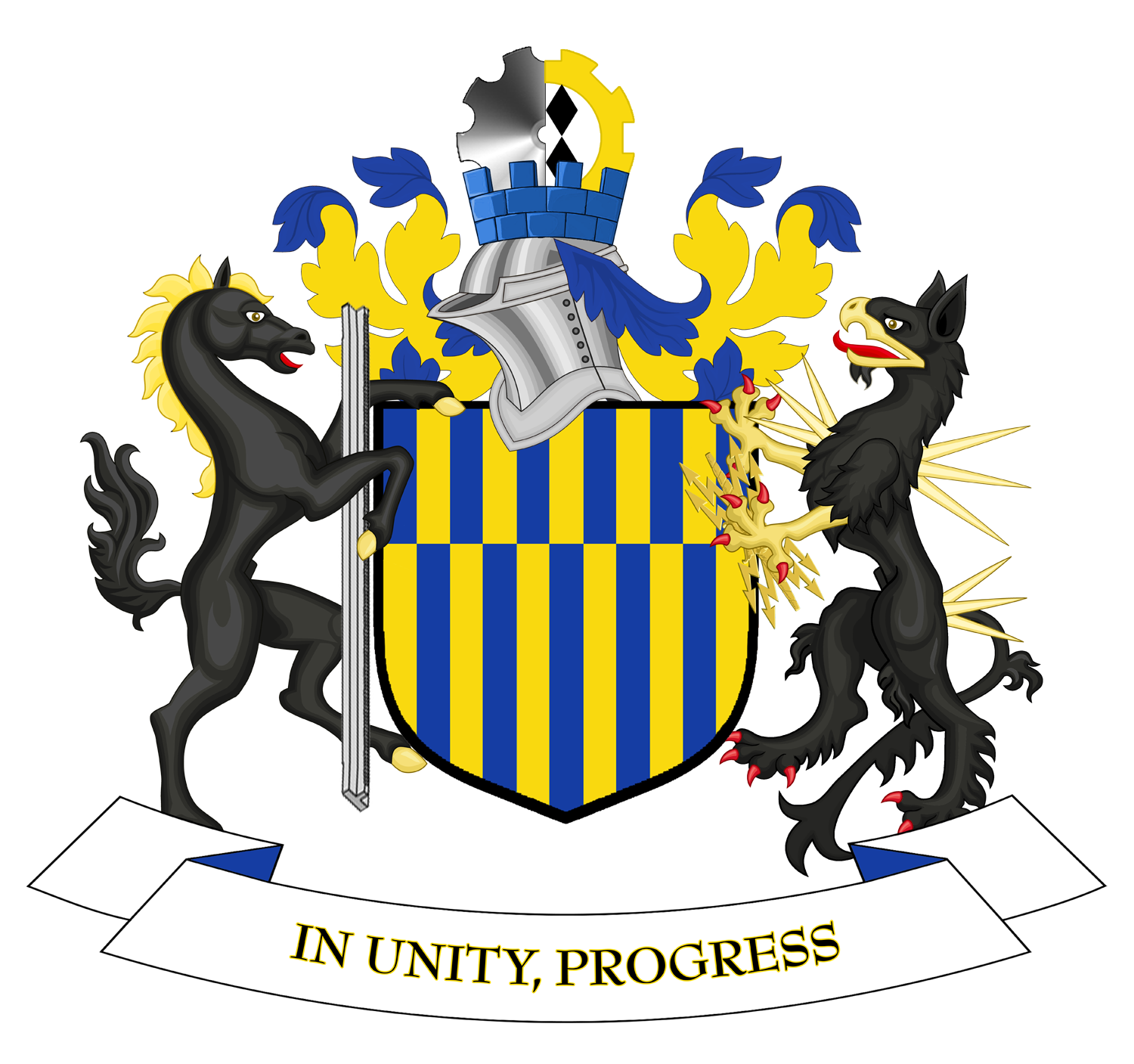
- 7 May 2026

All 66 seats to Gateshead Council 34 seats needed for a majority
- Registered: 143,805
- Turnout: 65,410; 45.5%

	First party	Second party	Third party
Leader	Nick Allan (Note: Appointed group leader after election, Reform having held no seats prior to it.)	Martin Gannon defeated	Ron Beadle
Party	Reform	Labour	Liberal Democrats
Last election	0 seats, 0.6%	48 seats, 49.5%	18 seats, 25.6%
Seats before	0	44 (Note: Including the two vacant seats in Windy Nook & Whitehills last held by Labour (Tom Graham, who died in January 2026, and Jim Turnbull, who died in March 2026).)	18
Seats won	38	12	13
Seats after	38	12	13
Seat change	▲38	▼36	▼5
Popular vote	67,437	49,614	37,353
Percentage	37.05%	27.26%	20.52%
Swing	▲36.44%	▼22.21%	▼5.06%
	Fourth party	Fifth party
Party	Green	Independent
Last election	0 seats, 9.7%	0 seats, 0.8%
Seats before	0	2
Seats won	3	0
Seats after	3	0
Seat change	▲3	▼2
Popular vote	24,667	323
Percentage	13.55%	0.18%
Swing	▲3.87%	▼0.65%
Leader before election
Martin Gannon
Labour
Leader after election
Nick Allan
Reform

The 2026 Gateshead Council election was held on 7 May 2026, alongside the other local elections across the United Kingdom on the same day. All 66 seats across 22 wards were up for election, following a review of ward boundaries by the Local Government Boundary Commission for England (LGBCE).

Prior to the election, the council had been under Labour majority control since its creation in 1974. At the election, Reform UK, which held no seats on the council prior to the election, won 38 seats, giving them an overall majority. The incumbent Labour leader of the council, Martin Gannon, lost his seat. After the election, Reform chose Nick Allan to be its new group leader. He was formally appointed as the new leader of the council at the subsequent annual council meeting on 29 May 2026.

== Background ==
In 2024, Labour retained control of the council.

== Council composition ==
After 2024 election		Before 2026 election	
Party	Seats	Party	Seats
Labour	48	Labour	44
Liberal Democrats	18	Liberal Democrats	18
Independent	0	Independent	2
Vacant	N/A	Vacant	2

Changes 2024–2026:

- June 2024: Bob Goldsworthy (Labour) dies – by-election held September 2024
- September 2024:
  - Robert Waugh (Labour) wins by-election
  - Sonya Hawkins (Liberal Democrats) resigns – by-election held October 2024
  - Jane McCoid (Labour) leaves party to sit as an independent
- October 2024: Susan Craig (Liberal Democrats) wins by-election
- June 2025: Robert Waugh (Labour) leaves party to sit as an independent
- January 2026: Tom Graham (Labour) dies – seat left vacant until 2026 election
- March 2026: Jim Turnbull (Labour) dies – seat left vacant until 2026 election

== Election result ==
Council composition

2026 Gateshead Metropolitan Borough Council election
Party	Candidates	Seats	Gains	Losses	Net gain/loss	Seats %	Votes %	Votes	+/−
Reform	66	38	N/A	N/A	▲38	57.6	37.0	67,437	+36.4
Liberal Democrats	62	13	N/A	N/A	▼5	19.7	20.5	37,353	–5.1
Labour	66	12	N/A	N/A	▼34	18.2	27.3	49,614	–22.2
Green	60	3	N/A	N/A	▲3	4.5	13.6	24,667	+3.9
Conservative	14	0	N/A	N/A	Steady	0.0	1.3	2,295	–10.2
Independent	2	0	N/A	N/A	▼2	0.0	0.2	323	–0.6
TUSC	5	0	N/A	N/A	Steady	0.0	0.2	303	–0.9
Save Us Now	1	0	N/A	N/A	Steady	0.0	<0.1	34	–0.1

== Ward results ==
=== Birtley North & Lamesley ===
Birtley North & Lamesley (3 seats)
Party	Candidate	Votes	%
Reform	Andrea Graham	1,354	49.7
Reform	Steven Mullins	1,284	47.1
Reform	Michael Robinson	1,258	46.1
Labour	Judith Turner*	895	32.8
Labour	Robin Costello	735	27.0
Labour	David Lowes	691	25.3
Liberal Democrats	Abbie Batey	402	14.7
Liberal Democrats	Andrew Bex	374	13.7
Green	Joe Painter	370	13.6
Green	Jason Price	314	11.5
Liberal Democrats	Cameron Wallace	293	10.7
Conservative	John Dawson	209	7.7
Turnout		2,990	43.2
Registered electors		6,926	
Reform win (new seat)			
Reform win (new seat)			
Reform win (new seat)			

=== Birtley South ===
Birtley South (3 seats)
Party	Candidate	Votes	%
Reform	Sandra Pickering	1,031	41.1
Reform	William Pay	1,021	40.7
Reform	Martin Turnbull	980	39.1
Liberal Democrats	Paul Elliott*	897	35.8
Liberal Democrats	Joe Sowerby*	793	31.6
Liberal Democrats	Lauran Sowerby	723	28.8
Labour	Michael Hall	504	20.1
Labour	Kenneth Jamieson	436	17.4
Labour	Shaun Tumelty	419	16.7
Green	Stephen Brownless	404	16.1
Independent	Michelle Hepburn	173	6.9
Conservative	John Gardiner	139	5.5
Turnout		2,756	41.5
Registered electors		6,639	
Reform win (new seat)			
Reform win (new seat)			
Reform win (new seat)			

=== Blaydon ===
Blaydon (3 seats)
Party	Candidate	Votes	%	±%
Reform	Steve Campion	1,185	46.6	N/A
Reform	Gillian Jackson	1,159	45.6	N/A
Reform	Pedro Santos	1,018	40.1	N/A
Labour	Malcolm Brain*	903	35.5	−25.3
Labour	Stephen Ronchetti*	862	33.9	−26.9
Labour	Lee-Ann Moir*	742	29.2	−31.6
Green	Alexander Mackay	381	15.0	+5.1
Green	Emma Short	380	15.0	+5.1
Green	Isa Wilson	319	12.6	+2.7
Liberal Democrats	Margaret Kelly	265	10.4	+0.3
Liberal Democrats	Joanne Stanton	207	8.1	−2.0
Liberal Democrats	Neil Wilde	203	8.0	−2.1
Turnout		2,741	39.1	+9.6
Registered electors		7,017		
Reform gain from Labour				
Reform gain from Labour				
Reform gain from Labour				

=== Bridges ===
Bridges (3 seats)
Party	Candidate	Votes	%	±%
Green	Rachel Cabral	842	39.0	+6.3
Green	Mark Gorman	754	34.9	+2.2
Green	Melissa Harker	739	34.2	+1.5
Reform	Peter Charlton	629	29.1	N/A
Reform	Leon Dobie	580	26.8	N/A
Reform	Shane Irwin	569	26.3	N/A
Labour	Chris Beer	441	20.4	−28.6
Labour	Linda Cook	426	19.7	−29.3
Labour	Alistair Bassett	423	19.6	−29.4
Liberal Democrats	Jonathan Aibi	403	18.7	+11.1
Liberal Democrats	Luisa Scott	378	17.5	+9.9
Liberal Democrats	Zahra Hakim	297	13.7	+6.1
Turnout		2,278	41.4	+10.6
Registered electors		5,509		
Green gain from Labour				
Green gain from Independent				
Green gain from Labour				

=== Chopwell & Rowlands Gill ===
Chopwell & Rowlands Gill (3 seats)
Party	Candidate	Votes	%	±%
Labour	Lynne Caffrey*	1,504	48.9	−22.0
Labour	Michael McNestry*	1,410	45.8	−25.1
Labour	Jamie Park*	1,395	45.3	−25.6
Reform	Linda McFarlane	1,125	36.6	N/A
Reform	Lee Wood	1,018	33.1	N/A
Reform	Majead Farsi	948	30.8	N/A
Green	Howard Schofield	417	13.5	N/A
Green	Josh Morland	350	11.4	N/A
Green	Jennifer Young	309	10.0	N/A
Conservative	Matthew Davies	286	9.3	−6.2
Liberal Democrats	Victoria Anderson	242	7.9	−5.7
Liberal Democrats	Jean Callender	229	7.4	−6.2
Turnout		3,391	49.2	+8.9
Registered electors		6,899		
Labour hold				
Labour hold				
Labour hold				

=== Chowdene ===
Chowdene (3 seats)
Party	Candidate	Votes	%	±%
Reform	Neil Carpenter	1,085	41.2	+27.4
Reform	Andrew Wallace	1,049	39.8	+26.0
Reform	Edwin Snaith	1,022	38.8	+25.0
Labour	Keith Wood*	754	28.6	−21.8
Labour	Josh Kemp	700	26.6	−23.8
Liberal Democrats	Roy Alexander	672	25.5	+8.9
Labour	Caitlin Mcisaac	650	24.7	−25.7
Liberal Democrats	Catherine Knell	641	24.3	+7.7
Liberal Democrats	Emma Robinson	638	24.2	+7.6
Green	Ruth Grant	368	14.0	+8.2
Green	Dev Patel	267	10.1	+4.2
Conservative	Perry Wilson	177	6.1	−3.7
TUSC	Sam Morden	62	2.4	N/A
Turnout		2,910	45.7	+11.9
Registered electors		6,363		
Reform gain from Labour				
Reform gain from Labour				
Reform gain from Labour				

=== Crawcrook & Greenside ===
Crawcrook & Greenside (3 seats)
Party	Candidate	Votes	%	±%
Labour	Kathryn Henderson*	1,405	42.4	−11.9
Labour	Kathleen McCartney*	1,381	41.6	−12.7
Labour	Shaun Edge	1,268	38.2	−16.1
Reform	John Barron	1,112	33.5	N/A
Reform	Keith Blackett	1,089	32.8	N/A
Reform	Peter Gray	991	29.9	N/A
Green	Jemma Healey	680	20.5	−0.6
Green	Pat Chanse	646	19.5	−1.6
Green	Hugo Fearnley	638	19.2	−1.9
Conservative	Christopher Coxon	295	8.9	−0.9
Liberal Democrats	Amelia Ord	248	7.5	+2.9
Liberal Democrats	David Randall	198	6.0	+1.4
Turnout		3,595	51.5	+12.0
Registered electors		6,978		
Labour hold				
Labour hold				
Labour hold				

=== Deckham ===
Deckham (3 seats)
Party	Candidate	Votes	%	±%
Reform	Alan Brown	1,042	41.8	N/A
Reform	Patricia Shield	956	38.4	N/A
Reform	Craig Heathcote	890	35.7	N/A
Labour	Bernadette Oliphant*	832	33.4	−20.1
Labour	Martin Gannon*	819	32.9	−20.6
Labour	Leigh Kirton*	781	31.3	−22.2
Green	Roisin Taylor	506	20.3	+5.0
Green	Sam Grinsell	486	19.5	+4.2
Green	Paul Stewart	442	17.7	+2.4
Liberal Democrats	Michaela McCaugherty	260	10.4	−2.2
Liberal Democrats	Stephen McCaugherty	210	8.4	−4.2
Conservative	Barry Flux	191	7.7	−4.6
TUSC	Norman Hall	63	2.5	−3.8
Turnout		2,683	42.3	+10.6
Registered electors		6,340		
Reform gain from Labour				
Reform gain from Labour				
Reform gain from Labour				

=== Dunston Hill & Whickham East ===
Dunston Hill & Whickham East (3 seats)
Party	Candidate	Votes	%	±%
Reform	Ronnie Jackson	1,232	40.7	N/A
Reform	Nick Allan	1,215	40.1	N/A
Liberal Democrats	Peter Maughan*	1,146	37.8	−10.9
Reform	Jackie Kinnaird	1,134	37.4	N/A
Liberal Democrats	Jason Meecham	998	33.0	−15.7
Liberal Democrats	Lynne Henderson-Lowe	984	32.5	−16.2
Labour	Yvonne Dodds	443	14.6	−16.4
Green	Mary Blanchflower	436	14.4	+4.7
Labour	Joseph March	379	12.5	−18.5
Labour	James Watson	351	11.6	−19.4
Green	Sarah-Jane Homer	340	11.2	+1.5
Green	Matthew McManus	276	9.1	−0.6
Conservative	Aidan Smith	118	3.9	−3.3
Save Us Now	Graham Steele	34	1.1	−2.3
Turnout		3,212	48.5	+11.8
Registered electors		6,617		
Reform gain from Liberal Democrats				
Reform gain from Liberal Democrats				
Liberal Democrats hold				

=== Dunston Teams & Riverside ===
Dunston Teams & Riverside (3 seats)
Party	Candidate	Votes	%
Reform	Graham Keating	890	40.2
Reform	Alison Porritt	834	37.7
Reform	Ronald Maraj	809	36.6
Labour	Brenda Clelland*	781	35.3
Labour	Dot Burnett*	703	31.8
Labour	Gary Haley*	646	29.2
Green	Diane Cadman	514	23.2
Green	Gosia Balwierz	470	21.2
Green	Andrew Jay	451	20.4
Liberal Democrats	Frank Hindle	165	7.5
Liberal Democrats	Roger Lee	136	6.1
Liberal Democrats	Zoë Meecham	136	6.1
Conservative	Shadrach Esene	105	4.7
Turnout		2,372	40.2
Registered electors		5,903	
Reform win (new seat)			
Reform win (new seat)			
Reform win (new seat)			

=== Felling ===
Felling (3 seats)
Party	Candidate	Votes	%	±%
Reform	Andy Dine	895	45.6	N/A
Reform	Derek Finch	871	44.4	N/A
Reform	Garry Thompson	831	42.4	N/A
Labour	Sonya Dickie*	619	31.6	−31.0
Labour	George Kasfikis*	580	29.6	−33.0
Green	Ash Mclean	491	25.0	+12.3
Labour	Hugh Kelly	487	24.8	−37.8
Green	Liam Snowball	393	20.0	+7.3
Liberal Democrats	Gareth Cooper	216	11.0	−0.4
Liberal Democrats	David Fawcett	209	10.7	−0.7
Liberal Democrats	Sophia Beadle	203	10.4	−1.0
Conservative	Chrystian Rengifo	87	4.4	−8.9
Turnout		2,220	37.8	+11.3
Registered electors		5,880		
Reform gain from Labour				
Reform gain from Labour				
Reform gain from Labour				

=== High Fell ===
High Fell (3 seats)
Party	Candidate	Votes	%	±%
Reform	Arthur Boylin	1,133	48.5	N/A
Reform	Danielle Cavanagh	1,098	47.0	N/A
Reform	Sidney Laws	1,071	45.9	N/A
Labour	Judith Gibson*	718	30.7	−25.9
Labour	Kathryn Walker*	679	29.1	−27.5
Labour	Barry Turnbull*	624	26.7	−29.9
Green	Joseph Anyanwu	346	14.8	+7.1
Green	Catherine O'Donovan	325	13.9	+6.2
Green	Gabriel Runibstein	272	11.6	+3.9
Liberal Democrats	Andrew Welsh	231	9.9	−1.9
Liberal Democrats	Shakuntala Beadle	224	9.6	−2.2
Liberal Democrats	Leonard Bell	197	8.4	−3.4
TUSC	Elaine Brunskill	89	3.8	−6.6
Turnout		2,483	37.0	+10.5
Registered electors		6,706		
Reform gain from Labour				
Reform gain from Labour				
Reform gain from Labour				

=== Lobley Hill & Bensham ===
Lobley Hill & Bensham (3 seats)
Party	Candidate	Votes	%	±%
Reform	Michael Lamport	1,224	43.6	N/A
Reform	Michelle Merrin	1,191	42.4	N/A
Reform	David Simpson	1,155	41.1	N/A
Labour	Kevin Dodds*	924	32.9	−25.2
Labour	Crystal Hicks	876	31.2	−26.9
Labour	Shinu Yohannan	751	26.7	−31.4
Green	Andy Redfern	440	15.7	+1.2
Green	Harry Farncombe	426	15.2	+0.7
Liberal Democrats	Corrina Mulholland	419	14.9	+1.4
Green	Tom Whyman	376	13.4	−1.1
Liberal Democrats	Michael Ruddy	332	11.8	−1.7
Liberal Democrats	Jonny Witts	315	11.2	−2.3
Turnout		2,976	44.8	+12.9
Registered electors		6,640		
Reform gain from Labour				
Reform gain from Labour				
Reform gain from Labour				

=== Low Fell ===
Low Fell (3 seats)
Party	Candidate	Votes	%	±%
Liberal Democrats	Ron Beadle*	1,968	53.0	−0.1
Liberal Democrats	Daniel Duggan*	1,728	46.6	−6.5
Liberal Democrats	Dawn Welsh*	1,678	45.2	−7.9
Reform	John Atkinson	880	23.7	N/A
Reform	Iain Henderson	802	21.6	N/A
Reform	Arthur Murray	757	20.4	N/A
Green	Neil Grant	640	17.2	+7.5
Labour	Shaun Dunlop	590	15.9	−12.8
Labour	Robert Taylor	522	14.1	−14.6
Labour	Jerome Ruddick	488	13.2	−15.5
Green	George Poxon	464	12.5	+2.8
Green	Deacon Robson	439	11.8	+2.1
Conservative	Jonathan Dawson	134	3.6	−2.0
TUSC	Simon Morden	41	1.1	−1.4
Turnout		3,897	59.5	+11.2
Registered electors		6,546		
Liberal Democrats hold				
Liberal Democrats hold				
Liberal Democrats hold				

=== Pelaw Heworth & Bill Quay ===
Pelaw Heworth & Bill Quay (3 seats)
Party	Candidate	Votes	%
Liberal Democrats	Ian Patterson*	1,101	40.1
Liberal Democrats	Amanda Wintcher*	1,014	37.0
Liberal Democrats	John Diston*	1,011	36.9
Reform	James Charlton	951	34.7
Reform	Caroline Murphy	936	34.1
Reform	Michael Vinton	874	31.9
Labour	Emma Harrison	445	16.2
Labour	Amy Lowes	411	15.0
Green	Nicholas Boldrini	410	14.9
Labour	Sam Grist	403	14.7
Green	Joel Cartwright	319	11.6
Green	Nick Ng	287	10.5
Conservative	Daniel McFadyen	67	2.4
Turnout		2,898	46.2
Registered electors		6,271	
Liberal Democrats win (new seat)			
Liberal Democrats win (new seat)			
Liberal Democrats win (new seat)			

=== Ryton, Crookhill & Stella ===
Ryton, Crookhill & Stella (3 seats)
Party	Candidate	Votes	%	±%
Labour	Christopher Buckley*	1,417	39.8	−5.4
Labour	Becky Skoyles	1,313	36.9	−8.3
Labour	Eleanor Baggaley	1,273	35.8	−9.4
Reform	Paul Turnbull	1,153	32.4	N/A
Reform	Craig Waite	1,112	31.3	N/A
Reform	Deborah English	1,070	30.1	N/A
Liberal Democrats	Stephen Kelly	865	24.3	−4.2
Liberal Democrats	Jack Muers	641	18.0	−10.5
Liberal Democrats	Shan-Louise Simpson	566	15.9	−12.6
Green	Ollie Hemstock	420	11.8	+1.6
Green	Gemma Turnbull	414	11.6	+1.4
Green	Ralf Russow	380	10.7	+0.5
TUSC	Ros Cooper	48	1.3	−1.3
Turnout		3,785	50.5	+9.4
Registered electors		7,494		
Labour hold				
Labour hold				
Labour hold				

=== Saltwell ===
Saltwell (3 seats)
Party	Candidate	Votes	%	±%
Labour	John Adams*	1,149	41.3	−10.9
Labour	Denise Robson*	1,102	39.7	−12.5
Labour	Stephen Gibson	993	35.7	−16.5
Green	Owain Curtis	672	24.2	+15.1
Green	Graham Hankinson	603	21.7	+12.6
Liberal Democrats	Leanne Brand*	601	21.6	−10.2
Green	Simon James	572	20.6	+11.5
Reform	David Ayre	570	20.5	N/A
Reform	David Roberts	521	18.7	N/A
Reform	David Prior	490	17.6	N/A
Liberal Democrats	Jamie Rickelton	465	16.7	−15.1
Liberal Democrats	Edita Petrylaite	431	15.5	−16.3
Conservative	Ayo Akin	168	6.0	−0.9
Turnout		2,935	43.8	+9.4
Registered electors		6,707		
Labour hold				
Labour hold				
Labour gain from Liberal Democrats				

=== Wardley & Leam Lane ===
Wardley & Leam Lane (3 seats)
Party	Candidate	Votes	%	±%
Reform	Gavin Brierley	1,258	50.7	N/A
Reform	Fiona Pearce	1,240	50.0	N/A
Reform	Neil Whittle	1,175	47.4	N/A
Labour	Jill Green*	1,004	40.5	−26.1
Labour	Sharron Potts*	773	31.2	−35.4
Labour	Peter Ridden	740	29.9	−36.7
Green	Maria Dynes	328	13.2	N/A
Liberal Democrats	Catherine Douglas	299	12.1	−5.7
Green	Carrie Poon	262	10.6	N/A
Liberal Democrats	Jordan Ridehalgh	208	8.4	−9.4
Independent	Michael Johnson	150	6.1	N/A
Turnout		2,786	44.0	+10.6
Registered electors		6,328		
Reform gain from Labour				
Reform gain from Labour				
Reform gain from Labour				

=== Whickham North & Swalwell ===
Whickham North & Swalwell (3 seats)
Party	Candidate	Votes	%
Liberal Democrats	Peter Craig*	1,326	46.3
Liberal Democrats	Christopher Ord*	1,295	45.2
Liberal Democrats	Susan Craig*	1,262	44.1
Reform	Lynne Chatt	1,062	37.1
Reform	Graeme Wake	952	33.2
Reform	Sebastian Ziri-Sayle	855	29.8
Labour	Jeff Bowe	361	12.6
Labour	Jennifer Peace	316	11.0
Labour	Charles Whittle	275	9.6
Green	Ruby Brown	262	9.1
Green	Iona Brown	261	9.1
Green	Catriona Sibert-Peach	219	7.6
Conservative	Lynn Robinson	148	5.2
Turnout		3,030	47.2
Registered electors		6,389	
Liberal Democrats win (new seat)			
Liberal Democrats win (new seat)			
Liberal Democrats win (new seat)			

=== Whickham South & Sunniside ===
Whickham South & Sunniside (3 seats)
Party	Candidate	Votes	%	±%
Liberal Democrats	Marilynn Ord*	1,711	53.0	+8.2
Liberal Democrats	Jonathan Wallace*	1,692	52.4	+7.6
Liberal Democrats	Jonathan Mohammed*	1,572	48.7	+3.9
Reform	Mike Porritt	986	30.6	N/A
Reform	Lindsay Atkinson	939	29.1	N/A
Reform	Wendy Prior	893	27.7	N/A
Labour	Michael Pickering	360	11.2	−28.7
Labour	Alex Geddes	359	11.1	−28.8
Labour	Nicola March	332	10.3	−29.6
Green	Joseph Gerrard	243	7.5	+2.3
Green	Mary Winn	226	7.0	+1.8
Green	Ian Roper	196	6.1	+0.9
Conservative	Christopher Higham	171	5.3	−4.9
Turnout		3,423	54.8	+12.1
Registered electors		6,250		
Liberal Democrats hold				
Liberal Democrats hold				
Liberal Democrats hold				

=== Windy Nook & Whitehills ===
Windy Nook & Whitehills (3 seats)
Party	Candidate	Votes	%	±%
Reform	Jeff Smart	1,240	53.8	N/A
Reform	Julie Smart	1,203	52.2	N/A
Reform	Hillary Thompson	1,187	51.5	N/A
Labour	Rachel Hart*	644	27.9	−27.8
Labour	Joanne Wilson	598	25.9	−29.8
Labour	James Green	596	25.9	−29.8
Green	David Tones	319	13.8	+4.5
Green	James Cummings	256	11.1	+1.8
Liberal Democrats	Susan Walker	253	11.0	−6.7
Green	Lee Turner	236	10.2	+0.9
Liberal Democrats	Christine Craig	213	9.2	−8.5
Liberal Democrats	John Sistron	171	7.4	−10.3
Turnout		2,498	39.9	+10.1
Registered electors		6,259		
Reform gain from Labour				
Reform gain from Labour				
Reform gain from Labour				

=== Winlaton & High Spen ===
Winlaton & High Spen (3 seats)
Party	Candidate	Votes	%	±%
Reform	Steven Tweddle	1,486	47.2	N/A
Reform	Col Daughtry	1,457	46.3	N/A
Reform	James Wright	1,410	44.8	N/A
Labour	Julie Simpson*	1,113	35.4	−21.8
Labour	Pamela Burns*	1,060	33.7	−23.5
Labour	Maria Hall*	1,040	33.1	−24.1
Green	Cheryl Dixon	390	12.4	−2.3
Green	Daniel Clayton	374	11.9	−2.8
Green	Steven Dixon	307	9.8	−4.9
Liberal Democrats	David Potts	292	9.3	+1.5
Liberal Democrats	Lynda Wilde	278	8.8	+1.0
Liberal Democrats	Robinson Stanaway	228	7.2	−0.6
Turnout		3,551	49.7	+12.7
Registered electors		7,144		
Reform gain from Labour				
Reform gain from Labour				
Reform gain from Labour				

== By-elections ==
=== High Fell ===
High Fell by-election: 9 July 2026 Resignation of Danielle Cavanagh (Reform)
Party	Candidate	Votes	%	±%
Reform	Lindsay Atkinson	564	40.1	−4.9
Labour	Kathryn Walker	559	39.7	+11.2
Liberal Democrats	Jonathan Aibi	98	7.0	−2.2
Conservative	Barry Malcolm Flux	79	5.6	N/A
Green	Lee Turner	71	5.0	−8.7
TUSC	Elaine Brunskill	36	2.6	−0.9
Turnout		1,408	21.0	−16.0
Rejected ballots		1	0.1	
Registered electors		6,704		
Reform hold		Swing	▼8.1	
