= John Johnstone (architect) =

British architect

John Johnstone (1818–1884) was an architect who was responsible for the design of many public buildings in North East England in the mid 19th century.

== Career ==
Born in Kilmarnock to a Dunfermline contractor, Johnstone trained as an architect before becoming clerk of works to the partnership of George Gilbert Scott and William Bonython Moffatt at Spring Gardens in London. He moved to Newcastle upon Tyne in the mid-19th century, where he went into partnership with William Alexander Knowles. In 1863 he won a competition held for the design of a new town hall for Gateshead which was built between 1867 and 1870. Elected as the President of the Northern Architectural Association in 1875, he died in Newcastle upon Tyne in 1884.

== Works ==
Johnstone's major works included:

- Berwick Corn Exchange (1858)
- Newcastle Town Hall (1863)
- Hexham Town Hall (1866)
- Dumfries Town Hall (1866) (destroyed in a fire in 1908)
- Gateshead Town Hall (1870)

== Sources ==
- Taylor, Simon; Lovie, David B (2004). Gateshead. Architecture in a changing English urban landscape. London: English Heritage. ISBN 1 873592 76 0.
