= Newcastle Civic Centre =

Municipal building in Newcastle upon Tyne, England

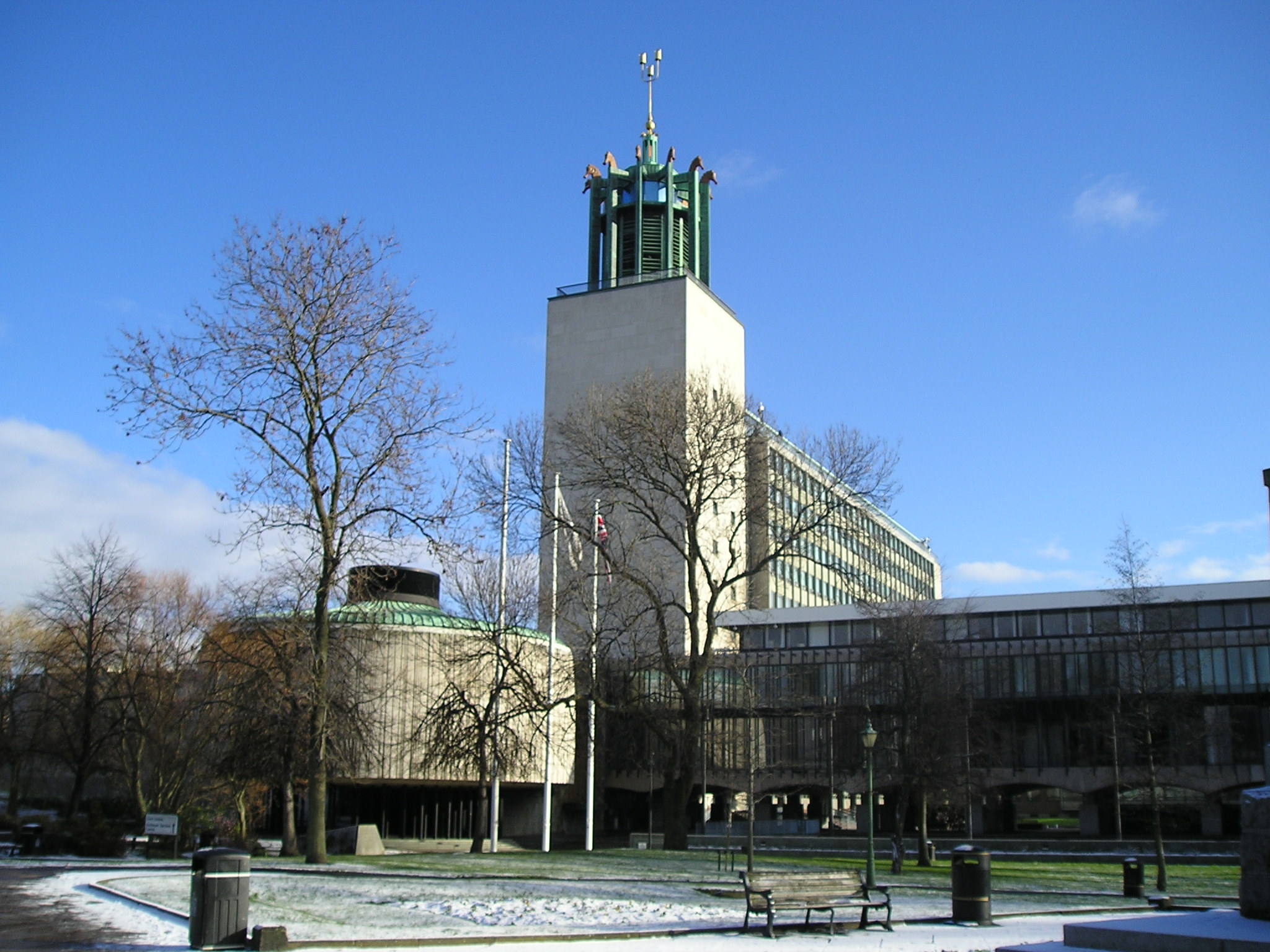
- Newcastle Civic Centre

General information
- Location: Newcastle upon Tyne, Civic Centre; Barras Bridge; Haymarket; Newcastle upon Tyne
- Coordinates: 54.9790°N 1.6109°W
- Completed: 1967
- Inaugurated: 14 November 1968
- Owner: Newcastle City Council

Height
- Height: 200 ft (61 m)

Design and construction
- Architect: George Kenyon
- Designations

Listed Building – Grade II*
- Official name: Civic Centre
- Designated: 16 November 1995
- Reference no.: 1242692

Newcastle Civic Centre is a municipal building in the Haymarket area of Newcastle upon Tyne, England. Designed by George Kenyon, the centre was built for Newcastle City Council in 1967 and formally opened by King Olav V of Norway on 14 November 1968. It is a Grade II* listed building and is the joint eighth-tallest building in the city, standing at 200 feet (61 m).

== History ==
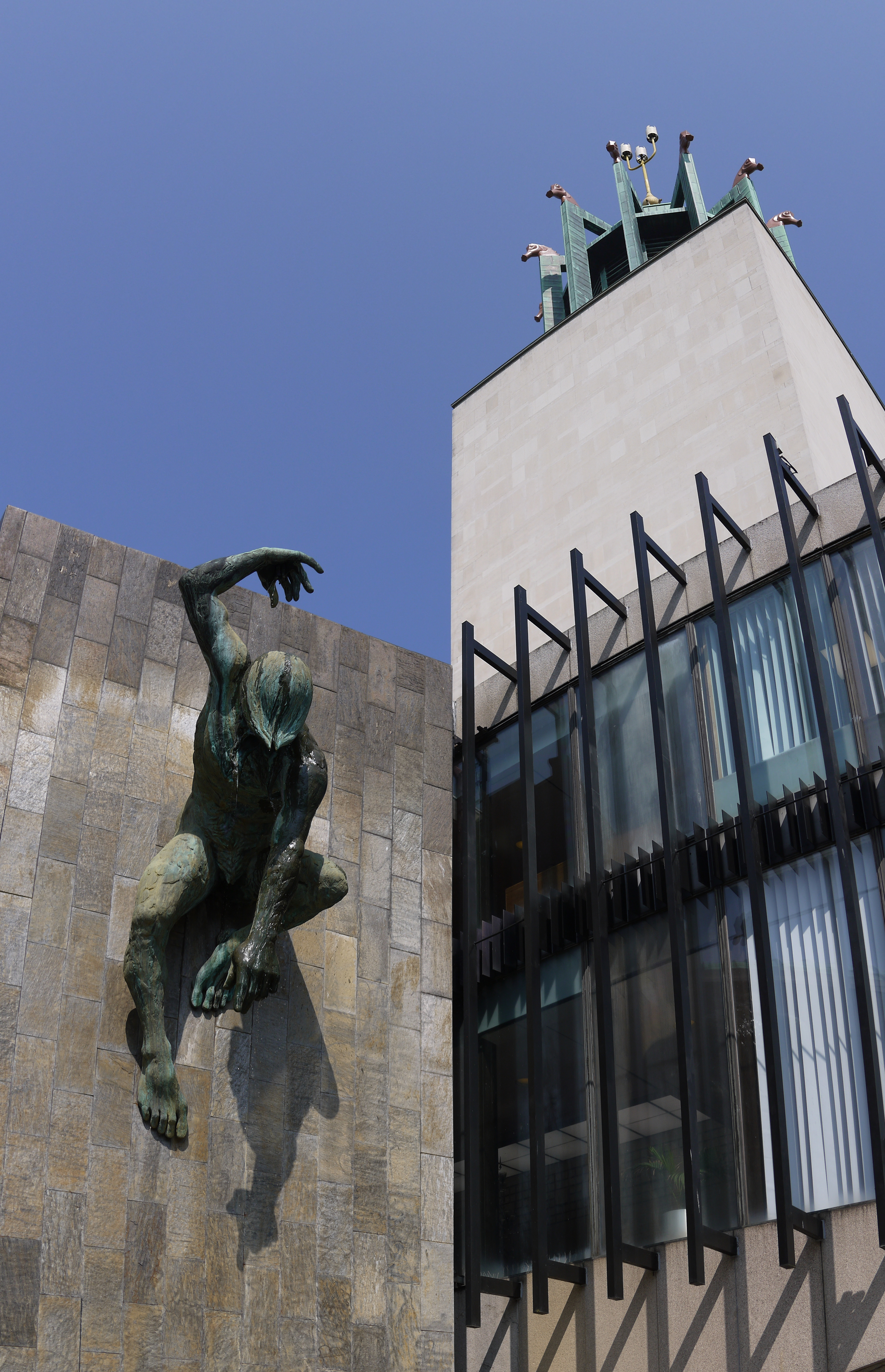
River God Tyne, with the seahorse heads on top of the tower in the background

The civic centre was commissioned to replace a Victorian Town Hall which stood in St Nicholas Square (between the Bigg Market and the Cloth Market). Plans to build a new city hall on the site at Barras Bridge had been proposed prior to the outbreak of the Second World War, to the point of holding an architectural competition, although these were halted by the war; and due to post-war restrictions on capital expenditure, it was not until August 1956 that authorisation to begin construction was granted. During the interim period, the demolition of houses and a former Eye Hospital on the intended site was implemented. The building was designed by the city architect, George Kenyon.

The construction work, which was undertaken by Sir Robert McAlpine, commenced on the building in May 1960, and the foundation stone was laid by the Lord Mayor, Alderman Mrs Gladys Robson, on 30 November 1960. The total construction cost was £4,855,000. The building was completed in 1967 and was formally opened by King Olav V of Norway on 14 November 1968. On 6 May 1977, the Civic Centre was visited by the 39th President of the United States Jimmy Carter, who delivered a speech famously containing the Geordie phrase "Howay the lads!" A stone commemorating the event was placed in the Civic Centre grounds.

The council leader's office was used as a filming location by a Japanese production team in 2014 for a drama set in 1960s Tokyo.

== Sculpture and art works ==
The Civic Centre is also notable for its modern sculptures, in particular the River God Tyne and Swans in Flight, both by David Wynne and the seahorses on the top of the tower by John Robert Murray McCheyne. The cashiers reception of the former rates hall, now the Customer Service Centre, has two abstract murals by Victor Pasmore. There were various other "works of fine art", including tapestries, murals and engraved glass screens, commissioned "under the overall supervision of the architect".

== See also ==
- Grade II* listed buildings in Tyne and Wear
- List of carillons of the British Isles
- Mansion House, Newcastle upon Tyne
