= List of tallest buildings and structures in Newcastle upon Tyne =

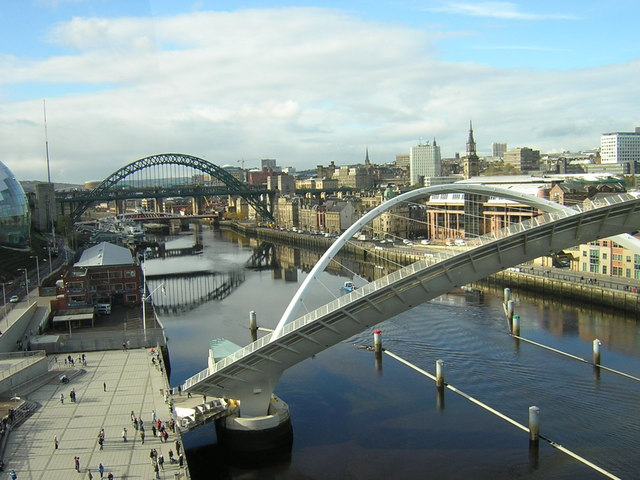
Many of the tallest buildings and structures in Newcastle can be found in the city centre, for example the Tyne Bridge at left above

This list of the tallest buildings and structures in Newcastle upon Tyne ranks skyscrapers and structures in Newcastle upon Tyne, England, UK, by height and doesn't include structures in neighbouring Gateshead. Only structures taller than 45 metres (148 ft) are listed below. Unlike other cities in the UK of its size, Newcastle upon Tyne doesn't have a particularly large number of highrise buildings and structures; the majority are residential tower blocks built in the mid-20th century.

St Nicholas' Cathedral, which was completed in 1448, held the title of the tallest building in Newcastle for 396 years until 1844, when St Mary's Cathedral succeeded it by a matter of metres. St Mary's Cathedral also held the title of the city's tallest building for 122 years. In 1966 the first modern building to exceed the height of Newcastle's two cathedrals became the tallest building in the city. Despite this, Shieldfield House held the title for only a two-year period when construction of the 28-storey Vale House was completed in 1968. Newcastle City Council granted planning permission in 2017 for an 82-metre-tall (269 ft) residential block to be called Hadrian's Tower on Rutherford Street in Newcastle city centre, which became the new tallest on its completion in 2020.

== Tallest buildings and structures ==
An equal sign (=) following a rank indicates the same height between two or more buildings.

Rank	Name	Use	Image	Height (m)	Height (ft)	Floors	Year	Notes
1	Hadrian's Tower, Rutherford Street	Residential		83	272	27	2020	
2	Vale House, Jesmond Vale	Residential		80	262	28	1968	
3=	Shieldfield House, Shieldfield	Residential		77	253	26	1966	
3=	Bewick Court	Residential		77	253	21	1970	
5	Cruddas Park House	Mixed		75	246	23	1969	
6	St Mary's Cathedral	Place of Worship		68	222	N/A	1844	
7	St James' Park	Football Stadium		64.5	213	N/A	2000	Originally opened as a ground in 1880; it is the largest cantilever structure in Europe.
8	Bank House, Pilgrim St	Office		63	208	14	2023	
9	St Nicholas' Cathedral	Place of Worship		62	203	N/A	1448	
10	All Saints' Church	Place of Worship		62	202	N/A	1796	
11=	Cale Cross	Office		61	200	18	1978	
11=	Civic Centre	Government		61	200	12	1967	
13	The View	Residential		60	194	17	2014	
14	Tyne Bridge (shared with Gateshead)	Bridge		59	194	N/A	1928	
15=	Vallum Court, Westgate Road	Residential		58	190	20	1965	
15=	Todds Nook, Westgate Road	Residential		58	190	20	1964	
15=	Westgate Court, Westgate Road	Residential		58	190	20	1964	
18	Adelaide House	Residential		55	180	19	1968	
19	Forth Banks Tower	Mixed		51	167	16	2009	
20	Gateshead Millennium Bridge (shared with Gateshead)	Bridge		50	165	N/A	2001	
21	Claremont Tower	University		48	157	12	1968	
22	Newcastle International Airport Control Tower	Control Tower		46	151	N/A	2006	
