= Old Town Hall, Gateshead =

Municipal building in Gateshead, Tyne and Wear, England

Old Town Hall
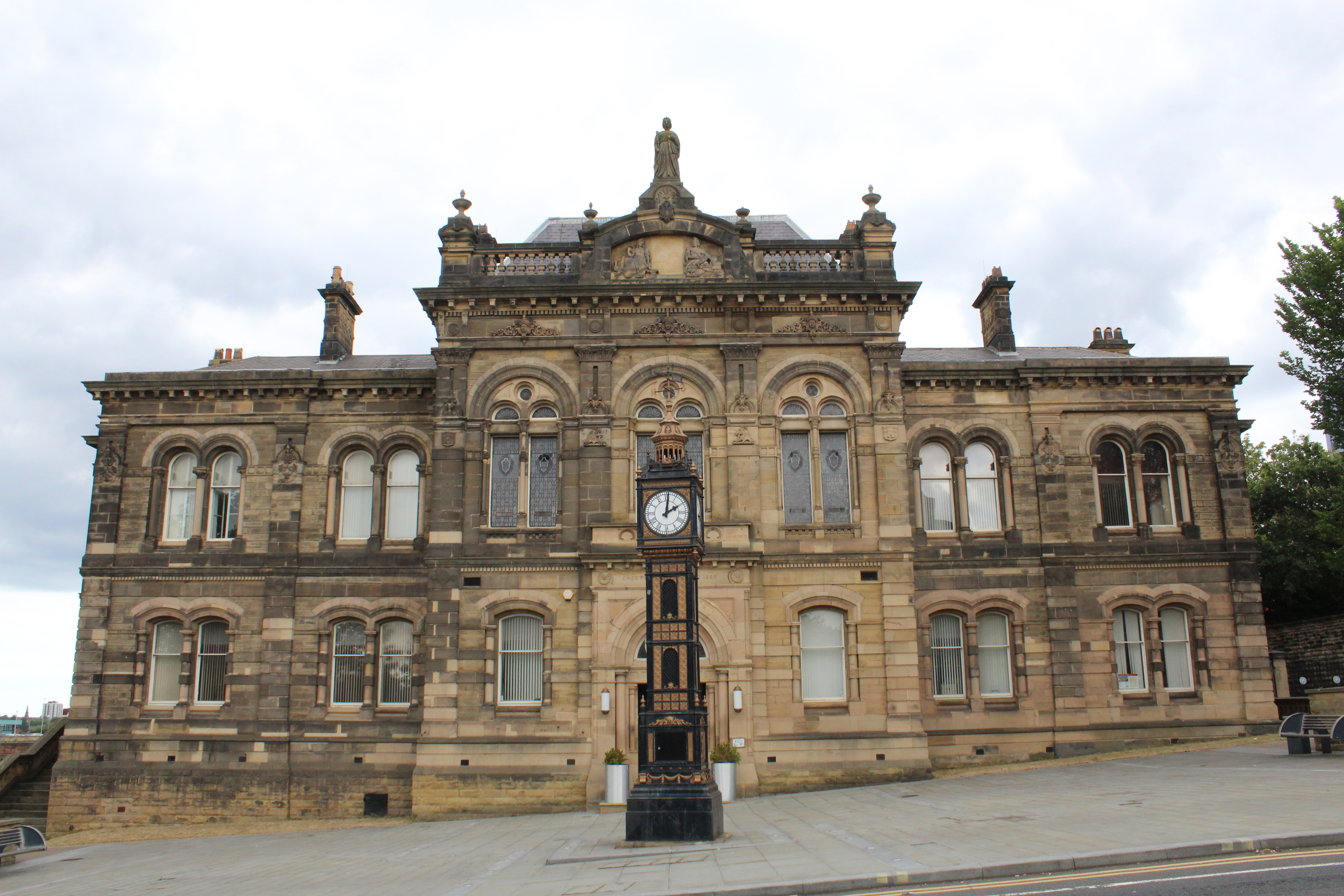
- Old Town Hall, Gateshead

- Shown in Tyne and Wear
- 54.9644°N 1.6039°W
- Location: West Street, Gateshead

History
- Built: 1870

Site notes
- Architect: John Johnstone
- Architectural style: Italianate style

Listed Building – Grade II
- Official name: Town Hall, ancillary buildings and former Police Station to rear, West Street
- Designated: 13 January 1983
- Reference no.: 1277845

The Old Town Hall is a municipal building in West Street, Gateshead, England. It is a Grade II listed building.

== History ==
The first town hall in Gateshead was in Bush Yard. The council subsequently established itself in a building in Greenesfield in 1844. The foundation stone for the current building was laid in 1868: a stand collapsed during the ceremony killing a member of the public. The current building was designed in the Italianate style by John Johnstone who had also designed Newcastle Town Hall. Construction work on the Gateshead building was delayed after preparatory work penetrated a coal seam leading to the collapse of nearby properties and the building was eventually completed in 1870. The design involved a symmetrical main frontage with seven bays facing onto West Street; the central section of three bays, which slightly projected forward, featured a round headed doorway on the ground floor, and three stained glass windows on the first floor: there was an ornately carved pediment with a statue depicting justice at roof level.

The old town hall also served as a magistrates' court and a police station. In 1892 an ornamental clock (By Gillett & Johnston), which is Grade II listed and stands in front of the town hall, was presented to Gateshead by the mayor, Walter de Lancey Willson, on the occasion of him being elected for a third time. He was also one of the founders of Walter Willson's, a chain of grocers in the North East and Cumbria. Queen Elizabeth II, accompanied by the Duke of Edinburgh, crossed the Tyne Bridge from the north and signed the town hall visitors' book at a small table on the south side of the bridge on 29 October 1954.

The building remained the headquarters of the Metropolitan Borough of Gateshead until the council moved to Gateshead Civic Centre in Regent Street in 1987. The town hall was occupied by the Microelectronics Applications Research Institute ('MARI') which established its head office in the building from 1987 to 2001. It was then briefly used by the management of Sage Gateshead while they waited for their new building at Gateshead Quays to be competed in December 2004.

The Tyneside Cinema occupied the town hall under a short term lease while a restoration and renovation project was undertaken on its premises in Newcastle upon Tyne between November 2006 and May 2008. The main performance hall in the old town hall was refurbished in 2009 and the building was managed by Sage Gateshead from January 2013. In 2018 it was acquired by "Dinosauria" which has announced plans to convert it into an "unnatural history museum".
