= Hadrian's Tower =

Residential tower in England

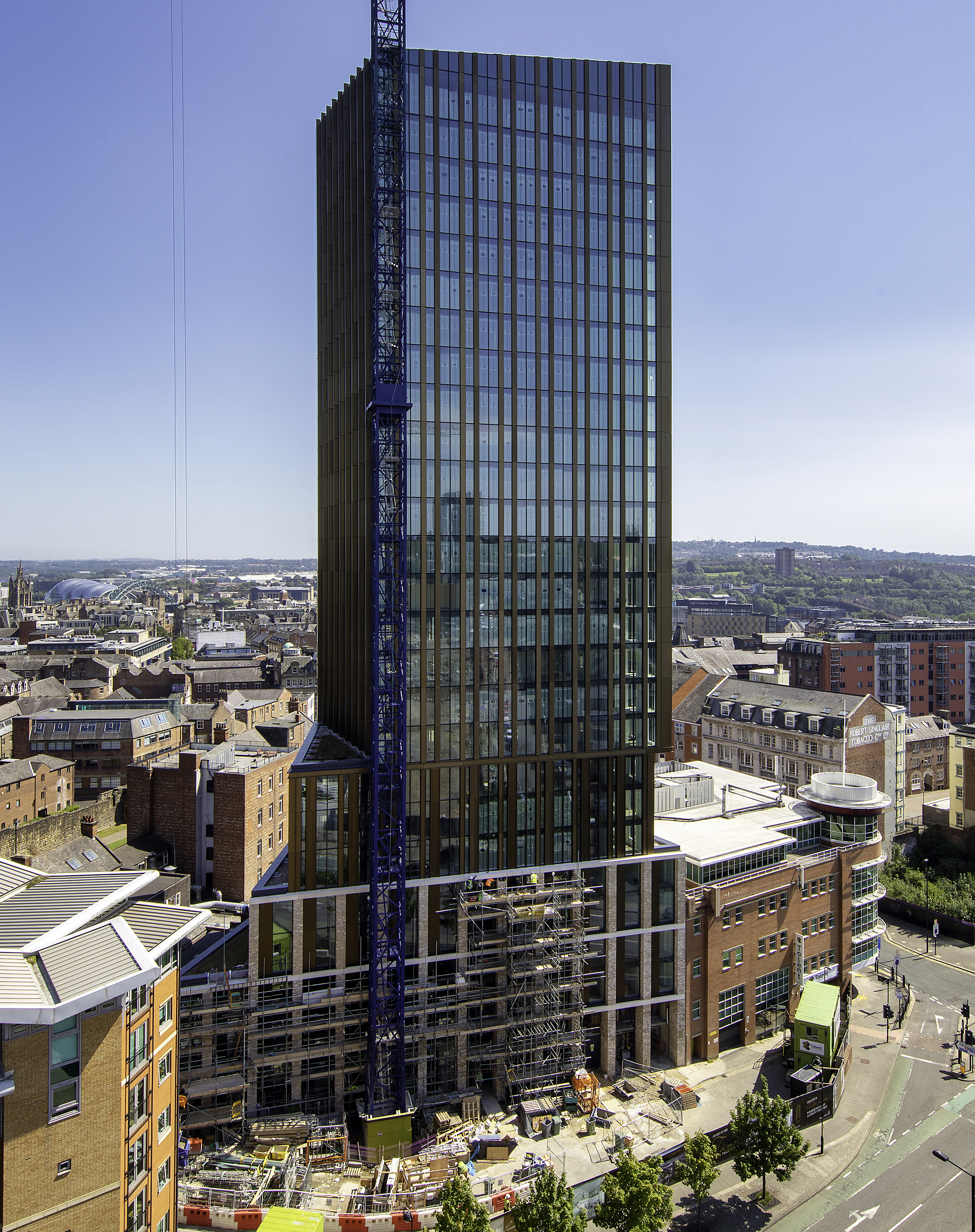
- Under construction, July 2020

- Location within Tyne and Wear

General information
- Type: Residential
- Location: Newcastle upon Tyne, 27 Rutherford St, Newcastle upon Tyne NE4 5DP
- Coordinates: 54.9713°N 1.6221°W
- Construction started: 2018
- Completed: September 2020
- Opened: December 2020
- Cost: GBP £26 million
- Client: Citygrove Securities

Height
- Top floor: 83 metres (272 ft)

Technical details
- Structural system: Reynaers
- Floor count: 27
- Floor area: 12,500 m^{2} (135,000 sq ft)
- Lifts/elevators: 2

Design and construction
- Architecture firm: FaulknerBrowns Architects
- Structural engineer: 3E Consulting Engineers
- Quantity surveyor: Deacon and Jones
- Main contractor: Tolent

Website
- www.hadriansnewcastle.co.uk

Hadrian's Tower is a residential tower block in Newcastle upon Tyne. It is the tallest building in Newcastle. Located at 27 Rutherford Street, construction started in 2018 and was completed in September 2020.

== History ==
Hadrian's Tower was designed by Faulkner Browns, built by Tolent Construction, glazed by EVB Facades (UK) Ltd, with façade elements fabricated by Bespoke Architectural Fabrications Ltd, and handed over to the developer, The High Street Group, in September 2020 and opened in December 2020.

== See also ==
- List of tallest buildings and structures in Newcastle upon Tyne
