= Corn Exchange, Berwick-upon-Tweed =

Commercial building in Berwick-upon-Tweed, Northumberland, England

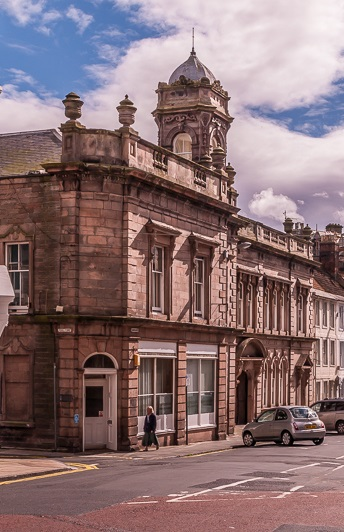
- Corn Exchange, Berwick-upon-Tweed

- Shown in Northumberland
- 55.7675°N 2.0031°W
- Location: Sandgate, Berwick-upon-Tweed

History
- Built: 1858

Site notes
- Architect: John Johnstone
- Architectural style: Italianate style

Listed Building – Grade II
- Official name: Former Corn Exchange
- Designated: 23 June 2000
- Reference no.: 1380349

The Corn Exchange is a commercial building in Sandgate, Berwick-upon-Tweed, Northumberland, England. The structure, which is now used as an apartment block, is a Grade II listed building.

== History ==
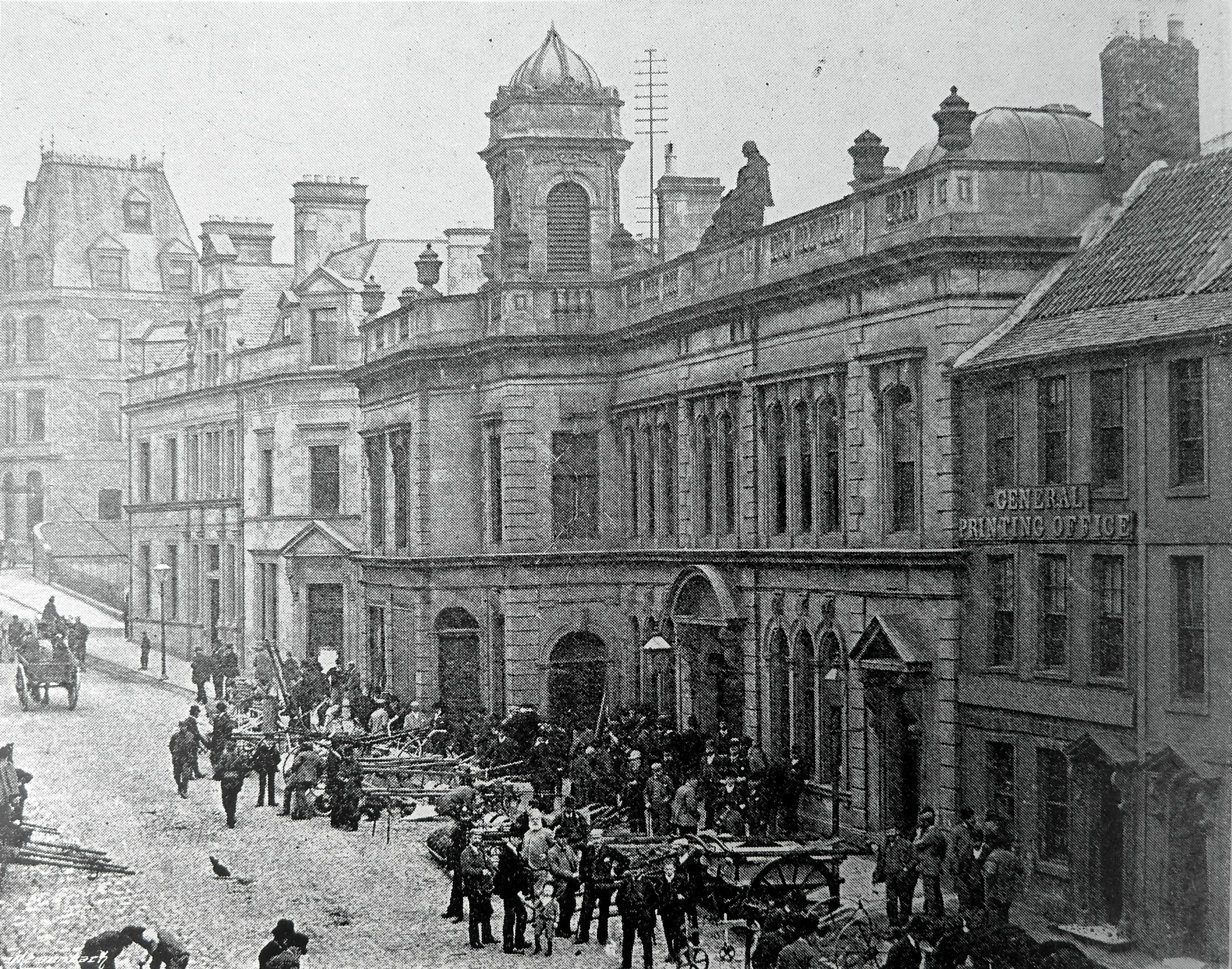
A view of the building in 1905

In the mid-19th century, a group of local businessmen decided to form a private company, known as the "Berwick Corn Exchange Company", to finance and commission a purpose-built corn exchange for the town. The site that they selected was on the east side of Sandgate. The foundation stone for the new building was laid by the chairman of the development committee, Robert Ramsay, on 27 June 1857. It was designed by John Johnstone of Newcastle upon Tyne in the Italianate style, built by Matthew Reed of Newcastle upon Tyne in ashlar stone at a cost of £5,000, and was officially opened with a public dinner on 28 June 1858.

The original design involved an asymmetrical main frontage of eight bays facing onto the Sandgate, with the first three bays on the left projected forward. The first three bays on the left were fenestrated by round headed windows with architraves and keystones on the ground floor and by square headed sash windows with architraves and cornices supported by brackets on the first floor. The fourth bay, which was also projected forward but to a lesser extent, featured a three-stage tower, with sash windows in the first two stages and a square structure fenestrated by a round headed window in the third stage; it was surmounted by an ogee-shaped dome and a weather vane. The fifth and seventh bays contained tripartite windows with round heads on the ground floor and tripartite windows with segmental heads on the first floor. The sixth bay featured a wide opening flanked by pilasters supporting a segmental pediment on the ground floor and a bipartite window with segmental heads on the first floor. The right-hand bay contained a doorway flanked by pilasters supporting a triangular pediment on the ground floor and a square headed sash window with an architrave and a cornice supported by brackets on the first floor. At roof level there was a balustraded parapet and a series of urns. Internally, the principal room was an oval-shaped main hall, which was 85 feet (26 m) long and 70 feet (21 m) wide with a coved ceiling.

The building was the venue for the volunteer ball held in January each year by the Northumberland Militia Artillery and the Northumberland Rifle Volunteers. It was also used for concerts: performers included the singing group, Christy's Minstrels, in October 1864, the soprano singer, Thérèse Tietjens, in February 1866, and the tenor vocalist, Sims Reeves, in November 1867.

The use of the building as a corn exchange declined significantly in the wake of the Great Depression of British Agriculture in the late 19th century. However, it continued to be used for public events: the former local member of parliament, Viscount Grey, who served as Foreign Secretary during the First World War, returned to the corn exchange to give a wide-ranging speech about British foreign policy in October 1921.

The Bank of Liverpool and Martins opened a sub-branch in the building in 1922. The branch was rebranded as Martins Bank in 1928 and the building remained as a bank until 1965, when the left-hand section was converted into offices and right-hand section was converted into a swimming pool. The building changed use again in 1998 when the entire structure was converted into apartments.

== See also ==
- Corn exchanges in England
