= Gateshead Civic Centre =

Municipal building in Gateshead, Tyne and Wear, England

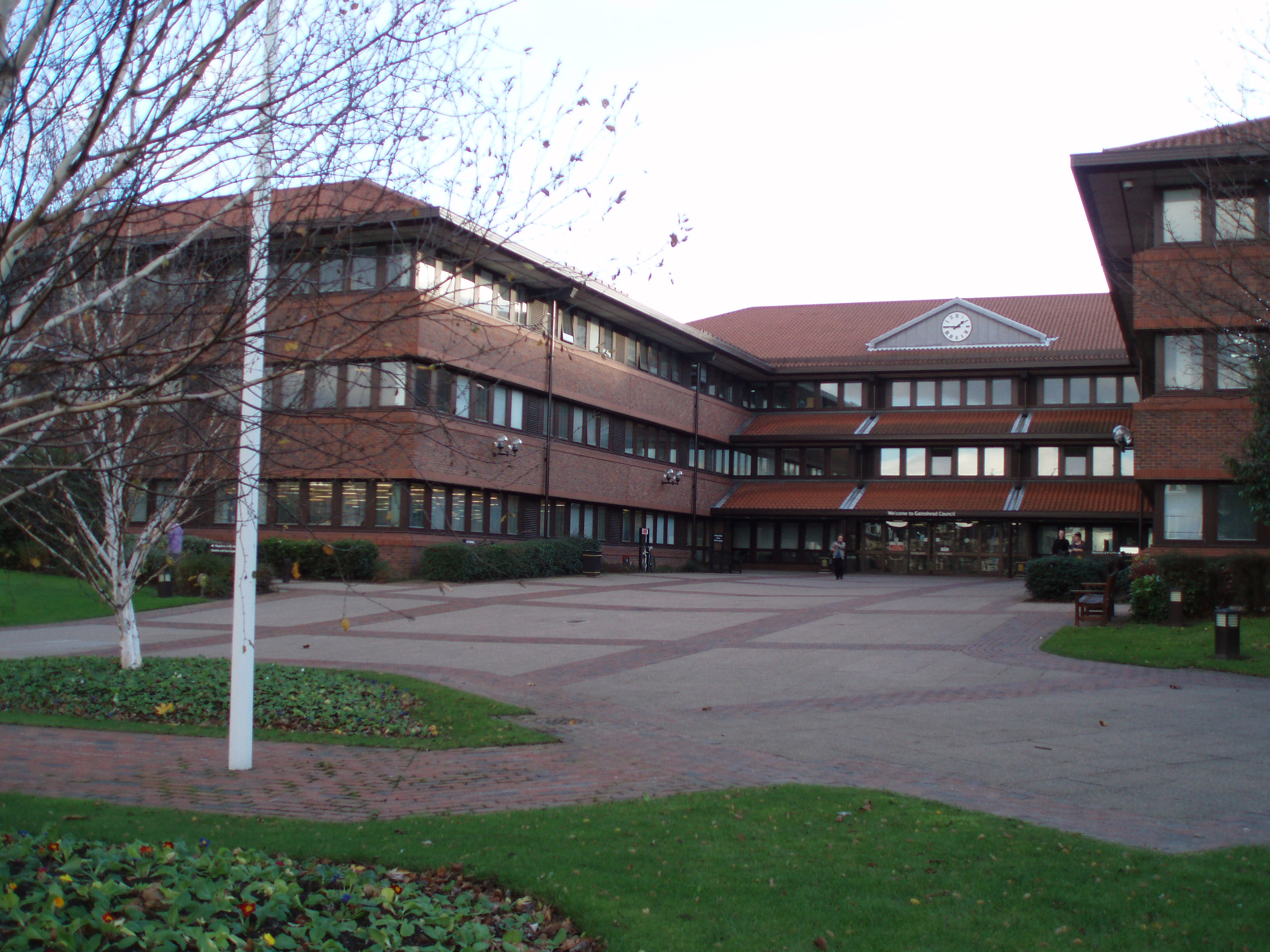
- Gateshead Civic Centre

- Shown in Tyne and Wear
- 54.9594°N 1.6035°W
- Location: Regent Street, Gateshead

History
- Built: 1987

Site notes
- Architect: D W Robson

Gateshead Civic Centre is a municipal building in the Regent Street, Gateshead, England.

== History ==
The civic centre was commissioned to replace the aging 19th century town hall in West Street. After Tyne and Wear County Council was abolished in April 1986, Gateshead Council took on significant extra responsibilities from the county council and the old town hall was considered inadequate for the expanded role. The new building, which was designed by the borough's Director of Architecture, D W Robson, was completed in 1987. The design of the building involved a three-storey central square block, containing the council chamber and committee rooms, with four quadrilateral blocks at each corner of the central block, each containing offices for council officers and their departments. The council chamber features four stained glass panels, a piece of art entitled "the Gateshead Story" which commemorates the lives of famous people from Gateshead.

Queen Elizabeth II, accompanied by the Duke of Edinburgh, visited the new civic centre on 1 December 1990 and signed the visitors' book before departing for Blaydon to conduct the official opening of the new Blaydon Bridge across the River Tyne. In 1991 three large stone figures individually depicting infancy, maturity and old age and collectively known as "The Family", which had been carved from large blocks of crystalline Cumbrian limestone by the sculptor, Gordon Young, were erected outside the civic centre.

A refurbishment of the building, involving new desks and chairs for over 1,500 employees and a new public restaurant, was completed in 2012. In February 2017 Prince Harry arrived at the civic centre to meet volunteers involved with the charity Walking With The Wounded as well as ex-servicemen who have benefited from the charity's projects. The ceremony rooms, where weddings and receptions take place, were renovated with improved lighting and a new "flower wall" in June 2018.
