= Newcastle Town Hall =

Municipal building in Newcastle upon Tyne, Tyne and Wear, England

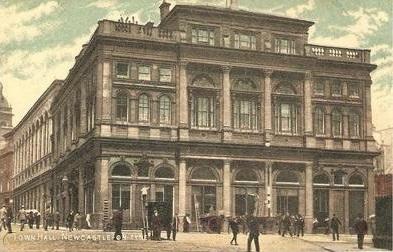
- The Town Hall

- Shown in Tyne and Wear
- 54.97052°N 1.61221°W
- Location: Newcastle upon Tyne

History
- Built: 1863
- Demolished: 1973

Site notes
- Architect: John Johnstone
- Architectural style: Italian neoclassical style

The Town Hall was a local government building located in St Nicholas Square, Newcastle upon Tyne. It was the headquarters of Newcastle City Council until November 1968.

== History ==
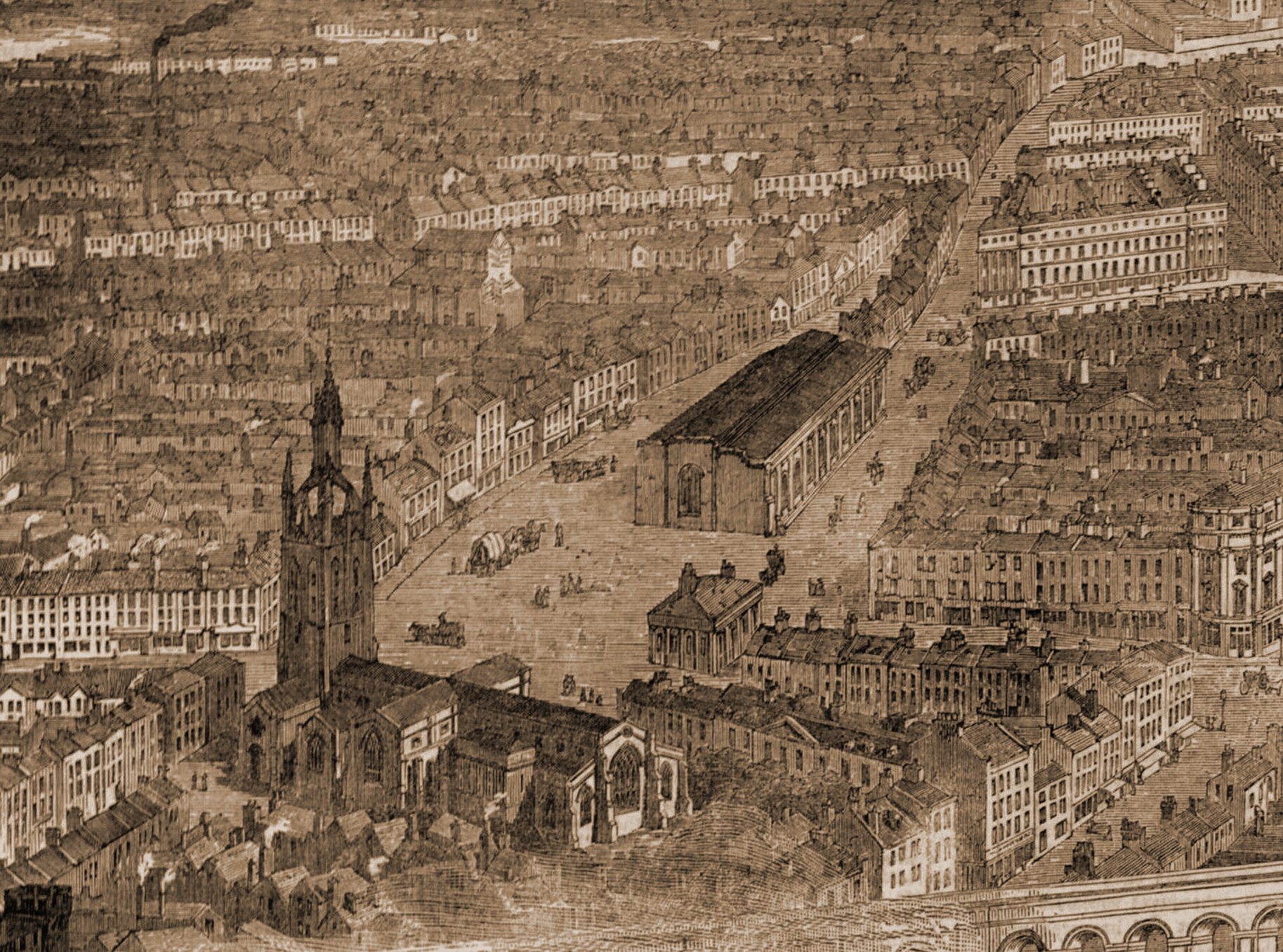
The old corn exchange (in the centre of the picture) completed in 1839

In the 1830s, a group of local businessmen decided to form a company, to be known as the "Corn Market Company", to finance and commission a purpose-built corn exchange for the town. They site they selected was on the north side of St Nicholas Square (between the Bigg Market and the Cloth Market), where corn merchants had previously carried out their trade in the open air.

The foundation stone for the corn exchange was laid by the mayor, Thomas Emerson Headlam, in 1837. It was designed by John and Benjamin Green, built in ashlar stone and was officially opened on 16 November 1839. The corn exchange was 156 feet (48 m) long, 45 feet (14 m) wide at the north end and 82 feet (25 m) wide at the south end. However, by the early 1850s, the Corn Market Company was in financial difficulty, and the directors, who did not have adequate funds to maintain the building properly, agreed to hand over the site to Newcastle upon Tyne Corporation for development.

Meanwhile, civic leaders decided to use the site for a new town hall: until that time civic leaders had held their meetings in the Guildhall. The foundation stone for the new town hall was laid by the mayor, Sir Isaac Lowthian Bell, in 1855. The design, which was undertaken by John Johnstone in the Italian neoclassical style, involved incorporating the corn exchange into the central section of the building as an assembly hall capable of accommodating 3,000 people: a large concert organ was acquired at that time. The design also involved a council chamber and municipal offices for Newcastle Town Council. The main frontage of the new building, facing the cathedral, featured four Corinthian order columns on the ground floor and four more on the first floor, while the rear elevation, facing onto the Bigg Market, had a tower with a cupola. The works, which cost some £50,000, were completed in 1863.

The first organised dog show in the UK was held in the assembly hall in the building in 1859. The town council, which became a city council in 1882, failed to maintain the building properly and the tower had to be demolished in the 1930s.

By the middle of the 20th century, condition of the town hall had deteriorated to such an extent that the council was forced to relocate to modern facilities at Newcastle Civic Centre in Barras Bridge in November 1968. A "winter zoo" involving lions, tigers, monkeys, exotic birds and snakes continued to be held in the building in the late 1960s but, ultimately, the town hall had to be demolished in 1973. The site was subsequently redeveloped to create a complex of modern office buildings known as No. 1 Cathedral Square (the southern section) and Stanegate House (the northern section).
