= George Kenyon =

British architect

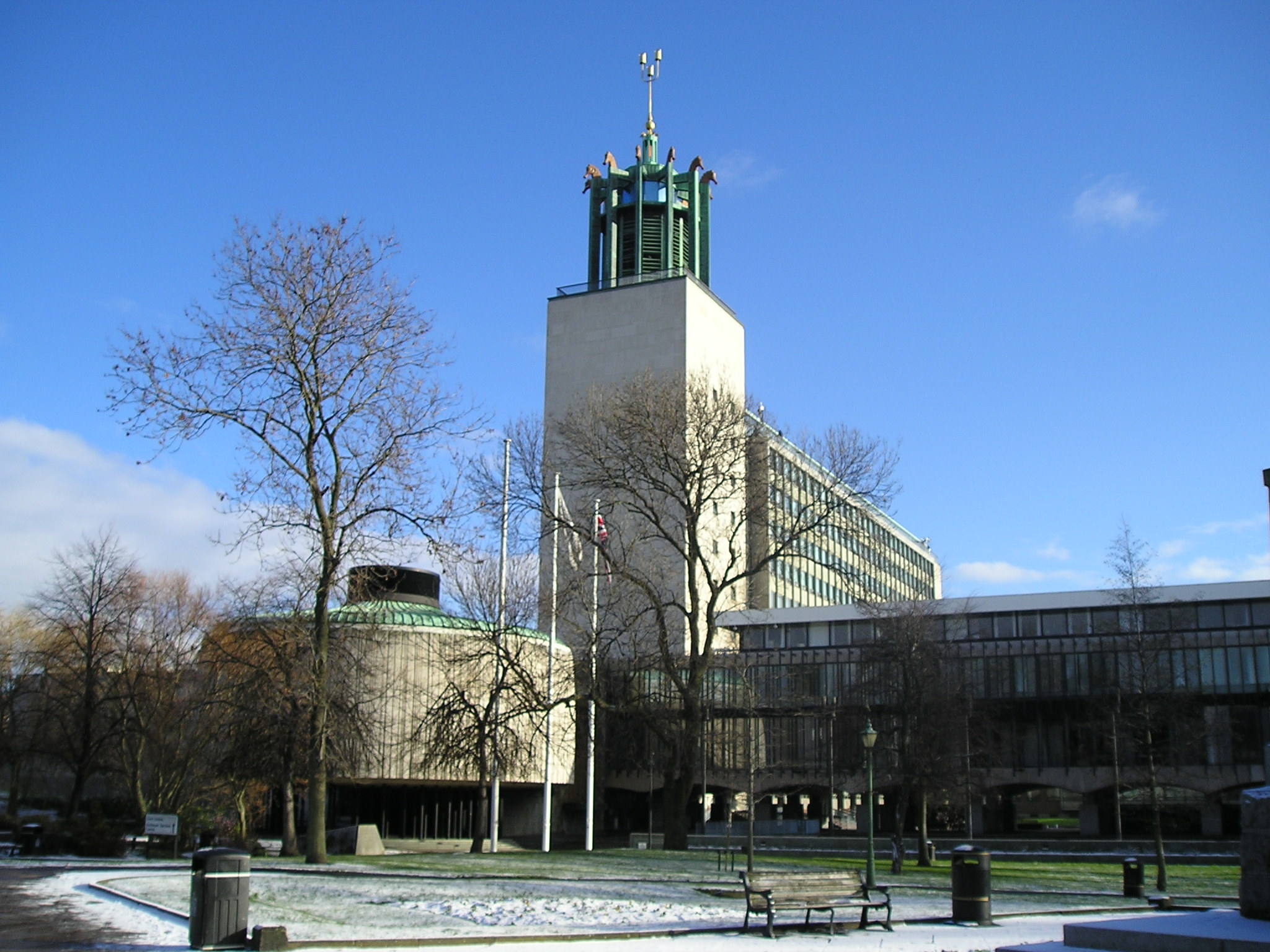
Newcastle Civic Centre

George Kenyon was a British architect, who worked as City Architect for the city of Newcastle upon Tyne. He designed the Newcastle Civic Centre in the 1950s, which was completed in 1967. It was given 'Grade II* listed' (the second-highest possible) designation in November 1995, making it legally protected from unauthorised alteration or demolition. Earlier in his career, Kenyon he was involved in the construction of the Empire State Building.

Kenyon, George W., 1908 - 1976 George W. Kenyon [commonly known as G. W. Kenyon] was born in Liverpool, England on 29 January 1908. He entered the University of Liverpool, School of Architecture in 1925. He gained work experience in the office of Shreve, Lamb & Harmon in New York City in 1928. He was awarded and that year be a B.Arch. with distinction in 1930 and that year began working for Liverpool Corporation Housing Department. He was employed as an assistant in the office of Herbert James Royse (1887-1963) in 1932. He was architectural assistant at Leeds Corporation in 1934. In 1947 he was appointed City Architect of Newcastle upon Tyne, a post he held until 1973.. Kenyon was elected an Associate of the Royal Institute of British Architects (ARIBA) in 1933. He died in Newcastle Upon Tyne, Northumberland in 1976.
