= Bigg Market =

Historic site in Newcastle upon Tyne, England

Coordinates: 54°58′17.1″N 1°36′52.1″W

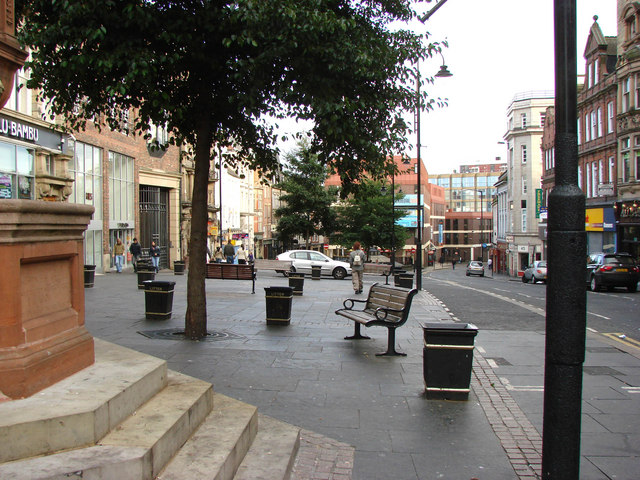
Bigg Market

The Bigg Market is a site of historical significance in Newcastle upon Tyne and dates back to the Middle Ages, when it was the site of a thriving marketplace that formed an important part of the Great North Road. The market was named after a type of coarse barley, called bigg, that was widely sold from the stalls. Other nearby markets included the Cloth Market and the Groat Market. The Bigg Market is located close to Newcastle Cathedral.

Newcastle's old Town Hall, which was built between 1858 and 1863 was located in St Nicholas Square (between the Groat Market and the Cloth Market adjacent to The Bigg Market) and served as the meeting place of Newcastle City Council between 1863 and 1968.

More recently the Bigg Market has become known for its drinking culture and disorderly behaviour. It has more than 20 bars and restaurants housed in its 31 buildings, many of which are listed buildings in a state of some disrepair.

In February 2015 the business improvement district company for Newcastle city centre received initial support of £202,800 from the Heritage Lottery Fund. Approximately £2.9M of combined funding is expected to be used to reinvigorate the Bigg Market by recreating the historic area in a commercially sustainable manner.
