= Gateshead Council elections =

Local government elections in Tyne and Wear, England

Gateshead Council elections are generally held three years out of every four, with a third of the council being elected each time. Gateshead Council is the local authority for the metropolitan borough of Gateshead in Tyne and Wear, England.

== Council elections ==
Summary of recent election results:

| Year | Labour | Lib Dem | Totals |
|---|---|---|---|
| 2026 | | | |
| 2024 | | | |
| 2023 | 49 | 17 | 66 |
| 2022 | 51 | 15 | 66 |
| 2019 | 52 | 14 | 66 |
| 2018 | 54 | 12 | 66 |
| 2016 | 54 | 12 | 66 |
| 2015 | 55 | 11 | 66 |
| 2014 | 55 | 11 | 66 |

- 1998 Gateshead Metropolitan Borough Council election
- 1999 Gateshead Metropolitan Borough Council election
- 2000 Gateshead Metropolitan Borough Council election
- 2002 Gateshead Metropolitan Borough Council election
- 2003 Gateshead Metropolitan Borough Council election
- 2004 Gateshead Metropolitan Borough Council election (whole council elected after boundary changes)
- 2006 Gateshead Metropolitan Borough Council election
- 2007 Gateshead Metropolitan Borough Council election
- 2008 Gateshead Metropolitan Borough Council election
- 2010 Gateshead Metropolitan Borough Council election
- 2011 Gateshead Metropolitan Borough Council election
- 2012 Gateshead Metropolitan Borough Council election
- 2014 Gateshead Metropolitan Borough Council election
- 2015 Gateshead Metropolitan Borough Council election
- 2016 Gateshead Metropolitan Borough Council election
- 2018 Gateshead Metropolitan Borough Council election
- 2019 Gateshead Metropolitan Borough Council election
- 2021 Gateshead Metropolitan Borough Council election
- 2022 Gateshead Metropolitan Borough Council election
- 2023 Gateshead Metropolitan Borough Council election
- 2024 Gateshead Metropolitan Borough Council election
- 2026 Gateshead Metropolitan Borough Council election (whole council elected after boundary changes)

== Results maps ==
2004 results map

2006 results map

2007 results map

2008 results map

2010 results map

2011 results map

2012 results map

2014 results map

2015 results map

2016 results map

2018 results map

2019 results map

2021 results map

2022 results map

2023 results map

2024 results map

2026 results map

== Changes between elections ==
=== 1998-2002 ===
Wickham South By-Election 17 September 1998
| Party | Candidate | Votes | % | ±% |
|---|---|---|---|---|
| Liberal Democrats | | 1,598 | 83.6 | +13.0 |
| Labour | | 314 | 16.4 | −7.0 |
| Majority | | 1,284 | 67.2 | |
| Turnout | | 1,912 | | |
| Liberal Democrats hold | | Swing | | |

Bede By-Election 29 March 2001
| Party | Candidate | Votes | % | ±% |
|---|---|---|---|---|
| Labour | | 780 | 63.9 | −6.4 |
| Liberal Democrats | | 440 | 36.1 | +19.2 |
| Majority | | 340 | 27.8 | |
| Turnout | | 1,220 | 21.3 | |
| Labour hold | | Swing | | |

Chowdene By-Election 7 June 2001
| Party | Candidate | Votes | % | ±% |
|---|---|---|---|---|
| Labour | Keith Wood | 2,649 | 68.8 | +4.5 |
| Conservative | Raymnond Swadling | 604 | 15.7 | −4.8 |
| Liberal Democrats | Glynis Goodwill | 599 | 15.6 | +0.3 |
| Majority | | 2,045 | 53.1 | |
| Turnout | | 3,852 | 56.4 | +28.0 |
| Labour hold | | Swing | | |

=== 2002-2006 ===
Felling By-Election 1 December 2005
| Party | Candidate | Votes | % | ±% |
|---|---|---|---|---|
| Labour | Paul McNally | 848 | 69.2 | +6.3 |
| Liberal Democrats | David Lucas | 208 | 17.0 | +0.2 |
| BNP | Keith McFarlane | 96 | 7.8 | −2.3 |
| Conservative | Steve Wraith | 74 | 6.0 | −4.3 |
| Majority | | 640 | 52.1 | |
| Turnout | | 1,226 | 20.3 | |
| Labour hold | | Swing | | |

=== 2006-2010 ===
Dunston & Teams By-Election 28 September 2006
| Party | Candidate | Votes | % | ±% |
|---|---|---|---|---|
| Labour | Pauline Dillon | 694 | 54.9 | +0.7 |
| Liberal Democrats | Michael Ruddy | 269 | 21.3 | +3.6 |
| BNP | Andrew Swaddle | 226 | 17.9 | +4.6 |
| Conservative | | 76 | 6.0 | −3.0 |
| Majority | | 425 | 33.6 | |
| Turnout | | 1,265 | 21.1 | |
| Labour hold | | Swing | | |

Dunston and Teams By-Election 5 July 2007
| Party | Candidate | Votes | % | ±% |
|---|---|---|---|---|
| Labour | Gary Haley | 793 | 62.1 | +7.7 |
| Liberal Democrats | | 285 | 22.3 | +1.6 |
| BNP | | 131 | 10.3 | −4.3 |
| Conservative | | 69 | 5.4 | −5.0 |
| Majority | | 508 | 39.8 | |
| Turnout | | 1,278 | 20.3 | |
| Labour hold | | Swing | | |

Wickham South and Sunniside By-Election 31 July 2008
| Party | Candidate | Votes | % | ±% |
|---|---|---|---|---|
| Liberal Democrats | John McClurey | 1,612 | 72.5 | +4.4 |
| Labour | Elaine Dobson | 394 | 17.7 | +4.2 |
| Conservative | John Robertson | 217 | 9.8 | −8.6 |
| Majority | | 1,218 | 54.8 | |
| Turnout | | 2,223 | 32.3 | |
| Liberal Democrats hold | | Swing | | |

Chopwell and Rowlands Gill By-Election 14 May 2009
| Party | Candidate | Votes | % | ±% |
|---|---|---|---|---|
| Labour | Lynne Caffrey | 1,221 | 53.2 | −3.9 |
| Liberal Democrats | Raymond Callender | 898 | 39.1 | +12.5 |
| Conservative | Bill Thorkildsen | 177 | 7.7 | −8.6 |
| Majority | | 323 | 14.1 | |
| Turnout | | 2,296 | 32.1 | |
| Labour hold | | Swing | | |

=== 2010-2014 ===
Lobley Hill and Bensham By-Election 23 September 2010
| Party | Candidate | Votes | % | ±% |
|---|---|---|---|---|
| Labour | Eileen McMaster | 1,120 | 69.3 | +15.2 |
| Liberal Democrats | Michael Ruddy | 298 | 18.4 | −5.0 |
| BNP | Derrick Robson | 101 | 6.3 | −0.7 |
| Conservative | Val Bond | 97 | 6.0 | −6.5 |
| Majority | | 822 | 50.9 | |
| Turnout | | 1,616 | | |
| Labour hold | | Swing | | |

Saltwell By-Election 23 September 2010
| Party | Candidate | Votes | % | ±% |
|---|---|---|---|---|
| Labour | Denise Robson | 793 | 68.8 | +10.4 |
| Liberal Democrats | Laura Turner | 196 | 17.0 | −5.2 |
| Conservative | Alan Bond | 86 | 7.5 | −5.9 |
| BNP | Janet Robson | 77 | 6.7 | +0.7 |
| Majority | | 597 | 51.8 | |
| Turnout | | 1,152 | | |
| Labour hold | | Swing | | |

=== 2014-2018 ===
Chopwell and Rowlands Gill By-Election 22 September 2016
| Party | Candidate | Votes | % | ±% |
|---|---|---|---|---|
| Labour | Dave Bradford | 1,066 | 59.1 | −3.6 |
| UKIP | Ray Tolley | 282 | 15.6 | +1.2 |
| Liberal Democrats | Amelia Ord | 221 | 12.3 | +7.9 |
| Conservative | John Lathan | 156 | 8.6 | −2.3 |
| Green | Dave Castleton | 79 | 4.4 | −3.2 |
| Majority | | 784 | 43.5 | |
| Turnout | | 1,804 | | |
| Labour hold | | Swing | | |

=== 2022-2026 ===
Bridges By-Election 12 September 2024
| Party | Candidate | Votes | % | ±% |
|---|---|---|---|---|
| Labour | Robert Waugh | 320 | 30.6 | −18.4 |
| Liberal Democrats | Jonathan Aibi | 255 | 24.4 | +16.8 |
| Green | Rachel Cabral | 253 | 24.2 | −8.5 |
| Reform | David Ayre | 166 | 15.9 | +15.9 |
| Conservative | Paul Sterling | 53 | 5.1 | −5.6 |
| Majority | | 65 | 6.2 | |
| Turnout | | 1,047 | | |
| Labour hold | | Swing | | |

Whickham North By-Election 24 October 2024
| Party | Candidate | Votes | % | ±% |
|---|---|---|---|---|
| Liberal Democrats | Susan Craig | 902 | 64.6 | +6.7 |
| Labour | Jeff Bowe | 285 | 20.4 | −6.3 |
| Conservative | Robert Ableson | 137 | 9.8 | +0.9 |
| Green | Pat Chanse | 72 | 5.2 | −1.3 |
| Majority | | 617 | 44.2 | |
| Turnout | | 1,396 | | |
| Liberal Democrats hold | | Swing | | |

=== 2026-2030 ===
High Fell By-Election 9 July 2026
| Party | Candidate | Votes | % | ±% |
|---|---|---|---|---|
| Reform | Lindsay Atkinson | 564 | 40.1 | |
| Labour | Kathryn Walker | 559 | 39.7 | |
| Liberal Democrats | Jonathan Aibi | 98 | 7.0 | |
| Conservative | Barry Flux | 79 | 5.6 | |
| Green | Lee Turner | 71 | 5.0 | |
| TUSC | Elaine Brunskill | 36 | 2.6 | |
| Majority | | 5 | 0.4 | |
| Turnout | | 1,407 | | |
| Reform hold | | Swing | | |
