= 2010 Gateshead Metropolitan Borough Council election =

2010 English local government election

Map of the 2010 Gateshead Metropolitan Borough Council election

The 2010 Gateshead Metropolitan Borough Council election took place on 6 May 2010 to elect a third of the members of Gateshead Metropolitan Borough Council, the council of Gateshead in England. This was on the same day as the other local elections as well as the 2010 United Kingdom general election. The previous council election took place in 2008 and the following election was held in 2011. In the election, the council stayed under Labour control.

== Results ==
| Party | Previous | Seats +/- | 2010 |
|---|---|---|---|
| Labour | 41 | ▲4 | 45 |
| Liberal Democrats | 24 | ▼4 | 20 |
| Liberal | 1 | Steady | 1 |

== See also ==
- Gateshead Metropolitan Borough Council elections
