= 2023 Gateshead Metropolitan Borough Council election =

2023 council election in England

- 4 May 2023

22 of 66 seats to Gateshead Metropolitan Borough Council 34 seats needed for a majority
- Turnout: 48,898 (34.4%)

	First party	Second party
Leader	Martin Gannon	Ron Beadle
Party	Labour	Liberal Democrats
Last election	51 seats, 49.9%	15 seats, 24.5%
Seats before	51	15
Seats won	15	7
Seats after	49	17
Seat change	▼2	▲2
Popular vote	24,456	13,363
Percentage	50.2%	27.4%
Swing	▲0.3%	▲2.9%
- Winner of each seat at the 2023 Gateshead Metropolitan Borough Council election
Leader before election
Martin Gannon
Labour
Leader after election
Martin Gannon
Labour

The 2023 Gateshead Metropolitan Borough Council took place on 4 May 2023 to elect members of Gateshead Metropolitan Borough Council in England. This was on the same day as other local elections across England. One third of the council was elected. One candidate was elected from each of the council's 22 wards.

== Background ==
In the 2022 election, the Labour Party retained a supermajority of seats.

Labour retained its majority on the council, although lost two seats to the Liberal Democrats.

== Summary ==
=== Election result ===
2023 Gateshead Metropolitan Borough Council election
Party	This election			Full council			This election		
Party	Seats	Net	Seats %	Other	Total	Total %	Votes	Votes %	+/−
Labour	15	▼2	68.2	34	49	74.2	24,456	50.2	+0.3
Liberal Democrats	7	▲2	31.8	10	17	25.8	13,363	27.4	+2.9
Conservative	0	Steady	0.0	0	0	0.0	6,079	12.5	–4.0
Green	0	Steady	0.0	0	0	0.0	3,654	7.5	–0.7
TUSC	0	Steady	0.0	0	0	0.0	664	1.4	+0.8
Independent	0	Steady	0.0	0	0	0.0	281	0.6	+0.5
Reform	0	Steady	0.0	0	0	0.0	135	0.3	N/A
Save Us Now	0	Steady	0.0	0	0	0.0	75	0.2	+0.1

== Ward results ==
The results for each ward were as follows:

=== Birtley ===
Birtley
Party	Candidate	Votes	%	±%
Liberal Democrats	Paul Thomas Elliott	1,224	56.6	+13.8
Labour	Catherine Mary Davison	768	35.5	−10.9
Conservative	Joseph Ronald Callanhan	169	7.8	−3.0
Majority		456	21.1	N/A
Turnout		2171	35.4	+0.7
Registered electors		6,132		
Liberal Democrats gain from Labour		Swing		

=== Blaydon ===
Blaydon
Party	Candidate	Votes	%	±%
Labour	Malcolm Alfred Brain	1,312	65.6	+12.7
Liberal Democrats	Steven Hawkins	353	17.6	+10.3
Conservative	Edward Bohill	219	10.9	−17.8
TUSC	Tom Allen	117	5.8	+5.8
Majority		959	48.0	+23.8
Turnout		2001	28.2	+0.9
Registered electors		7,079		
Labour hold		Swing		

=== Bridges ===
Bridges
Party	Candidate	Votes	%	±%
Labour	Bob Goldsworthy	904	58.2	−7.7
Conservative	Martin Backley	248	16.0	−1.6
Green	Andy Blanchflower	223	14.4	+14.4
Liberal Democrats	Gareth Cooper	177	11.4	−5.1
Majority		656	42.2	
Turnout		1561	27.5	
Registered electors		5,678		
Labour hold		Swing		

=== Chopwell and Rowlands Gill ===
Chopwell and Rowlands Gill
Party	Candidate	Votes	%	±%
Labour	Michael McNestry	1,681	66.8	+5.1
Conservative	Louise Beatrice Prince	402	16.0	−3.5
Liberal Democrats	Jean Margaret Callender	316	12.6	+5.5
TUSC	Tony Dodds	118	4.7	+4.7
Majority		1279	50.8	+8.6
Turnout		2535	38.0	−2.0
Registered electors		6,715		
Labour hold		Swing		

=== Chowdene ===
Chowdene
Party	Candidate	Votes	%	±%
Labour	Keith Wood	1,245	57.6	+2.5
Conservative	David William Potts	408	18.9	−1.5
Liberal Democrats	James Peter Kenyon	295	13.7	−0.2
Green	Thomas Frederick Newell	118	5.5	−2.2
TUSC	Mark Robertson	95	4.4	+1.5
Majority		837	38.7	+4.0
Turnout		2169	33.2	−1.1
Registered electors		6,533		
Labour hold		Swing		

=== Crawcrook and Greenside ===
Crawcrook and Greenside
Party	Candidate	Votes	%	±%
Labour	Kathryn Alexandra Henderson	1,374	48.1	+2.7
Green	Jack Philipson	1,017	35.6	+4.3
Conservative	Christopher Anthony Coxon	319	11.2	−6.0
Liberal Democrats	Oliver Christopher Martin William Jones-Lyons	147	5.1	−1.0
Majority		357	7.5	−6.6
Turnout		2867	40.1	−1.1
Registered electors		7,137		
Labour hold		Swing		

=== Deckham ===
Deckham
Party	Candidate	Votes	%	±%
Labour	Bernadette Teresa Oliphant	1,075	56.7	−3.2
Liberal Democrats	David Gilson Fawcett	220	11.6	+2.7
Conservative	Josh Alan Knotts	220	11.6	−5.5
Green	Gary Rutherford Brooks	194	10.2	−0.1
Reform	Robert Keith Kelly	135	7.1	+7.1
TUSC	Norman Hall	52	2.7	−1.2
Majority		855	45.1	+2.3
Turnout		1903	30.4	+0.6
Registered electors		6,257		
Labour hold		Swing		

=== Dunston and Teams ===
Dunston and Teams
Party	Candidate	Votes	%	±%
Labour	Gary Robert Haley	996	61.0	−0.5
Liberal Democrats	Alexander Forster Walls	345	21.1	+12.3
Conservative	Jordan-Lee Guthrie	291	17.8	+0.2
Majority		651	39.9	−4.0
Turnout		1641	27.5	−0.6
Registered electors		5,971		
Labour hold		Swing		

=== Dunston Hill and Whickham East ===
Dunston Hill and Whickham East
Party	Candidate	Votes	%	±%
Liberal Democrats	Vicky Anderson	1,250	51.7	+3.0
Labour	Andrew Dylan Moir	698	26.9	−5.1
Green	Isabel Mary Blanchflower	201	8.3	+2.1
Conservative	Jak Hocking	195	8.1	−3.2
Save Us Now	Graham Steele	75	3.1	+1.3
Majority		552	24.8	+8.1
Turnout		2429	37.0	−1.5
Registered electors		6,557		
Liberal Democrats hold		Swing		

=== Felling ===
Felling
Party	Candidate	Votes	%	±%
Labour	George Joseph Kasfikis	916	62.9	+3.5
Conservative	Peter Crompton Jackson	255	17.5	+0.7
Green	Ashleigh Taylor McLean	149	10.2	+1.4
Liberal Democrats	Mohammed Waqas	137	9.4	−5.6
Majority		1457	45.4	+2.8
Turnout		1457	26.1	−2.2
Registered electors		5,573		
Labour hold		Swing		

=== High Fell ===
High Fell
Party	Candidate	Votes	%	±%
Labour	Kathryn Dorothea Walker	1,519	72.9	+14.8
Liberal Democrats	Len Bell	210	10.1	−6.6
Conservative	Francis Thomas Athey	204	9.8	−4.6
TUSC	Elaine Brunskill	152	7.3	+0.4
Majority		1309	62.8	+21.4
Turnout		2094	35.2	+6.8
Registered electors		5,947		
Labour hold		Swing		

=== Lamesley ===
Lamesley
Party	Candidate	Votes	%	±%
Labour	Sheila Gallagher	1,382	62.7	+4.9
Conservative	Richard Herdman	419	19.0	−7.1
Liberal Democrats	Robinson Geoffrey Stanaway	219	9.9	+1.1
Green	Neil Campbell Grant	184	8.3	+1.0
Majority		963	43.7	+12.0
Turnout		2219	30.9	−1.3
Registered electors		7,178		
Labour hold		Swing		

=== Lobley Hill and Bensham ===
Lobley Hill and Bensham
Party	Candidate	Votes	%	±%
Labour	Eileen McMaster	1,282	59.6	+0.3
Conservative	John Rogan Gardiner	336	15.6	−2.8
Liberal Democrats	Jamie Rickelton	274	12.7	+1.2
Green	Andy Redfern	258	12.0	+1.1
Majority		946	44.0	−0.9
Turnout		2161	31.4	−0.1
Registered electors		6,886		
Labour hold		Swing		

=== Low Fell ===
Low Fell
Party	Candidate	Votes	%	±%
Liberal Democrats	Ron Beadle	1,836	59.0	+10.7
Labour	Vincent Edward James Humphries	833	26.8	−10.0
Green	Mark Andrew Gorman	297	9.5	+2.7
Conservative	Paul Sterling	146	4.7	−3.5
Majority		1003	32.2	
Turnout		3124	45.6	
Registered electors		6,846		
Liberal Democrats hold		Swing		

=== Pelaw and Heworth ===
Pelaw and Heworth
Party	Candidate	Votes	%	±%
Liberal Democrats	John Paul Diston	1,202	52.7	+0.4
Labour	Heather Rhoda Maddison	862	37.8	−3.7
Green	Nicholas Boldrini	139	6.1	+6.1
Conservative	Ali Reza Akbari Pargam	76	3.3	−2.9
Majority		340	14.9	+4.1
Turnout		2285	35.6	+1.9
Registered electors		6,427		
Liberal Democrats hold		Swing		

=== Ryton, Crookhill and Stella ===
Ryton, Crookhill and Stella
Party	Candidate	Votes	%	±%
Labour	Alex Geddes	1,545	57.4	−2.3
Green	Andrew Mason	315	11.7	−0.5
Conservative	Susan Mary Wilson	286	10.6	−5.8
Independent	Doug Musgrove	281	10.4	+10.4
Liberal Democrats	Lynda Ann Duggan	215	8.0	−1.7
TUSC	Ros Cooper	48	1.8	−0.3
Majority		1230	45.7	+2.4
Turnout		2699	39.1	+1.3
Registered electors		6,904		
Labour hold		Swing		

=== Saltwell ===
Saltwell
Party	Candidate	Votes	%	±%
Liberal Democrats	Leanne May Brand	900	45.2	+7.1
Labour	Robert Lee Waugh	842	42.3	−6.3
Green	Gabriel Rubinstein	124	6.2	+3.2
Conservative	Robert Ableson	123	6.2	−3.2
Majority		58	2.9	N/A
Turnout		1996	32.4	−1.2
Registered electors		6,165		
Liberal Democrats gain from Labour		Swing		

=== Wardley and Leam Lane ===
Wardley and Leam Lane
Party	Candidate	Votes	%	±%
Labour	John Stuart Green	1,251	66.3	+4.4
Liberal Democrats	Matthew Robert Jordison	338	17.9	+8.1
Conservative	John Robert McNeil	298	15.8	−3.4
Majority		913	48.4	+5.7
Turnout		1898	32.2	−2.6
Registered electors		5,900		
Labour hold		Swing		

=== Whickham North ===
Whickham North
Party	Candidate	Votes	%	±%
Liberal Democrats	Christopher James Ord	1,497	63.9	+2.8
Labour	Jeff Bowe	647	27.6	−1.0
Conservative	John Callanhan	197	8.4	−1.9
Majority		850	36.3	+3.8
Turnout		2341	38.0	+2.1
Registered electors		6,153		
Liberal Democrats hold		Swing		

=== Whickham South and Sunniside ===
Whickham South and Sunniside
Party	Candidate	Votes	%	±%
Liberal Democrats	Jonathan Charles Wallace	1,829	64.3	+4.2
Labour	Sam Daniel Grist	662	23.3	−0.3
Conservative	Perry Wilson	273	9.6	−2.1
TUSC	Joel Jackson Byers	82	2.9	+2.9
Majority		1167	41.0	−4.5
Turnout		2855	43.9	−1.1
Registered electors		6,511		
Liberal Democrats hold		Swing		

=== Windy Nook and Whitehills ===
Windy Nook and Whitehills
Party	Candidate	Votes	%	±%
Labour	Jim Turnbull	1,221	62.2	+3.4
Conservative	Kyle Lambert Murray	353	18.0	−2.1
Liberal Democrats	Susan Walker	253	12.9	−1.8
Green	Ruth Christina Grant	137	7.0	+0.6
Majority		868	44.2	+5.5
Turnout		1976	28.6	−2.3
Registered electors		6,908		
Labour hold		Swing		

=== Winlaton and High Spen ===
Winlaton and High Spen
Party	Candidate	Votes	%	±%
Labour	Maria Theresa Hall	1,441	57.5	+4.1
Conservative	Lewis Ormston	642	25.6	−4.8
Green	Paul Martin McNally	298	11.9	+1.2
Liberal Democrats	David Graham Randall	126	5.0	−0.5
Majority		799	31.9	+8.9
Turnout		2516	36.7	−3.2
Registered electors		6,842		
Labour hold		Swing		
