= 2022 Gateshead Metropolitan Borough Council election =

2022 local election in Gateshead

- 5 May 2022

22 out of 66 seats to Gateshead Metropolitan Borough Council 34 seats needed for a majority
- Turnout: 50,410 (35.3%)

	First party	Second party
Leader	Martin Gannon	Jonathan Wallace
Party	Labour	Liberal Democrats
Last election	52 seats, 46.8%	13 seats, 20.6%
Seats before	52	13
Seats won	17	5
Seats after	51	15
Seat change	▼1	▲2
Popular vote	25,059	12,305
Percentage	49.9%	24.5%
Swing	▲3.1%	▲3.9%
- Winner of each seat at the 2022 Gateshead Metropolitan Borough Council election
Council control before election
Labour
Council control after election
Labour

The 2022 Gateshead Metropolitan Borough Council election took place on 5 May 2022. One third of councillors — 22 out of 66 — on Gateshead Metropolitan Borough Council were elected. The election took place alongside other local elections across the United Kingdom.

In the previous council election in 2021, the Labour Party maintained its longstanding control of the council, holding 52 seats after the election with thirteen Liberal Democrats and one independent.

== Background ==
Result of the council election when these seats were last contested in 2018

Result of the most recent council election in 2021

The Local Government Act 1972 created a two-tier system of metropolitan counties and districts covering Greater Manchester, Merseyside, South Yorkshire, Tyne and Wear, the West Midlands, and West Yorkshire starting in 1974. Gateshead was a district of the Tyne and Wear metropolitan county. The Local Government Act 1985 abolished the metropolitan counties, with metropolitan districts taking on most of their powers as metropolitan boroughs.

Gateshead Council has continuously been under Labour control since its creation. The Liberal Democrats have generally been the main opposition. In the most recent election in 2021, Labour won 19 seats on 46.8% of the vote and the Liberal Democrats won 5 seats on 20.6% of the vote. The Conservatives received 22.5% of the vote and the Green Party received 8.8% of the vote, but neither party won any seats.

Positions up for election in 2022 were last election in 2018. In that election, Labour won 19 seats and the Liberal Democrats won four seats.

== Electoral process ==
The council elects its councillors in thirds, with a third being up for election every year for three years, with no election in the fourth year. The election will take place by first-past-the-post voting, with wards generally being represented by three councillors, with one elected in each election year to serve a four-year term.

All registered electors (British, Irish, Commonwealth and European Union citizens) living in Gateshead aged 18 or over will be entitled to vote in the election. People who live at two addresses in different councils, such as university students with different term-time and holiday addresses, are entitled to be registered for and vote in elections in both local authorities. Voting in-person at polling stations will take place from 07:00 to 22:00 on election day, and voters will be able to apply for postal votes or proxy votes in advance of the election.

== Previous council composition ==
After 2021 election		Before 2022 election	
Party	Seats	Party	Seats
Labour	52	Labour	52
Liberal Democrats	13	Liberal Democrats	13
Independent	1	Independent	1

== Results summary ==
2022 Gateshead Metropolitan Borough Council election
Party	This election			Full council			This election		
Party	Seats	Net	Seats %	Other	Total	Total %	Votes	Votes %	+/−
Labour	17	▼1	77.3	34	51	77.3	25,059	49.9	▲3.1
Liberal Democrats	5	▲2	22.7	10	15	22.7	12,305	24.5	▲3.9
Conservative	0	Steady	0.0	0	0	0.0	8,306	16.5	▼6.0
Green	0	Steady	0.0	0	0	0.0	4,104	8.2	▼0.4
TUSC	0	Steady	0.0	0	0	0.0	315	0.6	▲0.1
Save Us Now	0	Steady	0.0	0	0	0.0	63	0.1	▼0.1
Independent	0	▼1	0.0	0	0	0.0	60	0.1	▼0.3

== Results by ward ==
An asterisk indicates an incumbent councillor.

=== Birtley ===
Birtley
Party	Candidate	Votes	%	±%
Labour	Daniel Weatherley	984	46.4	▼12.9
Liberal Democrats	Paul Elliott	906	42.8	▲22.9
Conservative	Richard Herdman	229	10.8	▼5.7
Majority		78	3.6	▼35.8
Turnout		2,128	34.7	▲3.2
Registered electors		6,127		
Labour hold		Swing	▼17.9	

=== Blaydon ===
Blaydon
Party	Candidate	Votes	%	±%
Labour	Lee-Ann Moir	1,087	52.9	▼15.8
Conservative	Susan Wilson	589	28.7	▲11.7
Green	Ruth Ashford	230	11.2	▲4.1
Liberal Democrats	Kamil Tankiewicz	149	7.3	▲1.7
Majority		498	24.2	▼27.5
Turnout		2,072	29.1	▲0.6
Registered electors		7,112		
Labour hold		Swing	▼13.8	

=== Bridges ===
Bridges
Party	Candidate	Votes	%	±%
Labour	Angela Douglas*	1,013	65.9	▼0.6
Conservative	Martin Backley	271	17.6	▼0.5
Liberal Democrats	Gareth Cooper	253	16.5	▲7.9
Majority		742	48.3	▼0.1
Turnout		1,554	27.2	▲1.4
Registered electors		5,710		
Labour hold		Swing	▼0.05	

=== Chopwell and Rowlands Gill ===
Chopwell and Rowlands Gill
Party	Candidate	Votes	%	±%
Labour	Lynne Caffrey*	1,648	61.7	▼5.8
Conservative	Brian Derrick	520	19.5	▲3.0
Green	John Aspinall	311	11.7	▲2.5
Liberal Democrats	Jean Callender	190	7.1	▲0.3
Majority		1,128	42.2	▼8.8
Turnout		2,676	40.0	▲3.4
Registered electors		6,693		
Labour hold		Swing	▼4.4	

=== Chowdene ===
Chowdene
Party	Candidate	Votes	%	±%
Labour	Maureen Goldsworthy*	1,248	55.1	▼1.5
Conservative	David Potts	463	20.4	▲4.0
Liberal Democrats	Norman Spours	314	13.9	▼2.6
Green	Thomas Newell	175	7.7	▲3.5
TUSC	Marika Smith	66	2.9	▲1.5
Majority		785	34.7	▼5.4
Turnout		2,273	34.3	▲1.4
Labour hold		Swing	▼2.8	
Registered electors		6,619		

=== Crawcrook and Greenside ===
Crawcrook and Greenside
Party	Candidate	Votes	%	±%
Labour	Hugh Kelly*	1,324	45.4	▼12.4
Green	Jack Philipson	913	31.3	▲19.9
Conservative	Christopher Coxon	502	17.2	▼3.5
Liberal Democrats	Oliver Jones-Lyons	177	6.1	▼4.0
Majority		411	14.1	▼23.0
Turnout		2,922	41.2	▼4.7
Labour hold		Swing	▼16.2	
Registered electors		7,090		

=== Deckham ===
Deckham
Party	Candidate	Votes	%	±%
Labour	Martin Gannon*	1,165	59.9	▼4.7
Conservative	Josh Knotts	332	17.1	▼1.1
Green	Gary Rutherford Brooks	200	10.3	▲3.7
Liberal Democrats	Matthew Jordison	173	8.9	▲2.0
TUSC	Norman Hall	75	3.9	▲0.2
Majority		833	42.8	▼3.6
Turnout		1,956	31.0	▲2.1
Labour hold		Swing	▼1.8	
Registered electors		6,317		

=== Dunston and Teams ===
Dunston and Teams
Party	Candidate	Votes	%	±%
Labour	Dot Burnett*	1,057	61.5	▼8.1
Conservative	Jordan-Lee Guthrie	303	17.6	▲2.3
Green	Andy Blanchflower	207	12.0	▲2.5
Liberal Democrats	Beth Gordon	151	8.8	▲3.2
Majority		754	43.9	▼10.4
Turnout		1,722	28.1	▲1.7
Labour hold		Swing	▼5.2	
Registered electors		6,124		

=== Dunston Hill and Whickham East ===
Dunston Hill and Whickham East
Party	Candidate	Votes	%	±%
Liberal Democrats	Amelia Ord	1,232	48.7	▼3.9
Labour	Andrew Moir	809	32.0	▼1.3
Conservative	Jak Hocking	286	11.3	▲4.3
Green	Isabel Blanchflower	157	6.2	▲3.2
Save Us Now	Graham Steele	46	1.8	▼2.4
Majority		423	16.7	▼2.6
Turnout		2,533	38.5	▼5.1
Registered electors		6,587		
Liberal Democrats hold		Swing	▼1.3	

=== Felling ===
Felling
Party	Candidate	Votes	%	±%
Labour	Bill Dick*	932	59.4	▼13.3
Conservative	Peter Jackson	263	16.8	▲2.0
Liberal Democrats	David Fawcett	236	15.0	▲12.6
Green	Neil Grant	138	8.8	New
Majority		669	42.6	▼15.3
Turnout		1,572	28.3	▲0.7
Registered electors		5,556		
Labour hold		Swing	▼7.7	

=== High Fell ===
High Fell
Party	Candidate	Votes	%	±%
Labour	Judith Gibson*	991	58.1	▼7.8
Liberal Democrats	Thomas Holder	284	16.7	▲10.1
Conservative	Francis Athey	245	14.4	▼2.3
TUSC	Elaine Brunskill	117	6.9	▼3.8
Green	Gabriel Rubinstein	68	4.0	New
Majority		707	41.4	▼7.8
Turnout		1,705	28.4	▲2.0
Registered electors		5,994		
Labour hold		Swing	▼9.0	

=== Lamesley ===
Lamesley
Party	Candidate	Votes	%	±%
Labour	Jane McCoid*	1,340	57.8	▼6.1
Conservative	Sheila Everatt	605	26.1	▲4.2
Liberal Democrats	Daniel Clarke	203	8.8	▲2.4
Green	Ashleigh McLean	169	7.3	New
Majority		735	31.7	▼10.3
Turnout		2,325	32.2	▲2.2
Registered electors		7,227		
Labour hold		Swing	▼5.2	

=== Lobley Hill and Bensham ===
Lobley Hill and Bensham
Party	Candidate	Votes	%	±%
Labour	Kevin Dodds*	1,274	59.3	▼2.8
Conservative	John Gardiner	395	18.4	▼0.7
Liberal Democrats	Jamie Rickleton	247	11.5	▲2.7
Green	Andy Redfern	234	10.9	▲0.9
Majority		879	40.9	▼2.1
Turnout		2,164	31.5	▲3.4
Registered electors		6,871		
Labour hold		Swing	▼1.1	

=== Low Fell ===
Low Fell
Party	Candidate	Votes	%	±%
Liberal Democrats	Dawn Welsh	1,549	48.3	▼2.2
Labour	Calvin Lawson	1,179	36.8	▲3.2
Conservative	Paul Sterling	262	8.2	▼2.5
Green	Mark Gorman	217	6.8	▲2.6
Majority		370	11.5	▼5.4
Turnout		3,217	46.7	▲1.2
Registered electors		6,882		
Liberal Democrats hold		Swing	▼2.7	

=== Pelaw and Heworth ===
Pelaw and Heworth
Party	Candidate	Votes	%	±%
Liberal Democrats	Amanda Wintcher	1,255	52.3	▲8.9
Labour	Anne Wheeler	995	41.5	▼6.6
Conservative	Ali Pargam	149	6.2	▼2.2
Majority		260	10.8	▲6.1
Turnout		2,412	37.5	▲3.9
Registered electors		6,438		
Liberal Democrats gain from Labour		Swing	▲7.8	

=== Ryton, Crookhill and Stella ===
Ryton, Crookhill and Stella
Party	Candidate	Votes	%	±%
Labour	Freda Geddes*	1,650	59.7	▲34.7
Conservative	Louise Prince	452	16.4	▲12.3
Green	Andrew Mason	336	12.2	▲9.5
Liberal Democrats	Lynda Duggan	267	9.7	▼12.5
TUSC	Ros Cooper	57	2.1	▲1.2
Majority		1,198	43.3	▲40.5
Turnout		2,776	40.4	▲3.1
Registered electors		6,872		
Labour hold		Swing	▲11.2	

=== Saltwell ===
Saltwell
Party	Candidate	Votes	%	±%
Labour	John Adams*	984	48.6	▼13.6
Liberal Democrats	Leanne Brand	771	38.1	▲29.4
Conservative	Robert Ableson	191	9.4	▼11.3
Independent	Rachel Mary Cabral	60	3.0	New
Save Us Now	Craig Gallagher	17	0.8	New
Majority		213	10.5	▼31.0
Turnout		2,032	33.6	▲4.0
Registered electors		6,050		
Labour hold		Swing	▼21.5	

=== Wardley and Leam Lane ===
Wardley and Leam Lane
Party	Candidate	Votes	%	±%
Labour	Sharron Potts	1,275	61.9	▼2.9
Conservative	John McNeil	395	19.2	▼1.0
Liberal Democrats	Robinson Stanaway	203	9.8	▲0.7
Green	Alan Price	188	9.1	▲3.2
Majority		880	42.7	▼1.9
Turnout		2,072	34.8	▲3.1
Registered electors		5,956		
Labour hold		Swing	▼1.0	

=== Whickham North ===
Whickham North
Party	Candidate	Votes	%	±%
Liberal Democrats	Peter Craig*	1,510	61.1	▲1.0
Labour	Jeff Bowe	707	28.6	▼1.3
Conservative	John Callanan	255	10.3	▲0.4
Majority		803	32.5	▲2.3
Turnout		2,479	40.1	▼0.4
Registered electors		6,183		
Liberal Democrats hold		Swing	▲1.2	

=== Whickham South and Sunniside ===
Whickham South and Sunniside
Party	Candidate	Votes	%	±%
Liberal Democrats	Marilynn Ord*	1,770	60.1	▼6.6
Labour	Michael Hall	695	23.6	▲1.4
Conservative	Perry Wilson	346	11.7	▲0.7
Green	Helen McDonald	136	4.6	New
Majority		1,075	36.5	▼8.0
Turnout		2,955	45.0	▼0.7
Registered electors		6,567		
Liberal Democrats hold		Swing	▼4.0	

=== Windy Nook and Whitehills ===
Windy Nook and Whitehills
Party	Candidate	Votes	%	±%
Labour	Tom Graham*	1,259	58.8	▼12.5
Conservative	Kyle Murray	430	20.1	▲0.5
Liberal Democrats	Susan Walker	315	14.7	▲5.5
Green	Ruth Grant	137	6.4	New
Majority		829	38.7	▼13.0
Turnout		2,156	30.9	▲2.0
Registered electors		6,976		
Labour hold		Swing	▼6.5	

=== Winlaton and High Spen ===
Winlaton and High Spen
Party	Candidate	Votes	%	±%
Labour	Pamela Burns*	1,443	53.4	▼11.0
Conservative	Lewis Ormston	823	30.4	▲9.4
Green	Paul McNally	288	10.7	▲3.7
Liberal Democrats	David Randall	150	5.5	▼2.1
Majority		620	23.0	▼20.4
Turnout		2,709	39.9	▲3.6
Registered electors		6,781		
Labour hold		Swing	▼10.2	
