= 2019 Gateshead Metropolitan Borough Council election =

2019 local election in Gateshead

- 2 May 2019

22 out of 66 seats to Gateshead Metropolitan Borough Council 34 seats needed for a majority
- Turnout: 47,080 (32.7%)

	First party	Second party
Leader	Martin Gannon	Jonathan Wallace
Party	Labour	Liberal Democrats
Seats before	54	12
Seats won	17	5
Seats after	52	14
Seat change	▼2	▲2
Popular vote	20,609	12,458
Percentage	44.5%	26.9%
- Map showing the results of the 2019 Gateshead Metropolitan Borough Council election
Council control before election
{{{before_election}}}
Labour
Council control after election
Labour

The 2019 Gateshead Metropolitan Borough Council election took place on 2 May 2019 to elect members of the Gateshead Metropolitan Borough Council in England. It was held on the same day as other local elections.

== Results summary ==
2019 Gateshead Metropolitan Borough Council election
Party	This election			Full council			This election		
Party	Seats	Net	Seats %	Other	Total	Total %	Votes	Votes %	+/−
Labour	17	▼2	77.3	35	52	78.8	20,609	44.5	
Liberal Democrats	5	▲2	22.7	9	14	21.2	12,458	26.9	
Conservative	0	Steady	0.0	0	0	0.0	4,940	10.7	
Green	0	Steady	0.0	0	0	0.0	3,956	8.5	
UKIP	0	Steady	0.0	0	0	0.0	2,857	6.2	
Liberal	0	Steady	0.0	0	0	0.0	722	1.6	
Save Us Now	0	Steady	0.0	0	0	0.0	396	0.9	
Independent	0	Steady	0.0	0	0	0.0	104	0.2	
Socialist Alternative	0	Steady	0.0	0	0	0.0	188	0.4	
Space Navies Party	0	Steady	0.0	0	0	0.0	133	0.3	

== Ward results ==
=== Birtley ===
Birtley
Party	Candidate	Votes	%	±%
Labour	Neil Weatherley	750	38.3	
Liberal	Kathy King	414	21.1	
UKIP	James Corr	335	17.1	
Liberal Democrats	Paul Elliott	315	16.1	
Conservative	Caroline Sterling	146	7.4	
Majority		336	17.1	
Turnout		1,973	31.8	
Registered electors		6,204		
Labour hold		Swing		

=== Blaydon ===
Blaydon
Party	Candidate	Votes	%	±%
Labour	Malcolm Brain	1,102	55.6	
Green	Simon Easton	378	19.1	
Conservative	Michael Leonard	223	11.3	
Liberal Democrats	Stuart McClurey	146	7.4	
Space Navies Party	Lisabela Marschild	133	6.7	
Majority		724	36.5	
Turnout		2,022	28.3	
Registered electors		7,138		
Labour hold		Swing		

=== Bridges ===
Bridges
Party	Candidate	Votes	%	±%
Labour	Bob Goldsworthy	832	61.3	
Liberal Democrats	Gareth Cooper	316	23.3	
Conservative	John Gardiner	209	15.4	
Majority		516	38.0	
Turnout		1,394	24.4	
Registered electors		5,703		
Labour hold		Swing		

=== Chopwell and Rowlands Gill ===
Chopwell and Rowlands Gill
Party	Candidate	Votes	%	±%
Labour	Michael McNestry	1,269	48.9	
UKIP	John Brown	507	19.5	
Green	David Castleton	328	12.6	
Conservative	Lucinda Wilson	250	9.6	
Liberal Democrats	Jean Callender	242	9.3	
Majority		762	29.4	
Turnout		2,612	38.6	
Registered electors		6,772		
Labour hold		Swing		

=== Chowdene ===
Chowdene
Party	Candidate	Votes	%	±%
Labour	Keith Wood	1,025	47.3	
UKIP	John O'Carroll	449	20.7	
Liberal Democrats	Dawn Welsh	421	19.4	
Conservative	Eric Young	271	12.5	
Majority		576	26.6	
Turnout		2,187	31.8	
Registered electors		6,879		
Labour hold		Swing		

=== Crawcrook and Greenside ===
Crawcrook and Greenside
Party	Candidate	Votes	%	±%
Labour	Helen Haran	1,049	41.5	
Green	Diane Cadman	653	25.8	
UKIP	Morgan Little	395	15.6	
Conservative	Leonard Davidson	249	9.8	
Liberal Democrats	Amelia Ord	182	7.2	
Majority		396	15.7	
Turnout		2,539	37.5	
Registered electors		6,776		
Labour hold		Swing		

=== Deckham ===
Deckham
Party	Candidate	Votes	%	±%
Labour	Bernadette Oliphant	1,017	57.8	
Green	Gary Brooks	292	16.6	
Conservative	May Ainscow	243	13.8	
Liberal Democrats	Norman Spours	207	11.8	
Majority		725	41.2	
Turnout		1,792	27.8	
Registered electors		6,447		
Labour hold		Swing		

=== Dunston and Teams ===
Dunston and Teams
Party	Candidate	Votes	%	±%
Labour	Gary Haley	887	58.6	
Green	Andrew Blanchflower	233	15.4	
Conservative	Jordan-Lee Guthrie	161	10.6	
Liberal Democrats	Stacey Duggan	125	8.3	
Save Us Now	Susan Hall	108	7.1	
Majority		654	43.2	
Turnout		1,543	24.7	
Registered electors		6,258		
Labour hold		Swing		

=== Dunston Hill and Whickham East ===
Dunston Hill and Whickham East
Party	Candidate	Votes	%	±%
Liberal Democrats	Vicky Anderson	1,488	52.7	
Labour Co-op	Chris McHugh	851	30.1	
Green	Isabel Blanchflower	207	7.3	
Save Us Now	Graham Steele	146	5.2	
Conservative	Jak Hocking	133	4.7	
Majority		637	22.5	
Turnout		2,843	42.5	
Registered electors		6,687		
Liberal Democrats gain from Labour		Swing		

=== Felling ===
Felling
Party	Candidate	Votes	%	±%
Labour	Paul McNally	899	64.1	
Liberal Democrats	David Fawcett	324	23.1	
Conservative	Peter Jackson	180	12.8	
Majority		575	41.0	
Turnout		1,433	24.9	
Registered electors		5,751		
Labour hold		Swing		

=== High Fell ===
High Fell
Party	Candidate	Votes	%	±%
Labour	Jennifer Reay	828	56.4	
Conservative	Edward Bohill	187	12.7	
Liberal Democrats	Lynda Duggan	178	12.1	
Save Us Now	Heather White	142	9.7	
Socialist Alternative	Elaine Brunskill	133	9.1	
Majority		641	43.7	
Turnout		1,489	24.4	
Registered electors		6,110		
Labour hold		Swing		

=== Lamesley ===
Lamesley
Party	Candidate	Votes	%	±%
Labour	Sheila Gallagher	1,019	52.8	
Conservative	Sheila Everatt	407	21.1	
Liberal	Betty Gallon	308	16.0	
Liberal Democrats	Christine McHatton	197	10.2	
Majority		612	31.7	
Turnout		1,998	27.6	
Registered electors		7,241		
Labour hold		Swing		

=== Lobley Hill and Bensham ===
Lobley Hill and Bensham
Party	Candidate	Votes	%	±%
Labour	Eileen McMaster	963	49.0	
Liberal Democrats	Nicholas Seaborn	345	17.5	
Green	Andy Redfern	288	14.6	
Conservative	Janice Hutchinson	266	13.5	
Independent	Jonathan Mohammed	104	5.3	
Majority		618	31.4	
Turnout		2,006	28.7	
Registered electors		7,000		
Labour hold		Swing		

=== Low Fell ===
Low Fell
Party	Candidate	Votes	%	±%
Liberal Democrats	Ron Beadle	1,778	57.9	
Labour	Calvin Lawson	811	26.4	
Green	Neil Grant	291	9.5	
Conservative	David Potts	190	6.2	
Majority		967	31.5	
Turnout		3,114	44.9	
Registered electors		6,943		
Liberal Democrats hold		Swing		

=== Pelaw and Heworth ===
Pelaw and Heworth
Party	Candidate	Votes	%	±%
Liberal Democrats	John Diston	1,222	51.5	
Labour	Jill Green	726	30.6	
UKIP	Jordan Oliver	238	10.0	
Green	Nicholas Boldrini	127	5.3	
Conservative	Paul Sterling	61	2.6	
Majority		496	20.9	
Turnout		2,383	36.9	
Registered electors		6,452		
Liberal Democrats gain from Labour		Swing		

=== Ryton, Crookhill and Stella ===
Ryton, Crookhill and Stella
Party	Candidate	Votes	%	±%
Labour	Alex Geddes	1,399	49.2	
UKIP	Steven Bailey	502	17.7	
Liberal Democrats	Sandra McClurey	496	17.4	
Conservative	Susan Wilson	205	7.2	
Green	Andrew Mason	186	6.5	
Socialist Alternative	Ros Cooper	55	1.9	
Majority		897	31.6	
Turnout		2,856	41.3	
Registered electors		6,907		
Labour hold		Swing		

=== Saltwell ===
Saltwell
Party	Candidate	Votes	%	±%
Labour	Robert Waugh	838	51.1	
Conservative	Alan Bond	317	19.3	
Green	Rachel Taylor	278	17.0	
Liberal Democrats	Leanne Brand	207	12.6	
Majority		521	31.8	
Turnout		1,667	27.8	
Registered electors		6,000		
Labour hold		Swing		

=== Wardley and Leam Lane ===
Wardley and Leam Lane
Party	Candidate	Votes	%	±%
Labour	John Green	1,034	53.9	
UKIP	Alan Craig	431	22.5	
Liberal Democrats	Susan Walker	262	13.7	
Conservative	John McNeil	190	9.9	
Majority		603	31.5	
Turnout		1,936	31.6	
Registered electors		6,119		
Labour hold		Swing		

=== Whickham North ===
Whickham North
Party	Candidate	Votes	%	±%
Liberal Democrats	Christopher Ord	1,637	70.4	
Labour	Jeff Bowe	524	22.5	
Conservative	John Callanan	164	7.1	
Majority		1,113	47.9	
Turnout		2,373	37.7	
Registered electors		6,299		
Liberal Democrats hold		Swing		

=== Whickham South and Sunniside ===
Whickham South and Sunniside
Party	Candidate	Votes	%	±%
Liberal Democrats	Jonathan Wallace	1,917	72.9	
Labour Co-op	Judith Turner	479	18.2	
Conservative	Perry Wilson	232	8.8	
Majority		1,438	54.7	
Turnout		2,676	41.5	
Registered electors		6,451		
Liberal Democrats hold		Swing		

=== Windy Nook and Whitehills ===
Windy Nook and Whitehills
Party	Candidate	Votes	%	±%
Labour	Jim Turnbull	1,117	58.4	
Liberal Democrats	Karen Crozier	274	14.3	
Green	Ruth Grant	274	14.3	
Conservative	Kyle Murray	248	13.0	
Majority		843	44.1	
Turnout		1,978	27.8	
Registered electors		7,112		
Labour hold		Swing		

=== Winlaton and High Spen ===
Winlaton and High Spen
Party	Candidate	Votes	%	±%
Labour	Maria Hall	1,190	54.1	
Green	Paul McNally	421	19.2	
Conservative	Lewis Ormston	408	18.6	
Liberal Democrats	Robinson Stanaway	179	8.1	
Majority		769	35.0	
Turnout		2,266	33.4	
Registered electors		6,793		
Labour hold		Swing		

== Changes 2019–2021 ==
- December 2019: Neil Weatherley (Labour, Birtley) died, aged 64, on 12 December 2019. Due to the COVID-19 pandemic and the Coronavirus Act 2020, by-elections were suspended and the vacancy was held over to the 2021 election.
- December 2019: Mary Foy (Labour, Lamesley) stood down after being elected Member of Parliament for the City of Durham in the 2019 general election. Due to the COVID-19 pandemic and the Coronavirus Act 2020, by-elections were suspended and the vacancy was held over to the 2021 election.
