= 2008 Gateshead Metropolitan Borough Council election =

2008 English local government election

Map of the 2008 Gateshead Metropolitan Borough Council election

The 2008 Gateshead Metropolitan Borough Council election took place on 1 May 2008 to elect a third of the members of Gateshead Metropolitan Borough Council, the council of Gateshead in England. This was on the same day as the other 2008 United Kingdom local elections. The previous council election took place in 2007 and the following election was held in 2010. In the election, the council stayed under Labour control.

== Results ==
Party	Previous	Seats +/-	2008
Labour	42	▼1	41
Liberal Democrats	23	▲1	24
Liberal	1	Steady	1

== See also ==
- Gateshead Metropolitan Borough Council elections
