= 2003 Gateshead Metropolitan Borough Council election =

2003 UK local government election

The 2003 Gateshead Borough Council election was held on 1 May 2003 to elect members of Gateshead Council in Tyne and Wear, England. One third of the council was up for election and the Labour Party kept overall control of the council.

After the election, the composition of the council was:

- Labour 46
- Liberal Democrat 19
- Liberal 1

== Campaign ==
The Labour Party feared that the Iraq War would cause them to lose ground in the election, after even their own councillors in Gateshead had passed a motion in February opposing the war. Labour hoped to separate the election from national issues by focusing on the council's record including the fact that council was rated as excellent in national league tables. The Liberal Democrats focused their attacks on the level of Council Tax including the 9.8% rise for Gateshead in 2003.

The main battleground was seen as being in Winlaton ward which the Liberal Democrats had won in the 2000 election but Labour had retained in 2002. As well as the two main parties on the council, the Conservatives contested all wards, while the British National Party put up 8 candidates and the Green Party 3 candidates.

As in the previous election in 2002 the election was held under all postal voting. As a result, overall turnout was 54.67% in Gateshead, which was the third highest turnout in the 2003 United Kingdom local elections with only the elections in Hertfordshire and Copeland seeing a higher turnout.

== Election result ==
The results saw no seats change hands between the parties with the Labour Party pleased at managing to hold all of the seats they were defending. The result was seen as a blow to the Liberal Democrats chances of taking the Blaydon parliamentary seat at the next general election.

Gateshead local election result 2003
Party	Seats	Gains	Losses	Net gain/loss	Seats %	Votes %	Votes	+/−
Labour	16	0	0	0	72.7	54.2	43,686	-2.7
Liberal Democrats	6	0	0	0	27.3	29.7	23,964	+1.0
Conservative	0	0	0	0	0.0	8.4	6,824	-0.3
BNP	0	0	0	0	0.0	3.7	2,955	+2.7
Liberal	0	0	0	0	0.0	3.0	2,437	-0.1
Green	0	0	0	0	0.0	0.7	598	-0.2
Socialist Alliance	0	0	0	0	0.0	0.2	135	+0.1

== Ward results ==
Bede
Party	Candidate	Votes	%	±%
Labour	Patricia Murray	1,539	67.6	−8.7
BNP	Kevin Bell	307	13.5	+13.5
Liberal Democrats	Colin Ball	287	12.6	−3.6
Conservative	Ruth Fearby	144	6.3	−1.1
Majority		1,232	54.1	−6.0
Turnout		2,277		
Labour hold		Swing		

Bensham
Party	Candidate	Votes	%	±%
Labour	Kevin Dodds	1,613	69.4	−1.4
Liberal Democrats	Susan Armstrong	244	10.5	+0.7
BNP	Terence Armstrong	209	9.0	+2.1
Conservative	Ada Callanan	190	8.2	−1.3
Socialist Alliance	David Morton	67	2.9	−0.1
Majority		1,369	58.9	−2.1
Turnout		2,323		
Labour hold		Swing		

Birtley
Party	Candidate	Votes	%	±%
Labour	Paul Foy	1,753	52.0	−1.2
Liberal	Mark Davidson	1,415	42.0	+1.2
Conservative	Barbara Nye	204	6.0	+0.0
Majority		338	10.0	−2.4
Turnout		3,372		
Labour hold		Swing		

Blaydon
Party	Candidate	Votes	%	±%
Labour	Elsdon Watson	2,003	63.9	−0.6
Liberal Democrats	Maxine Thompson	879	28.0	+0.3
Conservative	Mark Watson	254	8.1	+0.3
Majority		1,124	35.9	−0.9
Turnout		3,136		
Labour hold		Swing		

Chopwell and Rowlands Gill
Party	Candidate	Votes	%	±%
Labour	Michael McNestry	2,624	62.1	+4.4
Liberal Democrats	Eileen Blythe	991	23.4	−4.6
Conservative	Leonard Davidson	312	7.4	+0.1
Green	Pamela Woolner	300	7.1	+0.2
Majority		1,633	38.7	+9.0
Turnout		4,227		
Labour hold		Swing		

Chowdene
Party	Candidate	Votes	%	±%
Labour	Keith Wood	2,609	68.5	−0.6
Conservative	Raymond Swadling	646	17.0	+0.6
Liberal Democrats	Glenys Goodwill	552	14.5	+0.0
Majority		1,963	51.5	−1.2
Turnout		3,807		
Labour hold		Swing		

Crawcrook and Greenside
Party	Candidate	Votes	%	±%
Liberal Democrats	Sally Danys	1,995	46.7	−5.5
Labour	Jack Graham	1,746	40.9	−1.7
Conservative	David Moor	331	7.8	+2.6
Green	Duncan Couchman	198	4.6	+4.6
Majority		249	5.8	−3.8
Turnout		4,270		
Liberal Democrats hold		Swing		

Deckham
Party	Candidate	Votes	%	±%
Labour	Martin Gannon	1,615	57.6	−10.5
Liberal Democrats	Ceila Wraith	450	16.1	−0.5
BNP	Ronald Fairlamb	441	15.7	+15.7
Conservative	Karl Gatiss	296	10.6	−4.7
Majority		1,165	41.5	−10.0
Turnout		2,802		
Labour hold		Swing		

Dunston
Party	Candidate	Votes	%	±%
Labour	Albert Brooks	2,753	68.0	−0.7
Liberal Democrats	Anne Murray	552	13.6	+2.9
Conservative	John Callanan	392	9.7	−0.5
BNP	Daniel Dafter	352	8.7	+8.7
Majority		2,201	54.4	−3.6
Turnout		4,049		
Labour hold		Swing		

Felling
Party	Candidate	Votes	%	±%
Labour	Raymond Napier	1,967	67.7	−10.0
BNP	John Battersby	405	13.9	+13.9
Liberal Democrats	David Lucas	334	11.5	+0.6
Conservative	Trevor Murray	198	6.8	−4.6
Majority		1,562	53.8	−12.5
Turnout		2,904		
Labour hold		Swing		

High Fell
Party	Candidate	Votes	%	±%
Labour	Malcolm Graham	2,226	72.5	+3.2
Liberal Democrats	Elizabeth Bird	427	13.9	+5.5
BNP	Kevin Scott	237	7.7	+7.7
Conservative	June Murray	181	5.9	+0.1
Majority		1,799	58.6	+5.8
Turnout		3,071		
Labour hold		Swing		

Lamesley
Party	Candidate	Votes	%	±%
Labour	Craig Harrison	1,954	59.2	+0.3
Liberal	Susan Davidson	1,022	31.0	−2.3
Conservative	Karen Sludden	322	9.8	+1.9
Majority		932	28.2	+2.6
Turnout		3,298		
Labour hold		Swing		

Leam
Party	Candidate	Votes	%	±%
Labour	Paul Tinnion	2,475	69.3	−4.6
Liberal Democrats	Norman Spours	694	19.4	+2.3
Conservative	John McNeil	402	11.3	+2.3
Majority		1,781	49.9	−6.9
Turnout		3,571		
Labour hold		Swing		

Low Fell
Party	Candidate	Votes	%	±%
Liberal Democrats	Frank Hindle	2,875	61.6	+3.8
Labour	Peter Wilson	1,280	27.4	−2.4
Conservative	Paul Sterling	515	11.0	−1.4
Majority		1,595	34.2	+6.2
Turnout		4,670		
Liberal Democrats hold		Swing		

Pelaw and Heworth
Party	Candidate	Votes	%	±%
Liberal Democrats	Ian Patterson	2,215	55.7	+6.9
Labour	Robert Goldsworthy	1,531	38.5	−8.5
Conservative	Maureen Moor	129	3.2	−1.0
Green	Nicholas Boldrini	100	2.5	+2.5
Majority		684	17.2	+15.4
Turnout		3,975		
Liberal Democrats hold		Swing		

Ryton
Party	Candidate	Votes	%	±%
Liberal Democrats	Ione Rippeth	2,960	66.0	+4.4
Labour	Dane Roberts	1,279	28.5	−4.7
Conservative	Antoinette Sterling	248	5.5	+0.3
Majority		1,681	37.5	+9.1
Turnout		4,487		
Liberal Democrats hold		Swing		

Saltwell
Party	Candidate	Votes	%	±%
Labour	Ian Mearns	1,793	63.0	−2.3
Liberal Democrats	Paul Cowie	420	14.8	+2.2
BNP	George Bainbridge	355	12.5	+1.5
Conservative	Elaine McMaster	279	9.8	−1.4
Majority		1,373	48.2	−4.5
Turnout		2,847		
Labour hold		Swing		

Teams
Party	Candidate	Votes	%	±%
Labour	Margaret Duddin	2,362	62.7	−4.6
BNP	Michael Dafter	649	17.2	+8.8
Liberal Democrats	James Blythe	463	12.3	−1.3
Conservative	Margaret Bell	292	7.8	−2.7
Majority		1,899	45.5	−8.2
Turnout		3,766		
Labour hold		Swing		

Whickham North
Party	Candidate	Votes	%	±%
Liberal Democrats	Mary Wallace	2,470	54.0	+5.2
Labour	Frank Earl	1,719	37.6	−5.8
Conservative	Elaine Robertson	383	8.4	+0.6
Majority		751	16.4	+11.0
Turnout		4,572		
Liberal Democrats hold		Swing		

Whickham South
Party	Candidate	Votes	%	±%
Liberal Democrats	Jonathan Wallace	2,901	55.0	−3.5
Labour	Gary Haley	1,804	34.2	+3.4
Conservative	Peter Ross	567	10.8	+0.1
Majority		1,097	20.8	−6.9
Turnout		5,272		
Liberal Democrats hold		Swing		

Winlaton
Party	Candidate	Votes	%	±%
Labour	George Wilson	2,000	53.4	−0.4
Liberal Democrats	Peter Stokel	1,545	41.3	−0.7
Conservative	Charles Sludden	199	5.3	+1.1
Majority		455	12.1	+0.3
Turnout		3,744		
Labour hold		Swing		

Wrekendyke
Party	Candidate	Votes	%	±%
Labour	Linda Green	3,041	73.1	−2.7
Liberal Democrats	John Diston	710	17.1	+1.8
Conservative	Eleanor Steeley	340	8.2	−0.6
Socialist Alliance	Angela Makki	68	1.6	+1.6
Majority		2,331	56.0	−4.5
Turnout		4,159		
Labour hold		Swing		

Preceded by 2002 Gateshead Council election	Gateshead local elections	Succeeded by 2004 Gateshead Council election
