= Dunston Hill Hospital =

- Gateshead Health NHS Foundation Trust
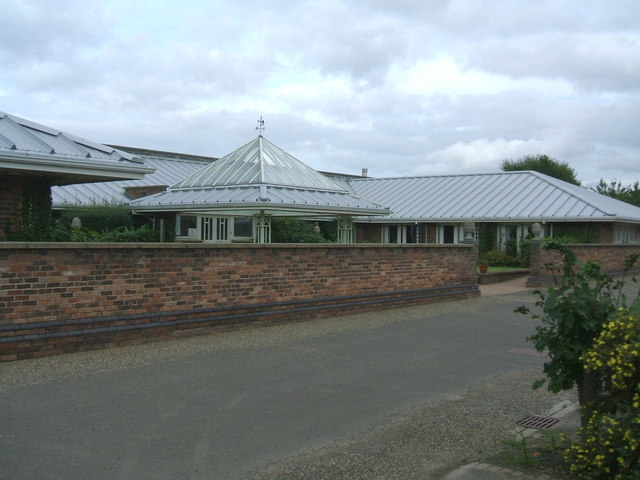
- Dunston Hill Hospital

- Shown in Tyne and Wear

Geography
- Location: Gateshead, United Kingdom
- Coordinates: 54.9463°N 1.6588°W

Organisation
- Care system: Public NHS
- Type: General

History
- Founded: 1928
- Closed: 2012

Links
- Website: www.qegateshead.nhs.uk
- Lists: Hospitals in the United Kingdom

Dunston Hill Hospital was a hospital in Gateshead, Tyne and Wear. It was managed by Gateshead Health NHS Foundation Trust.

== History ==
The hospital had its origins in Dunston Hill House, a property which was built for John Carr in the early 18th century and which became the home of the Carr-Ellison family. It was acquired by the Ministry of Pensions which relocated a facility for war pensioners, originally located at Castle Leazes, to the site in 1928. The hospital remained under the control of the Ministry of Pensions until 1953 when it passed to the control of the Ministry of Health, but it was not absorbed into the National Health Service until 1 April 1956. Although much of the site, including the main house, was sold for redevelopment in the early 21st century, a modern-day hospital was built on the site and continued to operate until June 2012.
