= Gateshead Health NHS Foundation Trust =

Healthcare trust in England

- Type: NHS hospital trust
- Budget: £190 million 2012/3
- Hospitals: Queen Elizabeth Hospital, Gateshead
- Chair: Julia Hickey
- Chief executive: Trudie Davies
- Website: www.qegateshead.nhs.uk

Gateshead Health NHS Foundation Trust runs the Queen Elizabeth Hospital, Gateshead, QE Metro Riverside and some services at Bensham Hospital, within Gateshead, Tyne and Wear, England. They also run services from Blaydon Primary Care Centre and Washington Primary Care Centre.

In November 2013 it was announced that the Trust had selected BridgeHead Software a Healthcare Data Management company to implement its Vendor Neutral Archive for a multi-staged image management project as part of the development of a comprehensive electronic patient record system.

In 2014 the trust established a subsidiary company, QE Facilities Ltd, to which 564 estates and facilities staff were transferred. The intention was to achieve VAT benefits, as well as pay bill savings, by recruiting new staff on less expensive non-NHS contracts. VAT benefits arise because NHS trusts can only claim VAT back on a small subset of goods and services they buy. The Value Added Tax Act 1994 provides a mechanism through which NHS trusts can qualify for refunds on contracted out services.

The trust was placed second by Macmillan Cancer Support in a league table ranking cancer patients' experience across England in September 2014.

The trust spent £3.2 million on agency staff in 2014/5. It expects a deficit of £7.5 million for 2015/6.

In 2022 it was recognised as a Global Digital Exemplar leader.

It set up a pharmacist-led clinic for patients with both heart failure and diabetes, to optimise their medications in 2022.

== See also ==
- List of NHS trusts
