= 2004 Gateshead Metropolitan Borough Council election =

2004 UK local government election

Results of the 2004 Gateshead Metropolitan Borough Council election

The 2004 Gateshead Borough Council election was held on 10 June 2004 to elect members of Gateshead Council in Tyne and Wear, England. The whole council was up for election with boundary changes since the last election in 2003. The Labour Party stayed in overall control of the council.

== Campaign ==
The boundary changes kept the number of wards and seats on the council unchanged while changing many of the wards. In total 216 candidates stood in the election, with the Labour and Conservative parties standing for all of the seats. The Liberal Democrats stood in all but two wards where the Liberal Party stood instead. There were also 17 British National Party candidates and one Independent.

The council was expected to remain under Labour control as it had been for the previous 30 years but the Liberal Democrats hoped to make gains. Labour called on voters to re-elect them in order to keep the services provided by the council improving. The Liberal Democrats claimed that a local maternity unit and library were under threat of being closed but Labour accused them of scaremongering. Local businessman Sir John Hall called on voters to re-elect the Labour council in order that a partnership with Newcastle council could continue.

Printing problems meant that ballot papers for the election, which was held with all postal voting, were about a week late in being sent out with 150,000 ballots having to be reprinted. As a result, extra printers were used and ballot boxes were placed in local libraries.

== Election result ==
Gateshead local election result 2004
Party	Seats	Gains	Losses	Net gain/loss	Seats %	Votes %	Votes	+/−
Labour	43			-3	65.2	48.5	89,861	-5.7
Liberal Democrats	22			+3	33.3	34.4	63,801	+4.7
Liberal	1			0	1.5	3.4	6,272	+0.4
Conservative	0			0	0.0	10.1	18,719	+1.7
BNP	0			0	0.0	2.9	5,315	-0.8
Independent	0			0	0.0	0.4	651	+0.4

== Resulting Council Composition ==
Party	Seats			Council Composition 10 June 2004
Party	2002	2003	2004	Council Composition 10 June 2004
Labour	46	46	43	
Liberal Democrats	19	19	22	
Liberal	1	1	1	

== Ward results ==
Birtley (3)
Party	Candidate	Votes	%	±%
Liberal	Sarah King	1,694		
Labour	Neil Weatherley	1,305		
Labour	Paul Foy	1,237		
Liberal	Betty Gallon	1,227		
Liberal	Henry Reid	1,175		
Labour	Mary Foy (politician)	1,117		
Conservative	Karen Sludden	230		
Conservative	Henry Justice	222		
Conservative	Angela Monaghan	204		
Turnout		8,411	48.0	

Blaydon (3)
Party	Candidate	Votes	%	±%
Labour	Elsdon Watson	1,484		
Labour	Malcolm Brain	1,461		
Labour	Kathryn Ferdinand	1,355		
Liberal Democrats	June McFarling	865		
Liberal Democrats	Richard Rook	768		
Liberal Democrats	Maxine Thompson	743		
Conservative	Mark Watson	295		
BNP	James Lovatt-McLeish	248		
Conservative	Elizabeth Wraith	233		
Conservative	John Wraith	219		
Turnout		7,671	41.9	

Bridges (3)
Party	Candidate	Votes	%	±%
Labour	John Eagle	968		
Labour	Patricia Murray	949		
Labour	Kenneth Childs	925		
Liberal Democrats	Bernard Shepherd	413		
Liberal Democrats	Claire Cowie	391		
Liberal Democrats	Colin Ball	346		
BNP	Kevin Bell	277		
Conservative	Diana Moore	206		
Conservative	Ruth Fearby	195		
Conservative	Joan Weihe	172		
Turnout		4,842	38.1	

Chopwell and Rowlands Gill (3)
Party	Candidate	Votes	%	±%
Labour	John Hamilton	2,096		
Labour	Michael McNestry	2,073		
Labour	Maureen Chaplin	1,939		
Liberal Democrats	Raymond Callender	1,050		
Liberal Democrats	Eileen Blythe	1,016		
Liberal Democrats	Mary Heslop	821		
Conservative	James Arthur	358		
Conservative	Lilian Arthur	341		
Conservative	Jeanne Waton	339		
BNP	Kenneth Hutton	245		
Turnout		10,278	53.3	

Chowdene (3)
Party	Candidate	Votes	%	±%
Labour	John McElroy	2,014		
Labour	Keith Wood	1,908		
Labour	Maureen Goldsworthy	1,749		
Conservative	Michael Crossman	710		
Liberal Democrats	Susan Craig	644		
Liberal Democrats	Glenys Goodwill	587		
Liberal Democrats	Ian Ball	532		
Conservative	Peter Lennon	512		
BNP	Peter Stewart	343		
Conservative	June Murray	204		
Turnout		9,203	50.3	

Crawcrook and Greenside (3)
Party	Candidate	Votes	%	±%
Liberal Democrats	Noel Rippeth	1,751		
Liberal Democrats	Derek Anderson	1,704		
Liberal Democrats	Sally Danys	1,635		
Labour	Jack Graham	1,200		
Labour	Judith Brown	1,173		
Labour	Paul Mitchinson	1,091		
Conservative	Leonard Davidson	246		
Conservative	Daniel Duggan	229		
Conservative	Lynda Duggan	219		
Turnout		9,248	51.0	

Deckham (3)
Party	Candidate	Votes	%	±%
Labour	Brian Coates	1,276		
Labour	June Joyce	1,244		
Labour	Martin Gannon	1,180		
Liberal Democrats	Ann McCarthy	626		
Liberal Democrats	Grace Purdie	517		
Liberal Democrats	George Conder	477		
BNP	Kevin Scott	448		
Conservative	Allan Davidson	344		
Conservative	David Moor	328		
Conservative	Maureen Moor	291		
Turnout		6,731	39.9	

Dunston and Teams (3)
Party	Candidate	Votes	%	±%
Labour	David Bollands	1,252		
Labour	Maureen Clelland	1,198		
Labour	Patrick Rice	1,180		
Liberal Democrats	Samantha Harrison	455		
BNP	Michael Dafter	444		
Liberal Democrats	Anne Murray	342		
Liberal Democrats	Elizabeth Robson	308		
Conservative	Margaret Bell	238		
Conservative	Peter Callanan	216		
Conservative	Charles Heslop	169		
Turnout		5,785	39.8	

Dunston Hill and Whickham East (3)
Party	Candidate	Votes	%	±%
Liberal Democrats	Peter Maughan	1,620		
Liberal Democrats	Yvonne McNicol	1,552		
Liberal Democrats	Allison Chatto	1,512		
Labour	Frank Earl	1,392		
Labour	Pauline Dillon	1,377		
Labour	Margaret Duddin	1,343		
Conservative	John Callanan	326		
BNP	David Dafter	315		
Conservative	George Walker	294		
Conservative	Josephine Walker	259		
Turnout		9,990	54.2	

Felling (3)
Party	Candidate	Votes	%	±%
Labour	Raymon Napier	1,532		
Labour	John Hird	1,528		
Labour	William Dick	1,416		
Liberal Democrats	David Lucas	411		
Liberal Democrats	Madeleine Jevon	353		
Liberal Democrats	Jean Callender	334		
Conservative	John Wraith	252		
BNP	Terence Jopling	246		
Conservative	Suzanna Crossman	222		
Conservative	Trevor Murray	218		
Turnout		6,512	42.2	

High Fell (3)
Party	Candidate	Votes	%	±%
Labour	Jean Lee	1,455		
Labour	Malcolm Graham	1,401		
Labour	Brian Richmond	1,363		
Liberal Democrats	Elizabeth Bird	548		
Liberal Democrats	Shakuntala Beadle	444		
Liberal Democrats	Philip Allen	413		
BNP	Ronald Fairlamb	311		
Conservative	Shirley McNall	279		
Conservative	Edward Parker	221		
Conservative	Elizabeth Parker	204		
Turnout		6,639	40.4	

Lamesley (3)
Party	Candidate	Votes	%	±%
Labour	Joseph Hattam	1,507		
Labour	Nicholas O'Neil	1,491		
Labour	Craig Harrison	1,461		
Liberal	Robert Murphy	731		
Liberal	Edwina Leedale	726		
Liberal	Brian Bailey	719		
Independent	Brian Weatherburn	651		
BNP	Allan Burns	352		
Conservative	Charles Sludden	302		
Conservative	Alfred Sterling	238		
Conservative	Audrey Sterling	214		
Turnout		8,392	48.7	

Lobley Hill and Bensham (3)
Party	Candidate	Votes	%	±%
Labour	Catherine Donovan	1,520		
Labour	Francis Donovan	1,468		
Labour	Kevin Dodds	1,465		
Liberal Democrats	Alexander Simpson	641		
Liberal Democrats	Audrey Horton	566		
Liberal Democrats	Phyllis Callender	539		
BNP	George Bainbridge	397		
Conservative	Ada Callanan	379		
Conservative	Josaph Sharp	341		
Conservative	Alan Newton	305		
Turnout		7,621	41.6	

Low Fell (3)
Party	Candidate	Votes	%	±%
Liberal Democrats	Frank Hindle	2,279		
Liberal Democrats	Ronald Beadle	2,198		
Liberal Democrats	Charles Jevon	2,173		
Labour	Peter Gannon	961		
Labour	Paul McNally	884		
Labour	Peter Wilson	870		
Conservative	Raymond Swadling	567		
Conservative	Cheryle Walker	558		
Conservative	Paul Sterling	524		
Turnout		11,014	56.0	

Pelaw and Heworth (3)
Party	Candidate	Votes	%	±%
Liberal Democrats	Ian Patterson	1,725		
Liberal Democrats	Doreen Boyes	1,561		
Liberal Democrats	Robinson Stanaway	1,526		
Labour	Robert Goldsworthy	1,296		
Labour	Lee Daniels	1,198		
Labour	Noor Mian	1,081		
BNP	Terence Armstrong	240		
Conservative	Alice Irving	169		
Conservative	Eleanor Justice	164		
Conservative	Eleanor Steeley	125		
Turnout		9,085	51.7	

Ryton, Cookhill and Stella (3)
Party	Candidate	Votes	%	±%
Liberal Democrats	Ione Rippeth	2,166		
Liberal Democrats	Norman Callender	1,863		
Liberal Democrats	Christine McHatton	1,845		
Labour	Valerie Murray	960		
Labour	Dane Roberts	883		
Labour	Brenda Graham	806		
BNP	Diane Young	186		
Conservative	Antoinette Sterling	164		
Conservative	Karl Gatiss	154		
Conservative	Andrea Gatiss	148		
Turnout		9,175	53.8	

Saltwell (3)
Party	Candidate	Votes	%	±%
Labour	Ian Mearns	1,554		
Labour	Michael Henry	1,525		
Labour	Joseph Mitchinson	1,458		
Liberal Democrats	Paul Cowie	507		
Liberal Democrats	Herbert Anderson	423		
Liberal Democrats	Walter Danys	393		
Conservative	Lily Pearse	332		
Conservative	Edward Bohill	322		
BNP	Keith McFarlane	240		
Conservative	Brett Stephenson	239		
Turnout		6,993	40.3	

Wardley and Leam Lane (3)
Party	Candidate	Votes	%	±%
Labour	Linda Green	1,602		
Labour	John Green	1,558		
Labour	Peter Mole	1,454		
Liberal Democrats	Susan Walker	596		
Liberal Democrats	John Diston	565		
Liberal Democrats	Celia Wraith	548		
BNP	Brian Lindsay	315		
Conservative	John McNeil	280		
Conservative	Mary Peart	268		
Conservative	Thomas Peart	229		
Turnout		7,415	45.6	

Whickham North (3)
Party	Candidate	Votes	%	±%
Liberal Democrats	Mary Wallace	1,819		
Liberal Democrats	Christopher Ord	1,803		
Liberal Democrats	Peter Craig	1,743		
Labour	Thomas Herring	1,196		
Labour	James Hewson	1,157		
Labour	Jennifer Peace	1,135		
Conservative	Elaine Robertson	339		
Conservative	John Robertson	323		
Conservative	Beryl Bennison	300		
Turnout		9,815	53.7	

Whickham South and Sunniside (3)
Party	Candidate	Votes	%	±%
Liberal Democrats	Alan Ord	2,240		
Liberal Democrats	Jonathan Wallace	2,238		
Liberal Democrats	Marilynn Ord	2,208		
Labour	Gary Haley	949		
Labour	Peter De-Vere	896		
Labour	Patricia Todd	894		
Conservative	Sheila Everatt	508		
Conservative	Peter Ross	437		
Conservative	Eric Young	398		
Turnout		10,768	54.0	

Windy Nook and Whitehills (3)
Party	Candidate	Votes	%	±%
Labour	Patricia Ronan	1,939		
Labour	James Turnbull	1,925		
Labour	Thomas Graham	1,888		
Liberal Democrats	Helen Robson	675		
Liberal Democrats	Norman Spours	645		
Liberal Democrats	Amanda Smith	619		
BNP	Michael Cassidy	417		
Conservative	Malcolm Campbell	271		
Conservative	George Walker	246		
Conservative	Ann Wheatley	243		
Turnout		8,868	45.5	

Winlaton and High Spen (3)
Party	Candidate	Votes	%	±%
Labour	David Lynn	1,667		
Liberal Democrats	Brenda Osborne	1,632		
Labour	Julie Simpson	1,517		
Labour	Lynn Caffrey	1,515		
Liberal Democrats	Andrew Graham	1,465		
Liberal Democrats	Joanne Smith	1,422		
BNP	Joanne Paylor	291		
Conservative	Alan Bond	230		
Conservative	Valerie Bond	215		
Conservative	Dawn Wraith	192		
Turnout		10,146	54.9	

Preceded by 2003 Gateshead Council election	Gateshead local elections	Succeeded by 2006 Gateshead Council election
