= 1998 Gateshead Metropolitan Borough Council election =

1998 UK local government election

Elections to Gateshead Council in Tyne and Wear, England were held on 7 May 1998. One third of the council was up for election and the Labour Party kept overall control of the council.

After the election, the composition of the council was:

- Labour 51
- Liberal Democrat 15

== Election result ==
Gateshead local election result 1998
Party	Seats	Gains	Losses	Net gain/loss	Seats %	Votes %	Votes	+/−
Labour	18			0	78.3			
Liberal Democrats	5			0	21.7			

Preceded by 1996 Gateshead Council election	Gateshead local elections	Succeeded by 1999 Gateshead Council election
