= 2011 Gateshead Metropolitan Borough Council election =

2011 UK local government election

Results of the 2011 Gateshead Metropolitan Borough Council election

The 2011 Gateshead Metropolitan Borough Council election took place on 5 May 2011 to elect members of Gateshead Metropolitan Borough Council in Tyne and Wear, England, as part of the wider 2011 United Kingdom local elections.

== Ward results ==
Birtley
Party	Candidate	Votes	%
Labour	Neil Weatherly (incumbent)	1,629	66.3
Liberal	Betty Gallon	563	22.9
Conservative	Andrea Gatiss	264	10.7
Majority		1066	43.4
Turnout		2,456	
Labour hold			

Blaydon
Party	Candidate	Votes	%
Labour	Kathryn Ferdinand (incumbent)	2,029	75.1
Liberal Democrats	Kelly Todd	384	14.2
Conservative	Mark Anthony Watson	287	10.6
Majority			
Turnout			
Labour hold			

Bridges
Party	Candidate	Votes	%
Labour	Bob Goldsworthy	1,353	70.8
Liberal Democrats	Dave Fawcett	293	15.3
Conservative	John Gardiner	266	13.9
Majority			
Turnout			
Labour hold			

Chopwell and Rowlands Gill
Party	Candidate	Votes	%
Labour	Michael McNestry (incumbent)	2,384	71.5
Liberal Democrats	Raymond Callender	554	16.6
Conservative	Karl Gatiss	396	11.9
Majority			
Turnout			
Labour hold			

Chowdene
Party	Candidate	Votes	%
Labour	Keith Wood(incumbent)	2,236	72.2
Conservative	John Callanan	580	18.7
Liberal Democrats	Edna Graham	280	9.0
Majority			
Turnout			
Labour hold			

Lamesley
Party	Candidate	Votes	%
Labour	Mary Kelly Foy	1,217	50.0
Liberal	Andrew Colin Dixon	567	23.3
Independent	Brian Weatherburn	454	18.6
Conservative	Sheila Everatt	197	8.1
Majority		650	26.7%
Turnout		2,435	36.9%
Labour hold			

Lobley Hill and Bensham
Party	Candidate	Votes	%
Labour	Kevin Michael Dodds (incumbent)	996	39.4
Liberal Democrats	Susan Craig	904	35.7
BNP	George Bainbridge	272	10.8
Independent	Margaret Duddin	181	7.2
Conservative	Hazel Sarah Anderson	176	7.0
Majority		92	3.6%
Turnout		2,529	35.6%
Labour hold			

Low Fell
Party	Candidate	Votes	%
Liberal Democrats	Charles Jevon (incumbent)	1,867	61.7
Labour	Joseph William Lisle	730	24.1
Conservative	Paul Sterling	433	14.3
Majority		1,137	37.5%
Turnout		3,030	43.5%
Liberal Democrats hold			

Pelaw and Heworth
Party	Candidate	Votes	%
Liberal Democrats	Robinson Geoffrey Stanaway (incumbent)	1,467	59.4
Labour	Jim McWilliams	870	35.2
Conservative	Maureen Moor	133	5.4
Majority		597	24.2%
Turnout		2,470	38.0%
Liberal Democrats hold			

Ryton, Crookhill and Stella
Party	Candidate	Votes	%
Liberal Democrats	Christine Margaret McHatton (incumbent)	1,714	64.5
Labour	Brenda Clelland	763	28.7
Conservative	Antoinette Margaret Sterling	179	6.7
Majority		951	35.8%
Turnout		2,656	42.6%
Liberal Democrats hold			

Saltwell
Party	Candidate	Votes	%
Labour	Joseph Mitchinson (incumbent)	1,089	55.8
Liberal Democrats	Norman Spours	342	17.5
Conservative	Edward Bohill	207	10.6
BNP	Kenneth Hutton	168	8.6
Independent	Joanne McLeod Smailes	146	7.5
Majority		747	38.3%
Turnout		1,952	31.5%
Labour hold			

Wardley and Leam Lane
Party	Candidate	Votes	%
Labour	Peter James Mole (incumbent)	1,248	56.2
Liberal Democrats	John Paul Diston	713	32.1
Conservative	Karl Gatiss	258	11.6
Majority		535	24.1%
Turnout		2,219	35.7%
Labour hold			

Whickham North
Party	Candidate	Votes	%
Liberal Democrats	Peter Thomas Craig (incumbent)	1,647	62.1
Labour	Jennifer Anne Peace	788	29.7
Conservative	Elaine Robertson	218	8.2
Majority		859	32.4%
Turnout		2,653	40.6%
Liberal Democrats hold			

Whickham South and Sunniside
Party	Candidate	Votes	%
Liberal Democrats	Marilynn Ord (incumbent)	1,928	66.3
Labour	Peter De-Vere	618	21.2
Conservative	John Robertson	364	12.5
Majority		1,310	45.0%
Turnout		2,910	42.4%
Liberal Democrats hold			

Windy Nook and Whitehills
Party	Candidate	Votes	%
Labour	Thomas Graham (incumbent)	1,430	58.7
Liberal Democrats	Susan Walker	501	20.5
BNP	Michael Cassidy	331	13.4
Conservative	Eric Young	176	7.2
Majority		929	38.1%
Turnout		2,438	32.0%
Labour hold			

Winlaton and High Spen
Party	Candidate	Votes	%
Liberal Democrats	Andrew Graham	1,687	53.3
Labour	Julie Simpson (incumbent)	1,292	40.8
Conservative	Thomas Edward Button	186	5.9
Majority		395	12.5%
Turnout		3,165	45.9%
Liberal Democrats gain from Labour			

Preceded by 2010 Gateshead Council election	Gateshead local elections	Succeeded by 2012 Gateshead Council election
