= 2002 Gateshead Metropolitan Borough Council election =

2002 UK local government election

Elections to Gateshead Council in Tyne and Wear, England were held on 2 May 2002. One third of the council was up for election and the Labour Party kept overall control of the council.

The election took place with all postal voting in an attempt to increase voter turnout. This followed a successful trial in two wards in the previous election in 2000. As a result of the trial turnout rose from 30% to 57.4%, which was higher than Gateshead saw in the 2001 general election.

Only one seat changed hands in the election, with the Liberal Democrats making one gain from Labour.

After the election, the composition of the council was:

- Labour 46
- Liberal Democrat 19
- Liberal 1

== Election result ==
Gateshead local election result 2002
Party	Seats	Gains	Losses	Net gain/loss	Seats %	Votes %	Votes	+/−
Labour	16	0	1	-1	72.7	56.9	49,121	
Liberal Democrats	6	1	0	+1	27.3	28.7	24,792	
Conservative	0	0	0	0	0	8.7	7,535	
Liberal	0	0	0	0	0	3.1	2,697	
BNP	0	0	0	0	0	1.0	865	
Green	0	0	0	0	0	0.9	755	
Independent	0	0	0	0	0	0.6	552	
Socialist Alliance	0	0	0	0	0	0.1	79	

== Ward results ==
Bede
Party	Candidate	Votes	%	±%
Labour	John Eagle	1,872	76.3	
Liberal Democrats	Andrew Bex	398	16.2	
Conservative	Ruth Fearby	182	7.4	
Majority		1,474	60.1	
Turnout		2,452		

Bensham
Party	Candidate	Votes	%	±%
Labour	Catherine Donovan	1,885	70.8	
Liberal Democrats	Susan Armstrong	262	9.8	
Conservative	Ada Callanan	252	9.5	
BNP	Kevin Scott	185	6.9	
Socialist Alliance	David Morton	79	3.0	
Majority		1,623	61.0	
Turnout		2,663		

Birtley
Party	Candidate	Votes	%	±%
Labour	Neil Weatherley	1,965	53.2	
Liberal	Mark Davidson	1,508	40.8	
Conservative	Barbara Nye	221	6.0	
Majority		457	12.4	
Turnout		3,694		

Blaydon
Party	Candidate	Votes	%	±%
Labour	Malcolm Brain	2,243	64.5	
Liberal Democrats	June McFarling	962	27.7	
Conservative	Mark Watson	272	7.8	
Majority		1,281	36.8	
Turnout		3,477		

Chopwell and Rowlands Gill
Party	Candidate	Votes	%	±%
Labour	Henry Bulmer	2,645	57.7	
Liberal Democrats	Eileen Blythe	1,285	28.0	
Conservative	David Moor	336	7.3	
Green	Pamela Woolner	317	6.9	
Majority		1,360	29.7	
Turnout		4,583		

Chowdene
Party	Candidate	Votes	%	±%
Labour	Gordon Spring	2,821	69.1	
Conservative	Raymond Swadling	670	16.4	
Liberal Democrats	Glenys Goodwill	590	14.5	
Majority		2,151	52.7	
Turnout		4,081		

Crawcrook and Greenside
Party	Candidate	Votes	%	±%
Liberal Democrats	Derek Anderson	2,369	52.2	
Labour	Jack Graham	1,933	42.6	
Conservative	Leonard Davidson	238	5.2	
Majority		436	9.6	
Turnout		4,540		

Deckham
Party	Candidate	Votes	%	±%
Labour	June Joyce	1,969	68.1	
Liberal Democrats	George Conder	480	16.6	
Conservative	Karen Sludden	443	15.3	
Majority		1,489	51.5	
Turnout		2,892		

Dunston
Party	Candidate	Votes	%	±%
Labour	David Bollands	2,932	68.7	
Liberal Democrats	Mary Heslop	458	10.7	
Green	Isabel Blanchflower	438	10.3	
Conservative	John Callanan	437	10.2	
Majority		2,474	58.0	
Turnout		4,265		

Felling
Party	Candidate	Votes	%	±%
Labour	William Dick	2,349	77.7	
Conservative	Trevor Murray	344	11.4	
Liberal Democrats	Ian Ball	331	10.9	
Majority		2,005	66.3	
Turnout		3,024		

High Fell
Party	Candidate	Votes	%	±%
Labour	William Batty	2,313	69.3	
Independent	William Maddison	552	16.5	
Liberal Democrats	Elizabeth Bird	279	8.4	
Conservative	June Murray	193	5.8	
Majority		1,761	52.8	
Turnout		3,337		

Lamesley
Party	Candidate	Votes	%	±%
Labour	Nicholas O'Neil	2,105	58.9	
Liberal	Catherine Rainbow	1,189	33.3	
Conservative	Charles Sludden	281	7.9	
Majority		916	25.6	
Turnout		3,575		

Leam
Party	Candidate	Votes	%	±%
Labour	Patricia Ronan	2,956	73.9	
Liberal Democrats	Norman Spours	683	17.1	
Conservative	Maureen Moor	359	9.0	
Majority		2,273	56.8	
Turnout		3,998		

Low Fell
Party	Candidate	Votes	%	±%
Liberal Democrats	Charles Jevon	2,734	57.8	
Labour	Peter Wilson	1,410	29.8	
Conservative	Paul Sterling	586	12.4	
Majority		1,324	28.0	
Turnout		4,730		

Pelaw and Heworth
Party	Candidate	Votes	%	±%
Liberal Democrats	Doreen Boyes	1,986	48.8	
Labour	Roberts Goldsworthy	1,910	47.0	
Conservative	Elaine McMaster	171	4.2	
Majority		76	1.8	
Turnout		4,067		

Ryton
Party	Candidate	Votes	%	±%
Liberal Democrats	Christine McHatton	2,945	61.6	
Labour	Dane Roberts	1,590	33.2	
Conservative	Antoinette Sterling	247	5.2	
Majority		1,355	28.4	
Turnout		4,782		

Saltwell
Party	Candidate	Votes	%	±%
Labour	Michael Henry	2,076	65.3	
Liberal Democrats	Herbert Anderson	400	12.6	
Conservative	Mark Hardy	355	11.2	
BNP	George Bainbridge	349	11.0	
Majority		1,676	52.7	
Turnout		3,180		

Teams
Party	Candidate	Votes	%	±%
Labour	Patrick Rice	2,580	67.3	
Liberal Democrats	James Blythe	522	13.6	
Conservative	Margaret Bell	403	10.5	
BNP	Michael Dafter	331	8.6	
Majority		2,058	53.7	
Turnout		3,836		

Whickham North
Party	Candidate	Votes	%	±%
Liberal Democrats	Peter Maughan	2,472	48.8	
Labour	Frank Earl	2,201	43.4	
Conservative	Elaine Robertson	393	7.8	
Majority		271	5.4	
Turnout		5,066		

Whickham South
Party	Candidate	Votes	%	±%
Liberal Democrats	Marilyn Ord	3,164	58.5	
Labour	Gary Haley	1,667	30.8	
Conservative	Peter Ross	576	10.7	
Majority		1,494	27.7	
Turnout		5,407		

Winlaton
Party	Candidate	Votes	%	±%
Labour	David Lynn	2,282	53.8	
Liberal Democrats	Peter Stokel	1,782	42.0	
Conservative	Ann Bohill	178	4.2	
Majority		500	11.8	
Turnout		4,242		

Wrekendyke
Party	Candidate	Votes	%	±%
Labour	John Green	3,417	75.8	
Liberal Democrats	John Diston	690	15.3	
Conservative	John McNeil	398	8.8	
Majority		2,727	60.5	
Turnout		4,505		

Preceded by 2000 Gateshead Council election	Gateshead local elections	Succeeded by 2003 Gateshead Council election
