= 1999 Gateshead Metropolitan Borough Council election =

1999 UK local government election

Elections to Gateshead Council in Tyne and Wear, England were held on 6 May 1999. One third of the council was up for election and the Labour Party kept overall control of the council. The results saw the Liberal Democrats gain 2 seats from Labour but Labour gained one seat in Blaydon. Overall turnout was 26.4%.

After the election, the composition of the council was:

- Labour 49
- Liberal Democrat 15
- Liberal 1
- Other 1

== Election result ==
Gateshead local election result 1999
Party	Seats	Gains	Losses	Net gain/loss	Seats %	Votes %	Votes	+/−
Labour	16	1	2	-1	72.7	56.8		
Liberal Democrats	6			+1	27.3	36.3		
Conservative	0	0	0	0	0	5.4		
Others	0	0	0	0	0	1.3		

Preceded by 1998 Gateshead Council election	Gateshead local elections	Succeeded by 2000 Gateshead Council election
