= 2006 Gateshead Metropolitan Borough Council election =

2006 UK local government election

← 2004	4 May 2006	2007 →

22 of the 66 seats on Gateshead Metropolitan Borough Council 34 seats needed for a majority
	First party	Second party
Party	Labour	Liberal Democrats
Seats won	14	8
Seats after	42	23
Seat change	▼1	▲1
Popular vote	23,678	19,925
Percentage	44.6%	37.5%
Swing	▼0.4%	▲4.8%
- A map of the 2006 Gateshead Council election. Labour in red and Liberal Democrats in orange.
Council control before election
Labour
Council control after election
Labour

The 2006 Gateshead Council election was held on Thursday 4 May 2006 to elect members of Gateshead Metropolitan Borough Council, in England. It was held on the same day as other English local elections. One third of the council was up for election, with the poll coming two years after boundary changes in the previous election which had necessitated the whole council facing voters at once. The Labour Party retained control, and a Liberal Democrat gain from Labour in Winlaton and High Spen was the only change in the level of party representation on the council. Turnout was 37.0%, lower than the 47.7% achieved in 2004. In total, 79 candidates stood for election, with the Labour and Conservative parties standing for all of the seats. The Liberal Democrats stood in all but two wards where the Liberal Party stood instead. There were also eight British National Party candidates, one UK Independence Party candidate and four independents.

== Overall result ==
Gateshead Metropolitan Borough Council election, 2006
Party	Seats	Gains	Losses	Net gain/loss	Seats %	Votes %	Votes	+/−
Labour	14	0	1	▼1	63.6	44.6	23,678	▼0.4
Liberal Democrats	8	1	0	▲1	34.8	37.5	19,925	▲4.8
Conservative	0	0	0	Steady	0.0	9.6	5,083	▼0.6
Liberal	0	0	0	Steady	1.5	2.8	1,483	▼0.7
BNP	0	0	0	Steady	0.0	3.7	1,941	▼4.0
Independent	0	0	0	Steady	0.0	1.7	885	▲0.8
UKIP	0	0	0	Steady	0.0	0.3	143	New

== Ward results ==
Birtley
Party	Candidate	Votes	%
Labour	Paul Foy (incumbent)	1,161	51.5
Liberal	Betty Gallon	916	40.6
Conservative	Andrea Gatiss	179	7.9
Majority		245	10.9%
Turnout		2,256	35.8%
Labour hold			

Blaydon
Party	Candidate	Votes	%
Labour	Kathryn Ferdinand (incumbent)	1,175	56.1
Liberal Democrats	Mark Gardner	726	34.7
Conservative	Mark Anthony Watson	194	9.3
Majority		449	21.4%
Turnout		2,095	31.4%
Labour hold			

Bridges
Party	Candidate	Votes	%
Labour	Angela Armstrong	858	54.3
Liberal Democrats	Philip Stanley Allen	323	20.5
BNP	Kevin Robert Bell	219	13.9
Conservative	Adrian Anderson	179	11.3
Majority		535	33.9%
Turnout		1,579	30.9%
Labour hold			

Chopwell and Rowlands Gill
Party	Candidate	Votes	%
Labour	Maureen Chaplin (incumbent)	1,738	58.5
Liberal Democrats	Raymond Callender	995	33.5
Conservative	Allan Davidson	236	7.9
Majority		743	25.0%
Turnout		2,969	41.8%
Labour hold			

Chowdene
Party	Candidate	Votes	%
Labour	Maureen Goldsworthy (incumbent)	1,357	51.0
Liberal Democrats	Glenys Marie Goodwill	720	27.1
Conservative	Michael Anthony Crossman	579	21.8
Majority		637	24.0%
Turnout		2,656	37.5%
Labour hold			

Crawcrook and Greenside
Party	Candidate	Votes	%
Liberal Democrats	Sally Elizabeth Danys (incumbent)	1,463	53.8
Labour	Helen Elizabeth Hughes	1,049	38.6
Conservative	Leonard Davidson	207	7.6
Majority		414	15.2%
Turnout		2,719	41.2%
Liberal Democrats hold			

Deckham
Party	Candidate	Votes	%
Labour	Martin Gannon (incumbent)	1,014	49.9
Liberal Democrats	Gareth Michael Mariner Johnson	453	22.3
BNP	Kevin Scott	332	16.3
Conservative	Trevor Charles Murray	232	11.4
Majority		561	27.6%
Turnout		2,031	30.9%
Labour hold			

Dunston and Teams
Party	Candidate	Votes	%
Labour	Patrick John Rice (incumbent)	984	54.3
Liberal Democrats	Elizabeth Robson	321	17.7
BNP	Terrence Jopling	242	13.3
Conservative	Ada Callanan	162	8.9
Independent	Robert David Latham	104	5.7
Majority		663	36.6%
Turnout		1,813	30.3%
Labour hold			

Dunston Hill and Whickham East
Party	Candidate	Votes	%
Liberal Democrats	Allison Elizabeth Ilderton Chatto (incumbent)	1,535	51.2
Labour	Gary Robert Haley	1,203	40.1
Conservative	John Callanan	262	8.7
Majority		332	11.1%
Turnout		3,000	44.2%
Liberal Democrats hold			

Felling
Party	Candidate	Votes	%
Labour	William Dick (incumbent)	1,067	61.6
Liberal Democrats	David Paul Lucas	319	18.4
BNP	Keith Edward McFarlane	203	11.7
Conservative	John Steven Wraith	144	8.3
Majority		748	43.1%
Turnout		1,733	30.4%
Labour hold			

High Fell
Party	Candidate	Votes	%
Labour	Brian Richmond (incumbent)	1,031	56.3
Liberal Democrats	Ann McCarthy	300	16.4
Conservative	June Murray	182	9.9
BNP	Ronald William Fairlamb	174	9.5
UKIP	William James Edward Batty	143	7.8
Majority		731	39.9%
Turnout		1,830	29.3%
Rejected ballots		4	
Labour hold			

Lamesley
Party	Candidate	Votes	%
Labour	Mary Foy (politician)	1,217	50.0
Liberal	Andrew Colin Dixon	567	23.3
Independent	Brian Weatherburn	454	18.6
Conservative	Sheila Everatt	197	8.1
Majority		650	26.7%
Turnout		2,435	36.9%
Labour hold			

Lobley Hill and Bensham
Party	Candidate	Votes	%
Labour	Kevin Michael Dodds (incumbent)	996	39.4
Liberal Democrats	Susan Craig	904	35.7
BNP	George Bainbridge	272	10.8
Independent	Margaret Duddin	181	7.2
Conservative	Hazel Sarah Anderson	176	7.0
Majority		92	3.6%
Turnout		2,529	35.6%
Labour hold			

Low Fell
Party	Candidate	Votes	%
Liberal Democrats	Charles Jevon (incumbent)	1,867	61.7
Labour	Joseph William Lisle	730	24.1
Conservative	Paul Sterling	433	14.3
Majority		1,137	37.5%
Turnout		3,030	43.5%
Liberal Democrats hold			

Pelaw and Heworth
Party	Candidate	Votes	%
Liberal Democrats	Robinson Geoffrey Stanaway (incumbent)	1,467	59.4
Labour	Jim McWilliams	870	35.2
Conservative	Maureen Moor	133	5.4
Majority		597	24.2%
Turnout		2,470	38.0%
Liberal Democrats hold			

Ryton, Crookhill and Stella
Party	Candidate	Votes	%
Liberal Democrats	Christine Margaret McHatton (incumbent)	1,714	64.5
Labour	Brenda Clelland	763	28.7
Conservative	Antoinette Margaret Sterling	179	6.7
Majority		951	35.8%
Turnout		2,656	42.6%
Liberal Democrats hold			

Saltwell
Party	Candidate	Votes	%
Labour	Joseph Mitchinson (incumbent)	1,089	55.8
Liberal Democrats	Norman Spours	342	17.5
Conservative	Edward Bohill	207	10.6
BNP	Kenneth Hutton	168	8.6
Independent	Joanne McLeod Smailes	146	7.5
Majority		747	38.3%
Turnout		1,952	31.5%
Labour hold			

Wardley and Leam Lane
Party	Candidate	Votes	%
Labour	Peter James Mole (incumbent)	1,248	56.2
Liberal Democrats	John Paul Diston	713	32.1
Conservative	Karl Gatiss	258	11.6
Majority		535	24.1%
Turnout		2,219	35.7%
Labour hold			

Whickham North
Party	Candidate	Votes	%
Liberal Democrats	Peter Thomas Craig (incumbent)	1,647	62.1
Labour	Jennifer Anne Peace	788	29.7
Conservative	Elaine Robertson	218	8.2
Majority		859	32.4%
Turnout		2,653	40.6%
Liberal Democrats hold			

Whickham South and Sunniside
Party	Candidate	Votes	%
Liberal Democrats	Marilynn Ord (incumbent)	1,928	66.3
Labour	Peter De-Vere	618	21.2
Conservative	John Robertson	364	12.5
Majority		1,310	45.0%
Turnout		2,910	42.4%
Liberal Democrats hold			

Windy Nook and Whitehills
Party	Candidate	Votes	%
Labour	Thomas Graham (incumbent)	1,430	58.7
Liberal Democrats	Susan Walker	501	20.5
BNP	Michael Cassidy	331	13.4
Conservative	Eric Young	176	7.2
Majority		929	38.1%
Turnout		2,438	32.0%
Labour hold			

Winlaton and High Spen
Party	Candidate	Votes	%
Liberal Democrats	Andrew Graham	1,687	53.3
Labour	Julie Simpson (incumbent)	1,292	40.8
Conservative	Thomas Edward Button	186	5.9
Majority		395	12.5%
Turnout		3,165	45.9%
Liberal Democrats gain from Labour			

Preceded by 2004 Gateshead Council election	Gateshead local elections	Succeeded by 2007 Gateshead Council election
