= 2000 Gateshead Metropolitan Borough Council election =

2000 UK local government election

Elections to Gateshead Council in Tyne and Wear, England were held on 4 May 2000. One third of the council was up for election and the Labour Party kept overall control of the council.

As part of an experiment to try to raise turnout, Bensham and Whickham North wards saw postal voting allowed for all voters. Turnout in Bensham ward rose from 20% in 1999 to 46% in this election, while Whickham North saw a turnout of 61%.

After the election, the composition of the council was:

- Labour 47
- Liberal Democrat 18
- Liberal 1

== Election result ==
Gateshead local election result 2000
Party	Seats	Gains	Losses	Net gain/loss	Seats %	Votes %	Votes	+/−
Labour	14			-2	63.6			
Liberal Democrats	7			+2	31.8			
Liberal	1			0	4.5			

Preceded by 1999 Gateshead Council election	Gateshead local elections	Succeeded by 2002 Gateshead Council election
