= 2012 Gateshead Metropolitan Borough Council election =

2012 UK local government election

Results of the 2012 Gateshead Metropolitan Borough Council election

The 2012 Gateshead Council election took place on 3 May 2012 to elect members of Gateshead Metropolitan Borough Council in Tyne & Wear, England. This was on the same day as other 2012 United Kingdom local elections.

== Resulting Council Composition ==
Party	Seats			Council Composition 3 May 2012
Party	2010	2011	2012	Council Composition 3 May 2012
Labour	45	50	55	
Liberal Democrats	20	15	11	

== Ward results ==
Spoilt votes are not included below.

=== Birtley ward ===
Birtley
Party	Candidate	Votes	%	±%
Labour	Catherine Simcox	1,394	62.2	+19.1
Liberal	Kathy King	716	32.0	−13.2
Conservative	Andrea Gatiss	130	5.8	−5.9
Majority		678	30.3	
Turnout		2,240		
Labour gain from Liberal		Swing		

=== Blaydon ward ===
Blaydon
Party	Candidate	Votes	%	±%
Labour	Steve Ronchetti	1,747	80.9	+29.4
Liberal Democrats	Kevin McClurey	232	10.7	−26.2
Conservative	Edward Ainscow	180	8.3	−3.3
Majority		1,515	70.2	
Turnout		2,159		
Labour hold		Swing		

=== Bridges ward ===
Bridges
Party	Candidate	Votes	%	±%
Labour	John Eagle	1,112	77.4	+25.3
Liberal Democrats	Dave Fawcett	176	12.3	−7.4
Conservative	John Gardiner	148	10.3	−4.1
Majority		936	65.2	
Turnout		1,436		
Labour hold		Swing		

=== Chopwell & Rowlands Gill ward ===
Chopwell & Rowlands Gill
Party	Candidate	Votes	%	±%
Labour	John Hamilton	2,126	80.8	+23.7
Liberal Democrats	Brenda Osborne	257	9.8	−16.8
Conservative	Karl Gatiss	249	9.5	−6.9
Majority		1,869	71.0	
Turnout		2,632		
Labour hold		Swing		

=== Chowdene ward ===
Chowdene
Party	Candidate	Votes	%	±%
Labour	John McElroy	2,009	77.7	+26.1
Conservative	Eric Young	350	13.5	−8.3
Liberal Democrats	Edna Graham	228	8.8	−4.2
Majority		1,659	64.1	
Turnout		2,587		
Labour hold		Swing		

=== Crawcrook & Greenside ward ===
Crawcrook & Greenside
Party	Candidate	Votes	%	±%
Labour	Kathleen McCartney	1,002	53.8	+17.6
Liberal Democrats	Christine Squires	706	37.9	−15.8
Conservative	Margaret Sterling	155	8.3	−5.6
Majority		296	15.9	
Turnout		1,863		
Labour gain from Liberal Democrats		Swing		

=== Deckham ward ===
Deckham
Party	Candidate	Votes	%	±%
Labour	Brian Coates	1,407	70.0	+21.7
Conservative	May Ainscow	214	10.7	−5.7
Liberal Democrats	Karen Crozier	146	7.3	−14.1
National Front	John Richards	124	6.2	N/A
TUSC	Normal Hall	118	5.9	N/A
Majority		1,193	59.4	
Turnout		2,009		
Labour hold		Swing		

=== Dunston & Teams ward ===
Dunston & Teams
Party	Candidate	Votes	%	±%
Labour	Brenda Clelland	1,436	83.8	+30.3
Conservative	Christopher MacAllister	165	9.6	−3.8
Liberal Democrats	Simon Todd	113	6.6	−10.4
Majority		1,271	74.2	
Turnout		1,714		
Labour hold		Swing		

=== Dunston Hill & Whickham East ward ===
Dunston Hill & Whickham East
Party	Candidate	Votes	%	±%
Liberal Democrats	Peter Maughan	1,423	49.2	−0.5
Labour	Chris McHugh	1,191	41.2	+12.6
Green	Mary Blanchflower	157	5.4	N/A
Conservative	John Callanan	122	4.2	−8.2
Majority		232	8.0	
Turnout		2,893		
Liberal Democrats hold		Swing		

=== Felling ward ===
Felling
Party	Candidate	Votes	%	±%
Labour	Sonya Dickie	1,501	85.8	+24.6
Conservative	Trevor Murray	136	7.8	−4.1
Liberal Democrats	Ian Gill	113	6.5	−9.1
Majority		1,365	78	
Turnout		1,750		
Labour hold		Swing		

=== High Fell ward ===
High Fell
Party	Candidate	Votes	%	±%
Labour	Jean Lee	1,393	75.1	+20.5
TUSC	Elaine Brunskill	248	13.4	N/A
Conservative	Edward Bohill	109	5.9	−6.5
Liberal Democrats	Norman Spours	106	5.7	
Majority		1,145	61.7	−9.4
Turnout		1,856		
Labour hold		Swing		

=== Lamesley ward ===
Lamesley
Party	Candidate	Votes	%	±%
Labour	Michael Hood	1,616	68.5	+19.6
Independent	Brian Weatherburn	311	13.2	−3.3
Liberal	Betty Gallon	261	11.1	−10.8
Conservative	Sheila Everatt	172	7.3	−5.5
Majority		1,305	55.3	
Turnout		2,360		
Labour hold		Swing		

=== Lobley Hill & Bensham ward ===
Lobley Hill & Bensham
Party	Candidate	Votes	%	±%
Labour	Catherine Donovan	1,636	74.3	+28.5
Green	Andy Redfern	237	10.8	N/A
Conservative	Valerie Bond	190	8.6	+2.3
Liberal Democrats	Philip Hunter	138	6.3	−33.2
Majority		1,399	63.5	
Turnout		2,201		
Labour hold		Swing		

=== Low Fell ward ===
Low Fell
Party	Candidate	Votes	%	±%
Liberal Democrats	Frank Hindle	1,441	47.9	−19.2
Labour	John Young	1,318	43.8	27.9
Conservative	Paul Sterling	251	8.3	−12.6
Majority		123	4.1	
Turnout		3,010		
Liberal Democrats hold		Swing		

=== Pelaw & Heworth ward ===
Pelaw & Heworth
Party	Candidate	Votes	%	±%
Labour	Lee Holmes	1,346	54.2	+24.8
Liberal Democrats	Ian Patterson	1,053	42.4	−10.1
Conservative	Maureen Moor	86	3.5	−2.0
Majority		293	11.8	
Turnout		2,485		
Labour gain from Liberal Democrats		Swing		

=== Ryton, Crookhill & Stella ward ===
Ryton, Crookhill & Stella
Party	Candidate	Votes	%	±%
Labour	Liz Twist	1,465	56.2	+30.2
Liberal Democrats	Maggie Milburn	941	36.1	−28.7
Conservative	Mark Watson	199	7.6	−1.5
Majority		524	20.1	
Turnout		2,605		
Labour gain from Liberal Democrats		Swing		

=== Saltwell ward ===
Saltwell
Party	Candidate	Votes	%	±%
Labour	Denise Robson	1,322	80.5	+18.2
Conservative	Alan Bond	195	11.9	−0.9
Liberal Democrats	Robinson Stanaway	126	7.7	−6.7
Majority		1,127	68.6	
Turnout		1,643		
Labour hold		Swing		

=== Wardley & Leam Lane ward ===
Wardley & Leam
Party	Candidate	Votes	%	±%
Labour	Linda Green	1,609	74.7	+21.6
Green	Stephen Watson	280	13.0	N/A
Conservative	Elizabeth Parker	161	7.5	−3.3
Liberal Democrats	John Diston	104	4.8	−17.0
Majority		1,329	61.7	
Turnout		2,154		
Labour hold		Swing		

=== Whickham North ward ===
Whickham North
Party	Candidate	Votes	%	±%
Liberal Democrats	Sonya Hawkins	1,282	48.7	−2.0
Labour	Elaine Dobson	1,188	45.1	+19.0
Conservative	Beryl Bennison	164	6.2	−6.3
Majority		94	3.6	
Turnout		2,634		
Liberal Democrats hold		Swing		

=== Whickham South & Sunniside ward ===
Whickham South & Sunniside
Party	Candidate	Votes	%	±%
Liberal Democrats	John McClurey	1,372	56.1	−12.1
Labour	Peter De-Vere	878	35.9	+22.4
Conservative	Edward Parker	197	8.1	−10.3
Majority		494	20.2	
Turnout		2,447		
Liberal Democrats hold		Swing		

=== Windy Nook & Whitehills ward ===
Windy Nook & Whitehills
Party	Candidate	Votes	%	±%
Labour	Pat Ronan	1,963	82.8	+26.3
Conservative	Kyle Murray	228	9.6	−1.5
Liberal Democrats	Lisa Bradley	179	7.6	−11.7
Majority		1,735	73.2	
Turnout		2,370		
Labour hold		Swing		

=== Winlaton & High Spen ward ===
Winlaton & High Spen
Party	Candidate	Votes	%	±%
Labour	Julie Simpson	1,948	73.4	+29.3
Liberal Democrats	Elaine Earl	486	18.3	−28.0
Conservative	Diana Moore	220	8.3	−1.3
Majority		1,462	55.1	
Turnout		2,654		
Labour gain from Liberal Democrats		Swing		
