= 2018 Gateshead Metropolitan Borough Council election =

2018 UK local government election

Map showing the results of the 2018 Gateshead Metropolitan Borough Council election

The 2018 Gateshead Metropolitan Borough Council election took place on 3 May 2018 to elect members of Gateshead Metropolitan Borough Council in England. This was on the same day as other local elections.

== Election breakdown by ward ==
=== Birtley ===
Birtley
Party	Candidate	Votes	%	±%
Labour	Paul Foy	1,162	59.3	▲3.7
Liberal Democrats	Paul Elliott	389	19.9	New
Conservative	Caroline Sterling	323	16.5	▲6.4
Green	Rachel Cabral	85	4.3	New
Majority		773	39.4	▲18
Turnout			31.5	
Labour hold		Swing	▼8.1	

=== Blaydon ===
Blaydon
Party	Candidate	Votes	%	±%
Labour	Kathryn Ferdinand	1,413	68.7	▲11.0
Conservative	Michael Leonard	349	17.0	▲7.9
Green	Alexander Ramin	146	7.1	New
Liberal Democrats	Stuart McClurey	116	5.6	▼0.1
Space Navies	Lisabela Marschild	33	1.6	New
Majority		1064	51.7	▼0.3
Turnout			28.5	
Labour hold		Swing	▲1.6	

=== Bridges ===
Bridges
Party	Candidate	Votes	%	±%
Labour	Angela Douglas	1,012	66.5	
Conservative	John Gardiner	276	18.1	
Liberal Democrats	David Lumsden	131	8.6	
Green	Ian Fraser	103	6.8	
Majority		736		
Turnout			25.8	

=== Chopwell and Rowlands Gill ===
Chopwell and Rowlands Gill
Party	Candidate	Votes	%	±%
Labour	Lynne Caffrey	1,073	67.5	
Conservative	Lucinda Wilson	415	16.5	
Green	David Castleton	233	9.2	
Liberal Democrats	Jean Callender	171	6.8	
Majority		1288		
Turnout		36.6		

=== Chowdene ===
Chowdene
Party	Candidate	Votes	%	±%
Labour	Maureen Goldsworthy	1,299	56.6	
Liberal Democrats	Dawn Welsh	380	16.5	
Conservative	Eric Young	376	16.4	
UKIP	John O'Carroll	112	4.9	
Green	Ryan Jones	97	4.2	
TUSC	Marika Smith	33	1.4	
Majority		919		
Turnout			32.9	

=== Crawcrook and Greenside ===
Crawcrook and Greenside
Party	Candidate	Votes	%	±%
Labour	Hugh Kelly	1,425	57.8	
Conservative	Leonard Davidson	510	20.7	
Green	Diane Cadman	282	11.4	
Liberal Democrats	Steven Hawkins	250	10.1	
Majority		915		
Turnout			36.5	

=== Deckham ===
Deckham
Party	Candidate	Votes	%	±%
Labour	Martin Gannon	1,229	64.6	
Conservative	May Ainscow	346	18.2	
Liberal Democrats	David Fawcett	131	6.9	
Green	Gary Brooks	125	6.6	
TUSC	Norman Hall	71	3.7	
Majority		883		
Turnout			28.9	

=== Dunston and Teams ===
Dunston and Teams
Party	Candidate	Votes	%	±%
Labour	Dot Burnett	1,176	69.6	
Conservative	Jordan-Lee Guthrie	259	15.3	
Green	Andy Blanchflower	160	9.5	
Liberal Democrats	Stacey Duggan	95	5.6	
Majority		917		
Turnout			26.4	

=== Dunston Hill and Whickham East ===
Dunston Hill and Whickham East
Party	Candidate	Votes	%	±%
Liberal Democrats	Kevin McClurey	1,543	52.6	
Labour	Allison Thompson	975	33.3	
Conservative	Jak Hocking	204	7.0	
Save Us Now	Graham Steele	122	4.2	
Green	Isabel Blanchflower	87	3.0	
Majority		568		
Turnout			43.6	

=== Felling ===
Felling
Party	Candidate	Votes	%	±%
Labour	Bill Dick	1,175	72.7	
Conservative	Peter Jackson	239	14.8	
Liberal Democrats	Gareth Cooper	203	12.6	
Majority		936		
Turnout			27.6	

=== High Fell ===
High Fell
Party	Candidate	Votes	%	±%
Labour	Judith Gibson	1,067	65.9	
Conservative	Edward Bohill	271	16.7	
TUSC	Sean Doherty	174	10.7	
Liberal Democrats	Lynda Duggan	107	6.6	
Majority		796		
Turnout			26.4	

=== Lamesley ===
Lamesley
Party	Candidate	Votes	%	±%
Labour	Mary Foy (politician)	1,400	63.9	
Conservative	Sheila Everatt	480	21.9	
Democrats and Veterans	Adrian Allen	171	7.8	
Liberal Democrats	Andrew Smith	140	6.4	
Majority		920		
Turnout			30	

=== Lobley Hill and Bensham ===
Lobley Hill and Bensham
Party	Candidate	Votes	%	±%
Labour	Kevin Dodds	1,251	62.1	
Conservative	Sam Khan	384	19.1	
Green	Andy Redfern	202	10.0	
Liberal Democrats	Leanne Brand	178	8.8	
Majority		867		
Turnout			28.1	

=== Low Fell ===
Low Fell
Party	Candidate	Votes	%	±%
Liberal Democrats	Susan Craig	1,615	50.5	
Labour	Mariam Dunlop	1,073	33.6	
Conservative	David Potts	341	10.7	
Green	Ruth Grant	134	4.2	
TUSC	Elaine Brunskill	32	1.0	
Majority		542		
Turnout			45.5	

=== Pelaw and Heworth ===
Pelaw and Heworth
Party	Candidate	Votes	%	±%
Labour	Rosy Oxberry	1,048	48.1	
Liberal Democrats	John Diston	946	43.4	
Conservative	Paul Sterling	185	8.4	
Majority		102		
Turnout			33.6	

=== Ryton Crookhill and Stella ===
Ryton Crookhill and Stella*
Party	Candidate	Votes	%	±%
Labour	Freda Geddes	1,425	46.8	
Labour	Christopher Buckley	1,291	42.4	
Liberal Democrats	Christine McHatton	1,263	41.5	
Liberal Democrats	Sandra McClurey	905	29.7	
Conservative	Janice Hutchinson	233	7.6	
UKIP	Alan Craig	194	6.4	
Conservative	Susan Wilson	183	6.0	
Green	Simon Easton	152	5.0	
TUSC	Ros Cooper	53	1.7	
Majority		162		
Turnout			43.5%	

*This ward is electing two councillors due to the vacancy left by Liz Twist when she became MP for Blaydon.

=== Saltwell ===
Saltwell
Party	Candidate	Votes	%	±%
Labour	John Adams	1,127	62.2	
Conservative	Alan Bond	375	20.7	
Liberal Democrats	Victoria Anderson	158	8.7	
Green	Jon Burns	107	5.9	
SDP	Darren Thompson	44	2.4	
Majority		752		
Turnout			29.6	

=== Wardley and Leam Lane ===
Wardley and Leam Lane
Party	Candidate	Votes	%	±%
Labour	Anne Wheeler	1,262	64.8	
Conservative	John McNeil	394	20.2	
Liberal Democrats	Susan Walker	177	9.1	
Green	Neil Grant	114	5.9	
Majority		868		
Turnout			31.7	

=== Whickham North ===
Whickham North
Party	Candidate	Votes	%	±%
Liberal Democrats	Peter Craig	1,543	60.1	
Labour	Laura Bennett	768	29.9	
Conservative	John Callanan	255	9.9	
Majority		775		
Turnout			40.5	

=== Whickham South and Sunniside ===
Whickham South and Sunniside
Party	Candidate	Votes	%	±%
Liberal Democrats	Marilynn Ord	1,970	66.7	
Labour	Robert Lee Waugh	656	22.2	
Conservative	Perry Wilson	326	11.0	
Majority		1314		
Turnout			45.7	

=== Windy Nook and Whitehills ===
Windy Nook and Whitehills
Party	Candidate	Votes	%	±%
Labour	Thomas Graham	1,486	71.3	
Conservative	Kyle Murray	408	19.6	
Liberal Democrats	Karen Crozier	191	9.2	
Majority		1078		
Turnout			28.9	

=== Winlaton and High Spen ===
Winlaton and High Spen
Party	Candidate	Votes	%	±%
Labour	Marilyn Charlton	1,581	64.4	
Conservative	Lewis Ormston	515	21.0	
Liberal Democrats	Amelia Ord	186	7.6	
Green	Paul McNally	172	7.0	
Majority		1066		
Turnout			36.3	
