= 2021 Gateshead Metropolitan Borough Council election =

2021 UK local government election

- 6 May 2021

22 out of 66 seats to Gateshead Metropolitan Borough Council 34 seats needed for a majority
- Turnout: 51,301 (35.5%)

	First party	Second party
Leader	Martin Gannon	Jonathan Wallace
Party	Labour	Liberal Democrats
Last election	52 seats, 44.5%	14 seats, 26.9%
Seats before	51	12
Seats won	19	5
Seats after	52	13
Seat change	▲1	▲1
Popular vote	25,633	11,261
Percentage	46.8%	20.6%
Swing	▲2.3%	▼6.3%
- Map showing the results of the 2021 Gateshead Metropolitan Borough Council election
Council control before election
{{{before_election}}}
Labour
Council control after election
Labour

The 2021 Gateshead Metropolitan Borough Council election took place on 6 May 2021 to elect members of Gateshead Metropolitan Borough Council in England on the same day as other local elections. One-third of the seats were up for election, with two wards (Birtley and Lamesley) electing two councillors.

== Results summary ==
2021 Gateshead Metropolitan Borough Council election
Party	This election			Full council			This election		
Party	Seats	Net	Seats %	Other	Total	Total %	Votes	Votes %	+/−
Labour	19	Steady	79.2	33	52	78.8	25,633	46.8	▲2.5
Liberal Democrats	5	Steady	20.8	8	13	19.7	11,261	20.6	▼6.2
Independent	0	Steady	0.0	1	1	1.5	213	0.4	▼0.2
Conservative	0	Steady	0.0	0	0	0.0	12,344	22.5	▲11.9
Green	0	Steady	0.0	0	0	0.0	4,830	8.8	▲0.1
TUSC	0	Steady	0.0	0	0	0.0	288	0.5	New
Workers Party	0	Steady	0.0	0	0	0.0	200	0.4	New
Save Us Now	0	Steady	0.0	0	0	0.0	90	0.2	-0.7
Reform	0	Steady	0.0	0	0	0.0	71	0.1	New

== Ward results ==
=== Birtley ===
Birtley
Party	Candidate	Votes	%	±%
Labour	Hazel Weatherley	977	53.2	+14.9%
Labour	Catherine Davison	898	49.0	+10.7%
Liberal Democrats	Paul Elliott	764	41.6	+25.5%
Conservative	Joseph Callanan	496	26.0	+20.6%
Conservative	Richard Herdman	366	20.0	+12.6%
Green	Jonathon Taylor	169	9.2	New
Majority		134	7.3	
Turnout		1,841	28.9	
Registered electors		6,159		
Labour hold		Swing		
Labour hold		Swing		

=== Blaydon ===
Blaydon
Party	Candidate	Votes	%	±%
Labour	Stephen Ronchetti	1,165	52.1	−3.5%
Conservative	Susan Wilson	642	28.7	+17.4%
Green	Simon Easton	290	13.0	−6.1%
Liberal Democrats	Amelia Ord	139	6.2	−1.2%
Majority		523	23.2	
Turnout		2,250	31.3	
Registered electors		7,178		
Labour hold		Swing		

=== Bridges ===
Bridges
Party	Candidate	Votes	%	±%
Labour	John Eagle	916	55.6	−5.7%
Conservative	Martin Backley	357	21.7	+6.3%
Green	Nicholas Rush-Cooper	237	14.4	New
Liberal Democrats	Gareth Cooper	138	8.4	−14.9%
Majority		559	33.6	
Turnout		1,665	27.2	
Registered electors		6,116		
Labour hold		Swing		

=== Chopwell and Rowlands Gill ===
Chopwell and Rowlands Gill
Party	Candidate	Votes	%	±%
Labour	Dave Bradford	1,464	53.7	+4.8%
Conservative	Brian Derrick	672	24.7	+15.1%
Green	David Castleton	275	10.1	−2.5%
Workers Party	Andrew Metcalf	200	7.3	New
Liberal Democrats	Jean Callender	115	4.2	−5.1%
Majority		792	28.9	
Turnout		2,739	40.5	
Registered electors		6,764		
Labour hold		Swing		

=== Chowdene ===
Chowdene
Party	Candidate	Votes	%	±%
Labour	John McElroy	1,254	52.6	+5.3%
Conservative	David Potts	597	25.0	+12.5%
Liberal Democrats	Dawn Welsh	298	12.5	−6.9%
Green	Thomas Newell	167	7.0	New
TUSC	Marika Smith	68	2.9	New
Majority		657	27.5	
Turnout		2,391	35.5	
Registered electors		6,742		
Labour hold		Swing		

=== Crawcrook and Greenside ===
Crawcrook and Greenside
Party	Candidate	Votes	%	±%
Labour	Kathleen McCartney	1,241	42.9	+1.4%
Green	Diane Cadman	920	31.8	+6.0%
Conservative	Christopher Coxon	654	22.6	+12.8%
Liberal Democrats	David Randall	81	2.8	−4.4%
Majority		321	11.0	
Turnout		2,911	41.5	
Registered electors		7,019		
Labour hold		Swing		

=== Deckham ===
Deckham
Party	Candidate	Votes	%	±%
Labour	Leigh Kirton	1,036	55.0	−2.8%
Conservative	Josh Knotts	516	27.4	+13.6%
Liberal Democrats	Norman Spurs	169	9.0	−2.8%
Green	Gary Brooks	94	5.0	−11.6%
TUSC	Norman Hall	68	3.6	New
Majority		520	27.4	
Turnout		1,900	29.6	
Registered electors		6,409		
Labour hold		Swing		

=== Dunston and Teams ===
Dunston and Teams
Party	Candidate	Votes	%	±%
Labour	Brenda Clelland	1,118	62.1	+3.5%
Conservative	Jordan-Lee Guthrie	388	21.6	+11.0%
Green	Andy Blanchflower	137	7.6	−7.8%
Liberal Democrats	Beth Gordon	116	6.4	−1.9%
Save Us Now	Susan Hall	41	2.3	−4.8%
Majority		730	40.3	
Turnout		1,811	28.8	
Registered electors		6,294		
Labour hold		Swing		

=== Dunston Hill and Whickham East ===
Dunston Hill and Whickham East
Party	Candidate	Votes	%	±%
Liberal Democrats	Peter Maughan	1,325	48.6	−4.1%
Labour	Lee-Ann Moir	843	30.9	+0.8%
Conservative	Jak Hocking	376	13.8	+9.1%
Green	Isabel Blanchflower	153	5.6	−1.7%
Save Us Now	Graham Steele	31	1.1	−4.1%
Majority		482	17.6	
Turnout		2,744	41.1	
Registered electors		6,679		
Liberal Democrats hold		Swing		

=== Felling ===
Felling
Party	Candidate	Votes	%	±%
Labour	Sonya Dickie	871	57.4	−6.7%
Conservative	Peter Jackson	354	23.3	+10.5%
Liberal Democrats	David Fawcett	178	11.7	−11.4%
Green	Neil Grant	115	7.6	New
Majority		517	33.9	
Turnout		1,523	26.8	
Registered electors		5,686		
Labour hold		Swing		

=== High Fell ===
High Fell
Party	Candidate	Votes	%	±%
Labour	Jill Green	861	50.1	−6.3%
Conservative	Francis Athey	390	22.7	+10.0%
Independent	Thomas Holder	189	11.0	New
TUSC	Elaine Brunskill	102	5.9	−3.2%
Liberal Democrats	Robinson Stanaway	81	4.7	−7.4%
Green	Gabriel Rubinstein	70	4.1	New
Independent	Andrew Marshall	24	1.4	New
Majority		471	27.3	
Turnout		1,727	28.4	
Registered electors		6,072		
Labour hold		Swing		

=== Lamesley ===
Lamesley
Party	Candidate	Votes	%	±%
Labour	Judith Turner	1,218	59.8	+7.0%
Labour	Jane McCoid	1,040	51.0	−1.8%
Conservative	Sheila Everatt	811	39.8	+18.7%
Conservative	Ali Pargam	504	24.8	+3.7%
Green	Ashleigh McLean	276	13.6	New
Liberal Democrats	Daniel Clarke	225	11.0	+0.8%
Majority		229	11.2	
Turnout		2,038	27.8	
Registered electors		7,323		
Labour hold		Swing		
Labour hold		Swing		

=== Lobley Hill and Bensham ===
Lobley Hill and Bensham
Party	Candidate	Votes	%	±%
Labour	Catherine Donovan	1,295	56.6	+7.6%
Conservative	Janice Hutchinson	605	26.4	+12.9%
Green	Andy Redfern	211	9.2	−5.4%
Liberal Democrats	Lynda Duggan	177	7.7	−9.8%
Majority		690	30.0	
Turnout		2,300	33.1	
Registered electors		6,959		
Labour hold		Swing		

=== Low Fell ===
Low Fell
Party	Candidate	Votes	%	±%
Liberal Democrats	Daniel Duggan	1,730	51.0	−6.9%
Labour	Calvin Lawson	1,166	34.4	+8.0%
Conservative	Paul Sterling	312	9.2	+3.0%
Green	Mark Gorman	186	5.5	−4.0%
Majority		564	16.6	
Turnout		3,406	48.8	
Registered electors		6,978		
Liberal Democrats hold		Swing		

=== Pelaw and Heworth ===
Pelaw and Heworth
Party	Candidate	Votes	%	±%
Liberal Democrats	Ian Patterson	1,392	56.2	+4.7%
Labour	Vinnie Humphries	744	30.0	−0.6%
Conservative	John Gardiner	176	7.1	+4.5%
Green	Nick Boldrini	166	6.7	+1.4%
Majority		648	26.1	
Turnout		2,485	38.4	
Registered electors		6,478		
Liberal Democrats hold		Swing		

=== Ryton Crookhill and Stella ===
Ryton Crookhill and Stella
Party	Candidate	Votes	%	±%
Labour	Christopher Buckley	1,547	53.6	+4.4%
Conservative	Lucinda Wilson	545	18.9	+11.7%
Liberal Democrats	Julie Maughan	339	11.7	−5.7%
Green	Andrew Mason	334	11.6	+5.1%
Reform	Stephen Osborne	71	2.5	New
TUSC	Ros Cooper	50	1.7	−0.2%
Majority		1002	34.6	
Turnout		2,894	41.9	
Registered electors		6,909		
Labour hold		Swing		

=== Saltwell ===
Saltwell
Party	Candidate	Votes	%	±%
Labour	Denise Robson	877	44.1	−7.0%
Liberal Democrats	Leanne Brand	590	29.6	+17.0%
Conservative	Alan Bond	320	16.1	−3.2%
Green	Rachel Cabral	185	9.3	−7.7%
Save Us Now	Craig Gallagher	18	0.9	New
Majority		287	14.3	
Turnout		2,006	32.5	
Registered electors		6,174		
Labour hold		Swing		

=== Wardley and Leam Lane ===
Wardley and Leam Lane
Party	Candidate	Votes	%	±%
Labour	Linda Green	1,266	59.6	+5.7%
Conservative	John McNeil	590	27.8	+17.9%
Liberal Democrats	Amanda Wintcher	136	6.4	−7.3%
Green	John Aspinall	131	6.2	New
Majority		676	31.7	
Turnout		2,133	35.4	
Registered electors		6,022		
Labour hold		Swing		

=== Whickham North ===
Whickham North
Party	Candidate	Votes	%	±%
Liberal Democrats	Sonya Hawkins	1,464	56.8	−13.6%
Labour	Jeff Bowe	574	22.3	−0.2%
Conservative	John Callanan	448	17.4	+10.3%
Green	Tom Jamieson	92	3.6	New
Majority		1016	39.3	
Turnout		2,586	41.3	
Registered electors		6,258		
Liberal Democrats hold		Swing		

=== Whickham South and Sunniside ===
Whickham South and Sunniside
Party	Candidate	Votes	%	±%
Liberal Democrats	Jonathan Mohammed	1,471	49.1	−23.8%
Labour	Pamela Burns	699	23.3	+5.1%
Conservative	Perry Wilson	656	21.9	+13.1%
Green	Bryony Taylor	170	5.7	New
Majority		722	24.0	
Turnout		3,005	45.7	
Registered electors		6,573		
Liberal Democrats hold		Swing		

=== Windy Nook and Whitehills ===
Windy Nook and Whitehills
Party	Candidate	Votes	%	±%
Labour	Rachel Mullen	1,199	55.0	−3.4%
Conservative	Kyle Murray	601	27.6	+14.6%
Liberal Democrats	Susan Walker	220	10.1	−4.2%
Green	Christina Grant	160	7.3	−7.0%
Majority		598	27.2	
Turnout		2,197	31.2	
Registered electors		7,049		
Labour hold		Swing		

=== Winlaton and High Spen ===
Winlaton and High Spen
Party	Candidate	Votes	%	±%
Labour	Julie Simpson	1,364	49.8	−4.3%
Conservative	Lewis Ormston	968	35.4	+16.8%
Green	Paul McNally	292	10.7	−8.5%
Liberal Democrats	Steven Hawkins	113	4.1	−4.0%
Majority		396	14.4	
Turnout		2,749	40.5	
Registered electors		6,788		
Labour hold		Swing		
