= Dunston, Tyne and Wear =

Area of Gateshead, Tyne and Wear, England

Coordinates: 54.952°N 1.639°W

Dunston
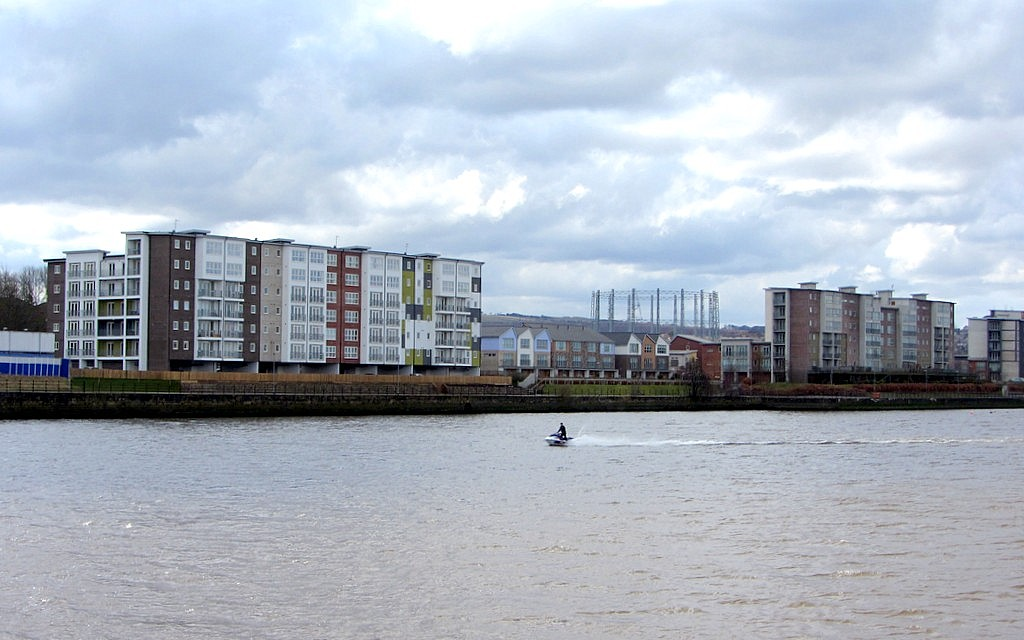
- The River Tyne

- Location within Tyne and Wear
- Metropolitan borough: Gateshead
- Metropolitan county: Tyne and Wear
- Region: North East
- Country: England
- Sovereign state: United Kingdom
- Post town: Gateshead
- Postcode district: NE11
- Dialling code: 0191
- Police: Northumbria
- Fire: Tyne and Wear
- Ambulance: North East
- UK Parliament: Gateshead Central and Whickham

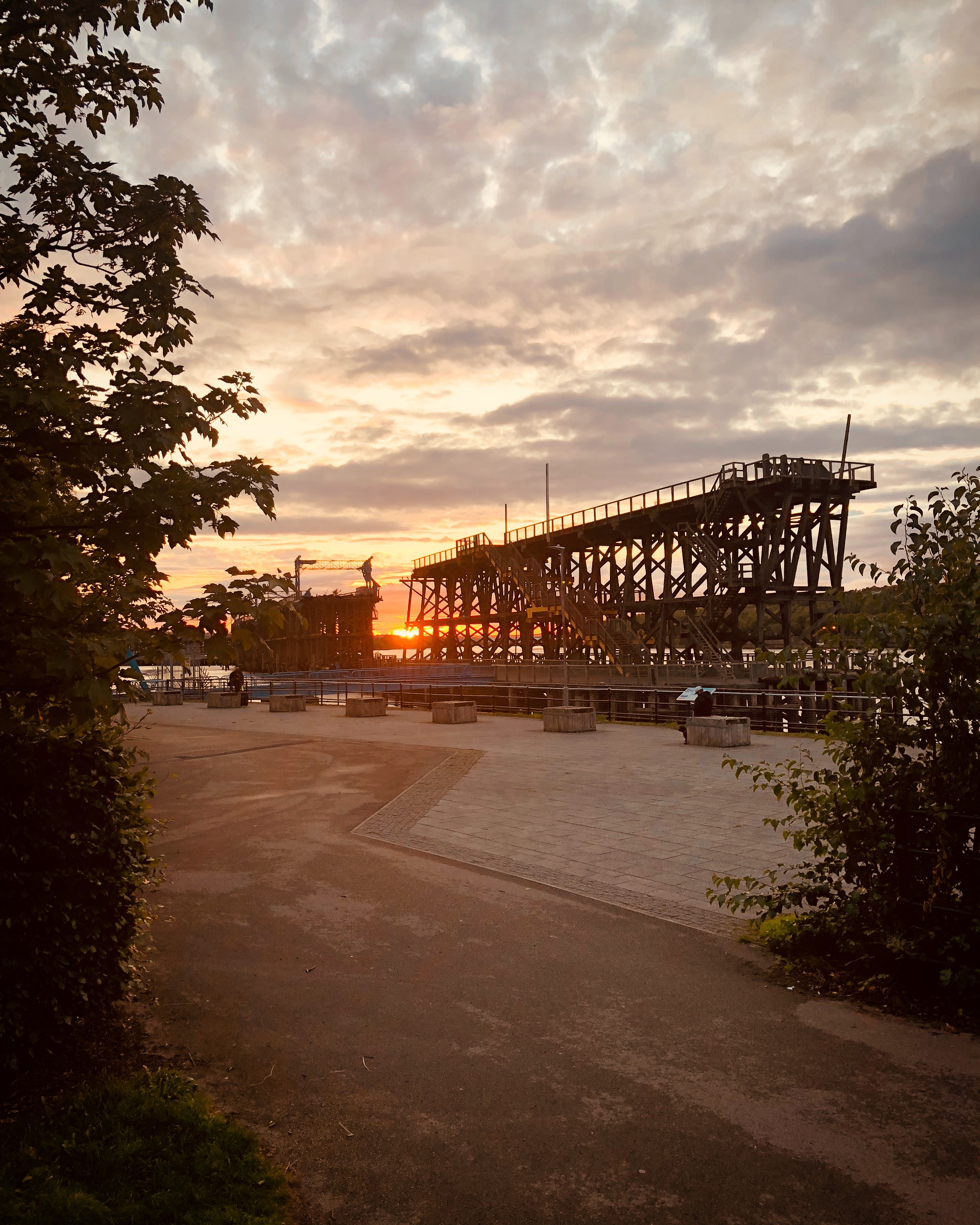
Dunston Staiths and river front, 2018

Dunston is a western area of the town of Gateshead on the south bank of the River Tyne, in the Metropolitan Borough of Gateshead, North East England (into which it was absorbed in 1974). Dunston had a population of 18,326 at the 2011 Census.

== History ==
It has been speculated that Dunston started its existence as a farm or estate of a man named Dunn. Historically part of County Durham, Dunston was first mentioned in 1328. Salmon fishing and farming were important industries in Dunston from at least the 14th century. Coal mining on a small-scale was also important but by the 17th century, the proximity of the river aided the development of large-scale coal mining in the village. During the Great Tyne Flood of 1771 villagers had to be rescued by boat from the roofs and upper stories of their houses.

On 6 June 1993 the IRA attacked a gas holder in the area. The damage was limited, and no one was injured.

== Geography ==
Dunston is split into two areas separated by the A1 dual carriageway. Much of the area south of the A1 is known as Dunston Hill. For electoral purposes, the northern section is grouped along with the Teams area to form Dunston and Teams ward, while the southern section is combined with parts of Whickham, forming Dunston Hill and Whickham East.

== Buildings ==
To the west of Dunston is the site of Dunston Power Station, now demolished. The site is now home to Costco, with the MetroCentre (at this time the largest shopping and leisure complex in Europe), occupying the former site of the station's ash ponds. The Gateshead-based Go-Ahead Group has constructed a new bus depot to replace its Sunderland Road and Winlaton depots on the eastern part of the power station site. Another Dunston landmark was the Derwent Tower (commonly known as "The Rocket"), a tower block that was once the highest building in Gateshead. It was designed by the Owen Luder Partnership and completed in 1973. A well-known structure that had appeared in two films, it was demolished in 2012. It had always proved unpopular with residents, and fallen into a poor condition: Gateshead Council decided that the renovation costs would be prohibitive. The 1960s Tower Court development has now been replaced by new housing and shops. Luder also designed the similarly maligned Trinity Centre Multi-Storey Car Park (known for its appearance in the 1971 gangster thriller Get Carter, and now demolished) in Gateshead town centre.

== Education ==
Schools include Kingsmeadow Community Comprehensive School.

== Transport ==
Dunston is served by Dunston railway station on the Tyne Valley Line.

== Sports ==
Dunston has an association football club called Dunston UTS F.C.; it plays in the Northern Premier League Division One North West.

== Notable people ==
- Harry Clasper, rower and boat builder
- Paul Gascoigne, footballer
- Victoria Hopper, actress and singer
- Ray Hudson, footballer
- Brian Johnson, lead singer of AC/DC
