= Derwent Tower =

Demolished apartment building in Dunston, England

Coordinates: 54°57′7.7″N 1°38′21.99″W

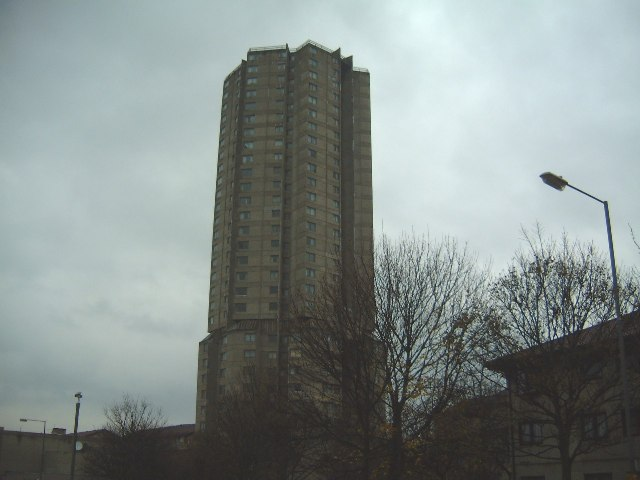
- Derwent Tower in 2005
- Interactive map of the Derwent Tower area
- Alternative names: Dunston Rocket

General information
- Status: Demolished
- Location: Ellison Road, Gateshead, NE11 9DF
- Completed: 1972
- Demolished: 2012

Height
- Height: 85 m (280 ft)

Design and construction
- Architect: Owen Luder

Derwent Tower was a 29-storey residential apartment building in Dunston, Tyne and Wear, United Kingdom. It was opened in 1972. Due to its unusual shape it was nicknamed the "Dunston Rocket" during construction (even before its official Derwent Tower title) and the name remained with locals throughout its life. It was demolished in 2012.

The tower was designed by the Owen Luder Partnership on behalf of Whickham Urban District Council, which at the time controlled the Dunston area of Gateshead. The original brief was for three high-rise blocks of at least 22 storeys, but due to adverse ground conditions on site, the decision was made to build one tower, with the rest being low-rise blocks of two to five storeys. Despite the architect's advice against construction of a high-rise building on the site, the council was strongly in favour. Following many consultations and explanatory models of the foundations with specialists, construction of the foundations began in February 1968, and the tower was completed in March 1971.

Construction was complex because of the very poor ground conditions. The foundations were based on a sunken concrete caisson, which was built above ground then sunk over a period of time. Caisson foundations are often found in harbour construction; being used in the 1960s for a local authority tower block was a first, and the caisson became an underground garage area for residents.

The tower had a very bold and striking appearance, unlike any other tower block or high-rise building in the UK. It was of a Brutalist design with many design similarities with Gateshead's "Get Carter car park" – which likewise was designed by the Owen Luder Partnership. The tower housed two-bedroom flats up to the 10th floor and one-bedroom flats on floors 11 to 29. It featured in a 1970s advert for Tudor Crisps.

Unusual features were:

- Height 85 m (280 ft)
- Unusual construction methods
- Plan form change between the 10th and 11th floors to accommodate building services, including two 10,000-gallon water tanks
- Flying buttresses from the ground to the fifth floor, to assist the foundations
- Unusual foundations including an underground spiral car park (closed to residents for many years, due to repeated flooding.)
- Brutalist form
- Exposed elements of structure and services, i.e. flying buttresses from floor level and exposed water tanks.

The tower was in desperate need of refurbishment for many years, making it unpopular with residents and locals. It had been allowed to fall into a run-down state through neglect and lack of maintenance. Breakdowns in services – including lift failures and water supply faults – were all common, but were unlikely to be a result of the tower's design or construction methods. In 2007, amid health and safety concerns over the already poor and deteriorating services, Gateshead Council decided to relocate the residents.

On 17 August 2009 the tower failed in gaining listed status on the grounds of it being a non-listable building. In January 2012 demolition began, completed in September 2012.
