= South London Theatre =

Theatre in West Norwood, London, England

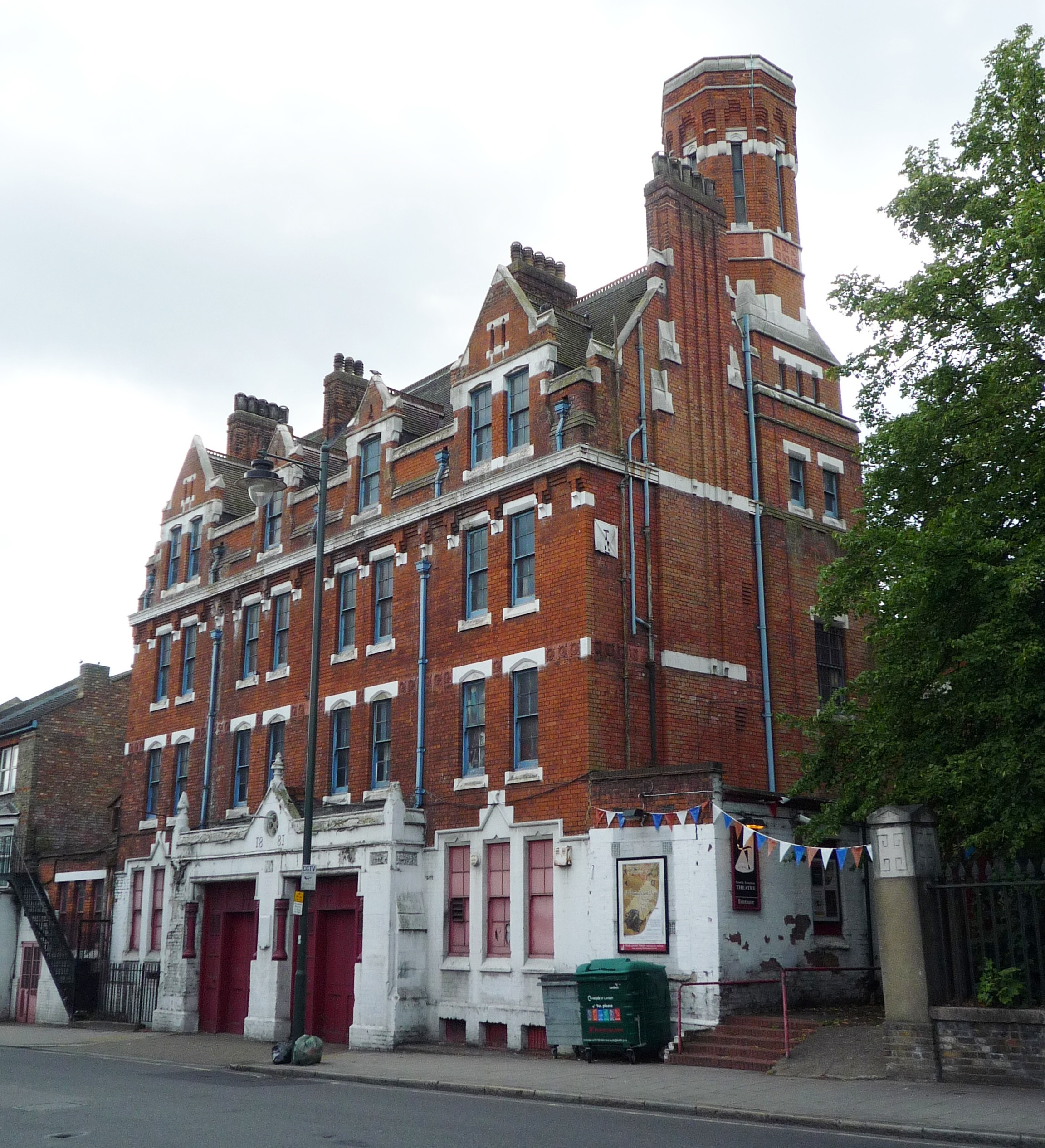
- The theatre in 2011
- Interactive map of South London Theatre
- Former names: South London Theatre Centre
- Address: 2A Norwood High Street; London, SE27; United Kingdom
- Coordinates: 51.431915°N 0.103191°W
- Capacity: 75–104 depending on configuration
- Type: Community theatre
- Public transit: West Norwood

Construction
- Opened: 1967; 59 years ago
- Rebuilt: 2016–2018
- Years active: 1967 to present
- Architect: Owen Luder

Website
- http://www.southlondontheatre.co.uk

Listed Building – Grade II
- Official name: West Norwood Fire Station
- Designated: 25 January 2006
- Reference no.: 1392336

The South London Theatre is a community theatre housed in a Grade II listed former fire station, in West Norwood in the London Borough of Lambeth, England. The first play opened in October 1967, and it is now a busy theatrical venue, presenting more than 22 shows annually in its theatre space, which was remodelled during refurbishment of the Old Fire Station during the period 2015–2018. The theatre facilities also consist of two dedicated rehearsal spaces, an entire floor of wardrobe rooms and a private basement bar, open Sunday to Friday evenings to audiences and members and which plays host to regular social events.

The adult theatre group welcomes both Full Members (participatory) and Friends of SLT (audience supporters) and stages productions across genres, including Shakespeare, theatrical classics, comedy, pantomime, musicals and modern cutting-edge drama. New writing is particularly encouraged, as are aspiring directors. All involvement at the theatre is on a volunteer basis with support and basic training provided as required.

Additionally, there is an active youth group (known as the "SLT Youth Theatre") offering classes for young people aged 7–18yrs, on Saturdays during term time. The youth have their own showcases and are also encouraged to participate in the productions of the adult group.

The South London Theatre is a member of the Little Theatre Guild of Great Britain.

== Theatre building ==
The Gothic Revival style former fire station was probably designed by the architect Robert Pearsall at the Metropolitan Board of Works Architect's Department and was built in 1881. It remains a rare example of a fire station built for horse-drawn tenders which still has the look-out tower and original doors in place. Its history as a fire station was short however, as motorised fire appliances, introduced in the early 20th century were too big for its doors, which could not be practicably extended, and the fire station ceased to function as such in 1917. Between 1917 and 1967, the building was used mainly as a church hall for the neighbouring St Luke's Church.

The original design for the conversion to a theatre was by Owen Luder (later to become President of the Royal Institute of British Architects on two occasions). The original theatre was traditional proscenium arch in style, with a fly loft requiring the removal of a floor in part of the first storey. The auditorium had raked seating with a capacity of just under 100. The space was known as Bell Theatre.

In February 1975 a small studio theatre was added in a single storey extension at the South end of the building for "productions which would not fit into the usual theatre pattern." This space was known as Prompt Corner.

Following refurbishment, the theatre now has one large theatre space and several rooms which are available to hire, when not in use by the community group. South London Theatre participates each September in Open House London in order to open to the public for tours.

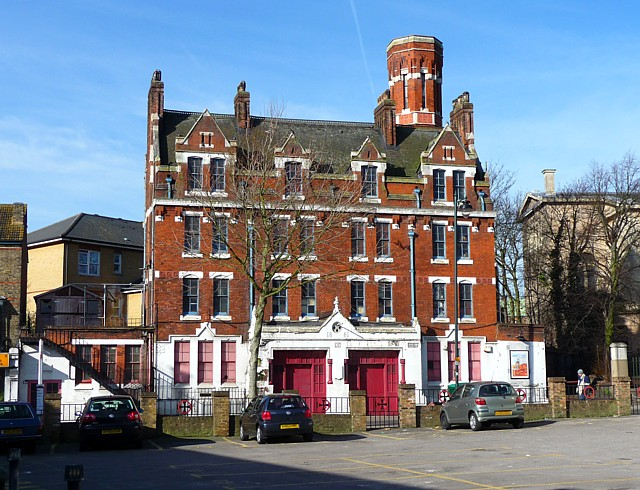
South London Theatre (prior to refurbishment)

== Refurbishment ==
Funds including a National Lottery Heritage Fund grant were secured in 2014 to refurbish the building, making it fully accessible and restoring much of the Victorian character; opening its original main front doors for the first time in 100 years. These doors had been boarded and secured in the Owen Luder design, forming the rear boundary to the Bell Theatre stage space.

Whilst the building was significantly remodelled, the community theatre relocated to Stanley Halls in South Norwood and Youth Group performances were staged in St Luke's Church next door.

In April 2018, the first production was staged in the new and enlarged black box theatre, as the South London Theatre community was returned to West Norwood and the building reopened.

During refurbishment, the theatre spaces were combined and reworked to create the new theatre space and a generous foyer. The fly loft was closed over to reform the floor on the first storey, the earlier single storey extension housing Prompt Corner was demolished, and a four-storey extension added in its footprint, to accommodate part of the new theatre space, along with the technical gallery, props store, toilet facilities and a second staircase to all floors. A lift shaft was also added to the rear of the building. All spaces were then sensitively restored and redecorated, with rooms on the fourth floor named Prompt and Bell in recognition of the former performance spaces. Other rooms have been named The Watch Room and The Kit Room in recognition of their former functions and the building's fire station heritage.

== Patrons ==
=== Current ===
- Simon Russell Beale
- Angela Barnes
