= Yeshiva L'zeirim Tiferes Yaacov =

College in Gateshead, England

Coordinates: 54.9561°N 1.6008°W

- ישיבה לצעירים תפארת יעקב
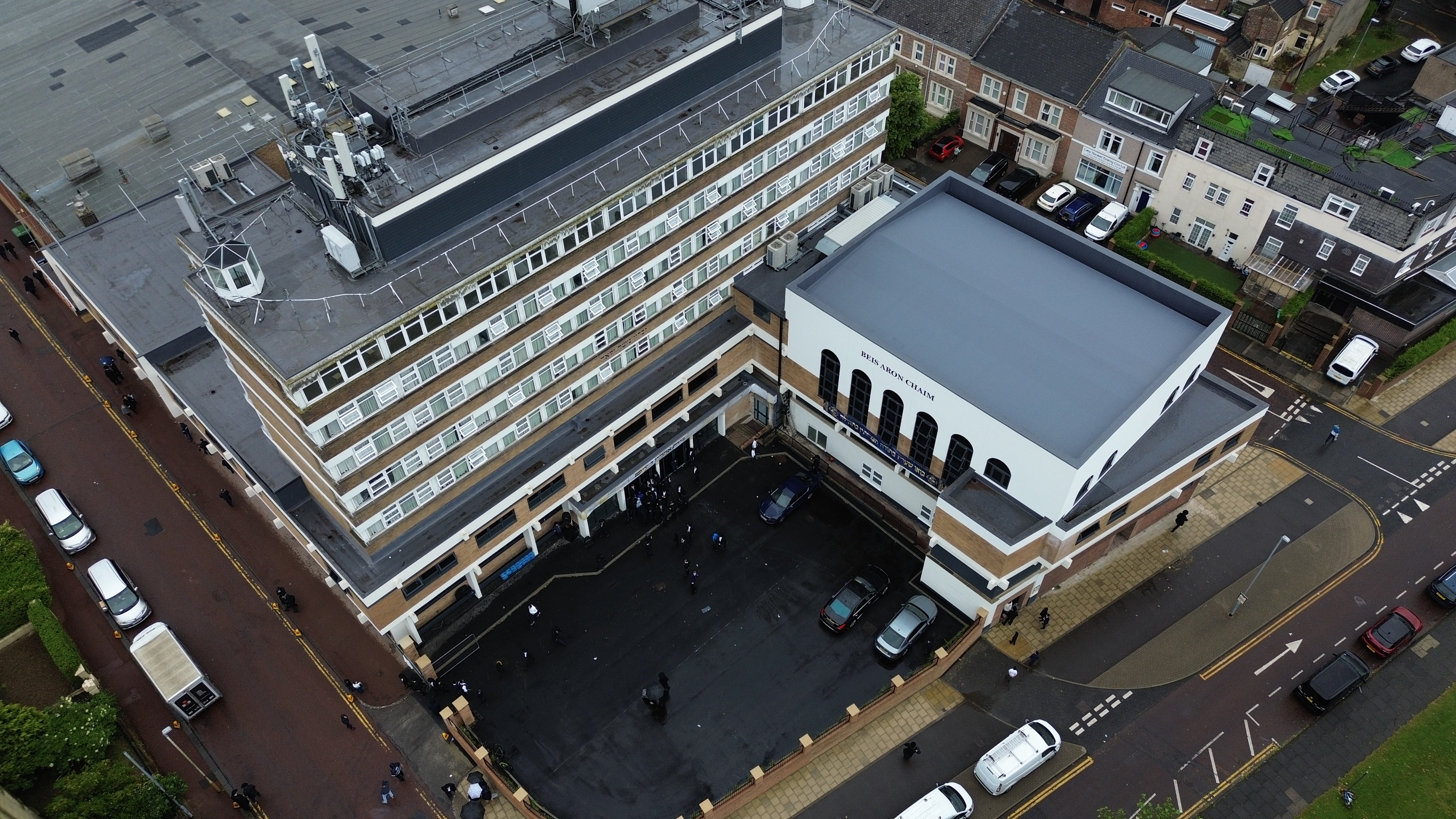

Location
- High West Street; Gateshead, NE8 1PE; United Kingdom

Information
- Religious affiliation: Haredi Judaism
- Established: September 1975; 50 years ago
- Founders: Chaim Kaufman; Ezriel Jaffe
- Rosh yeshiva: Ezriel Jaffe
- Campus: Beis Aron Chaim
- Website: tiferesyaacov.co.uk

Yeshiva L'zeirim Tiferes Yaacov (Hebrew: ישיבה לצעירים תפארת יעקב), colloquially referred to as Gateshead Yeshiva Ketana, is a yeshiva ketana located in Gateshead, England.

The yeshiva was founded in September 1975 by rabbis Chaim Kaufman and Ezriel Jaffe, who together served as the roshei yeshiva. Kaufman continued teaching at the yeshiva for thirty years until his death in October 2005. Jaffe, a graduate of the Gateshead Kolel, remains rosh yeshiva. Rabbi Yehuda Leib Witler served as mashgiach as of 2005, and Rabbi Moshe Chaim Dunner served as mashgiach until his death in 2025. Teachers at the yeshiva include rabbis Yosef Bresslauer, Avrohom Osher Cohen, Yaakov Yehuda Salamon, and formerly Shlomo Steinhaus.

The yeshiva also included a Preparatory Academy, providing a year of schooling for boys aged 15 to 16. The yeshiva building has 24 hour protection by security guards, funded by a government grant administered by the Community Security Trust.

From their opening they had been located at a building on Gladstone Terrace. An Ofsted report in 2017 found that the premises did not meet basic standards, including because the toilets were not provided with hot water.

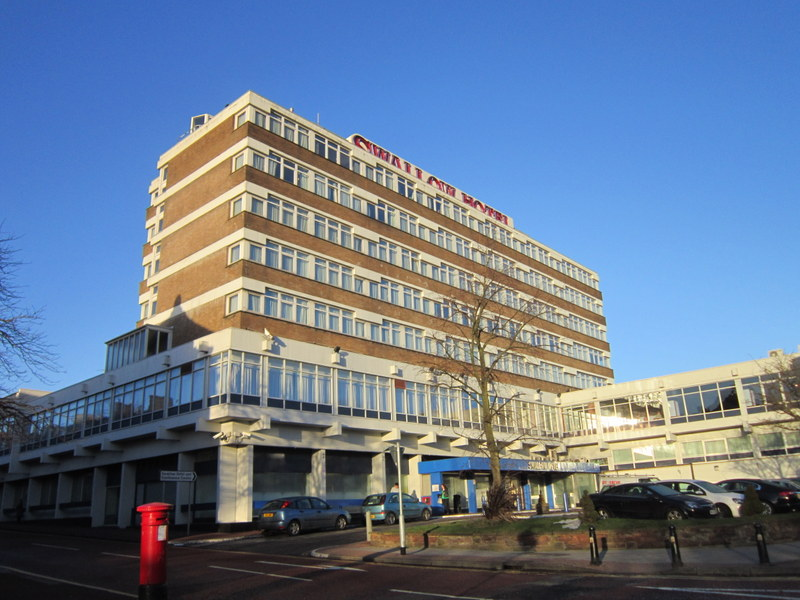
The building in 2013

In 2014, the yeshiva bought the building of the former Swallow Hotel on High West Street, which had previously gone bankrupt and been abandoned due to the competition from the nearby Hilton Hotel. They bought it for a fraction of the building's value, and the sale was supported by philanthropists including the Pels and Reichmann families. They received planning permission in 2014 and converted the guest bedrooms into housing for 250 students and staff. They then built the main study hall on the site of the former restaurant area, and built teaching rooms and catering and dining areas. The main entrance was refurbished with a reclad canopy, brick cladding and small windows, and improved security by building a two-metre iron fence and automatic sliding gate.

The new building was opened in July 2024, and the inauguration ceremony was attended by rabbis Shimon Galai and Dovid Cohen from Israel, and a letter written by Meir Zvi Bergman for the occasion was read. Zanvil Weinberger performed, and the event was photographed by Shuki Lehrer from Israel.
