= Gateshead =

Town in Tyne and Wear, England

- Town
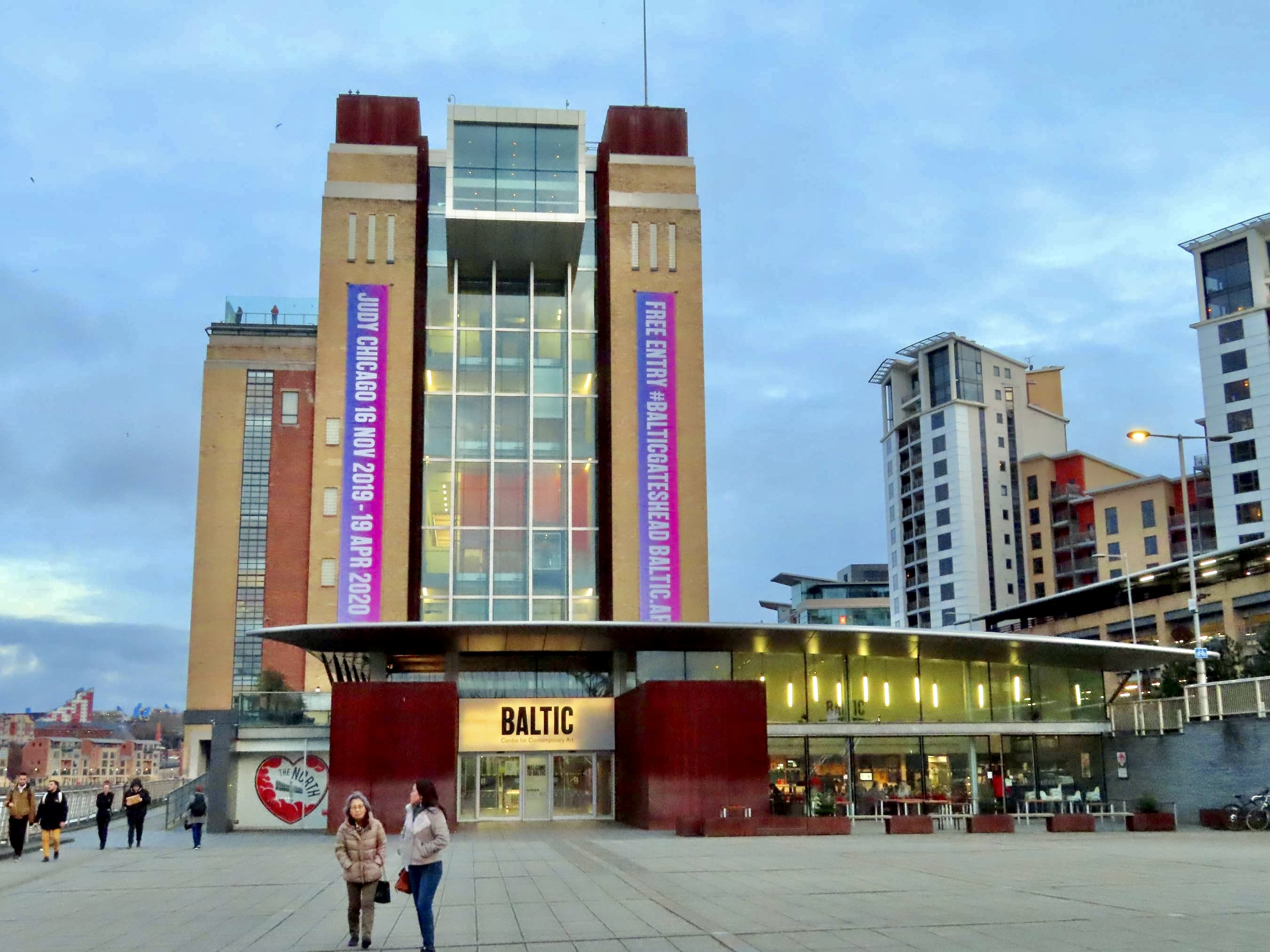
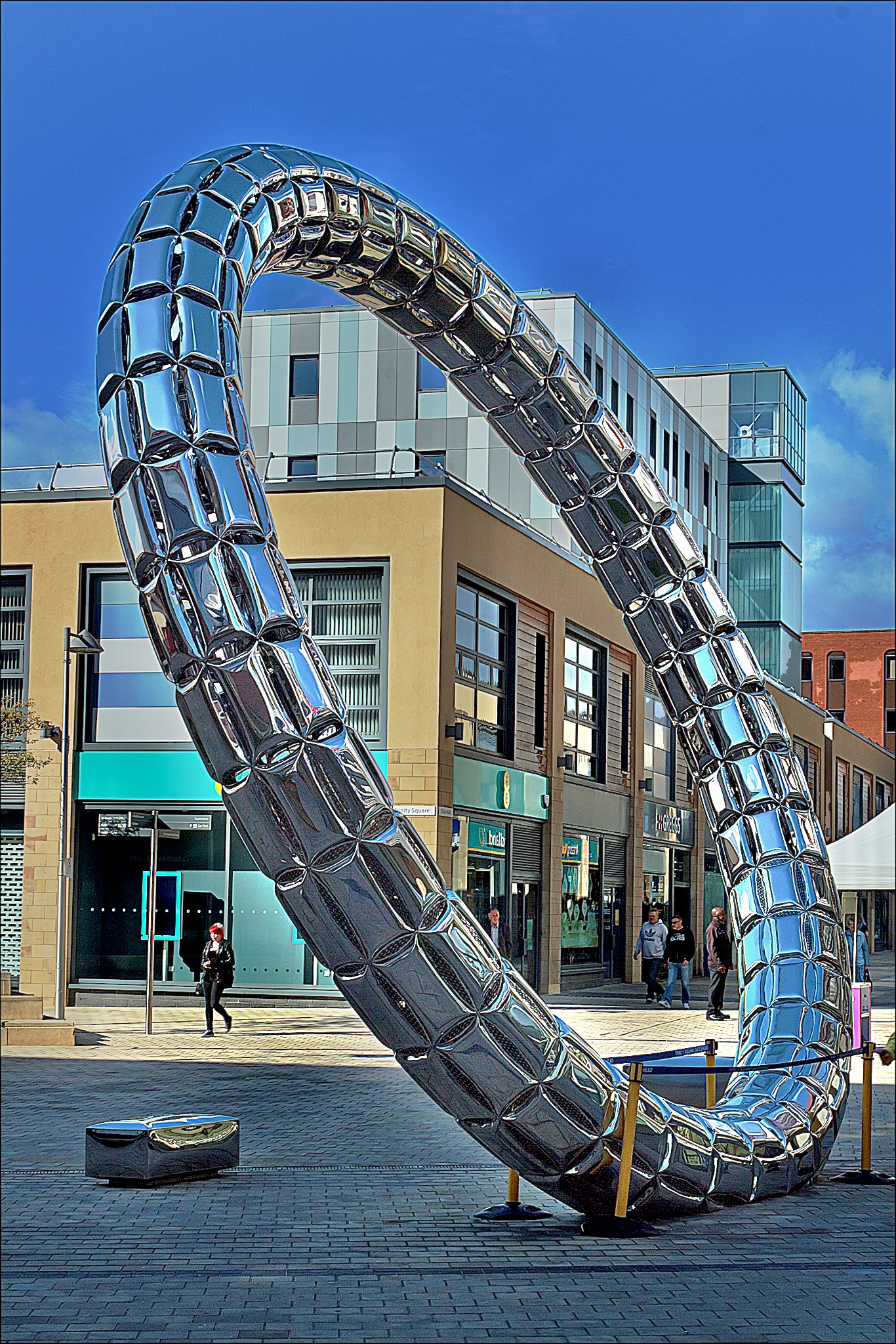
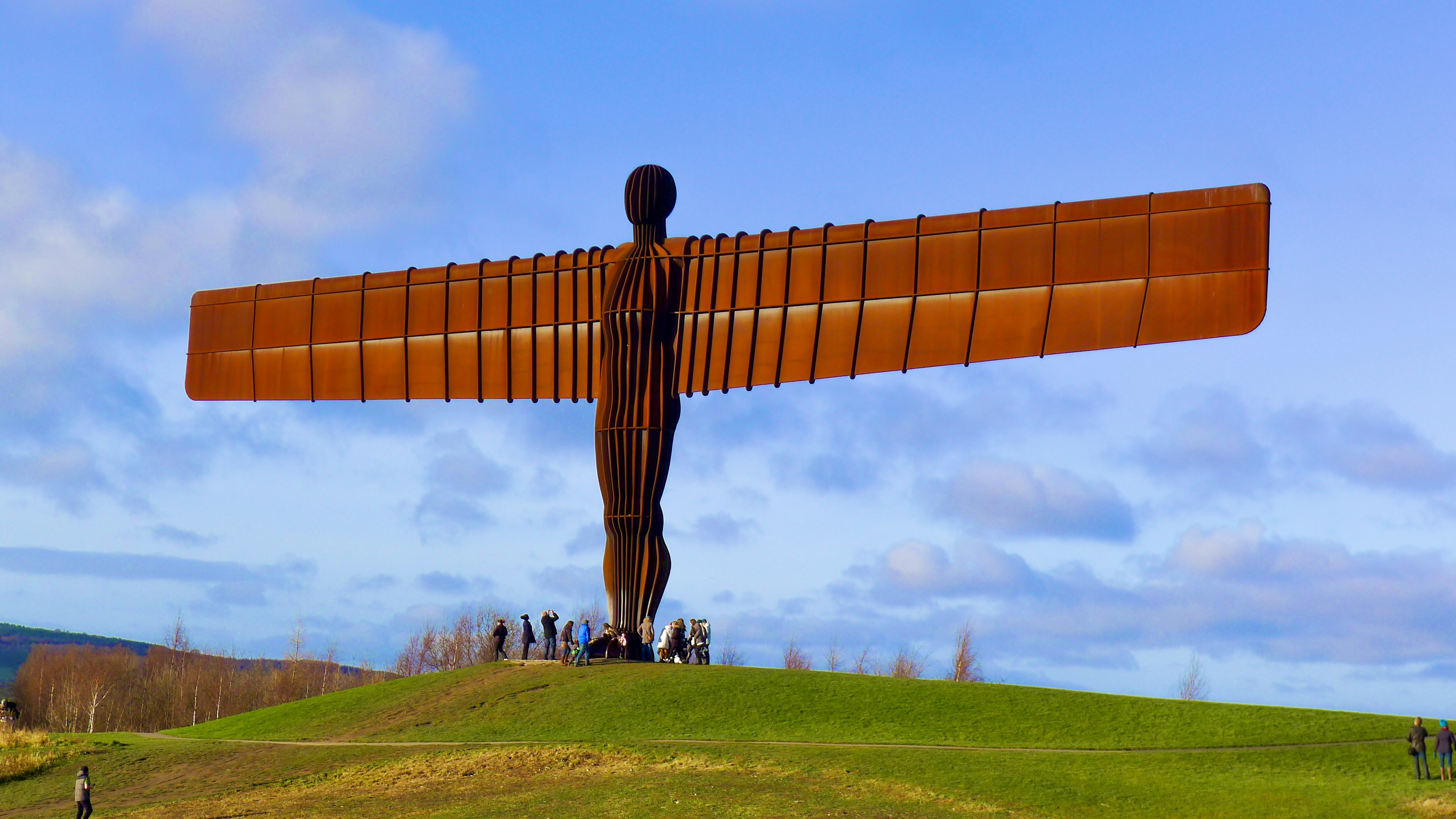
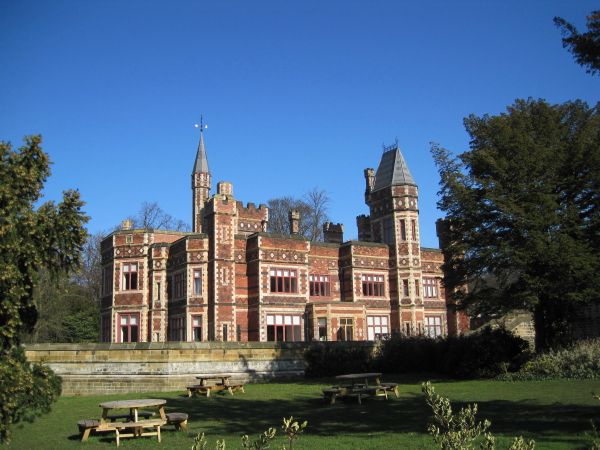
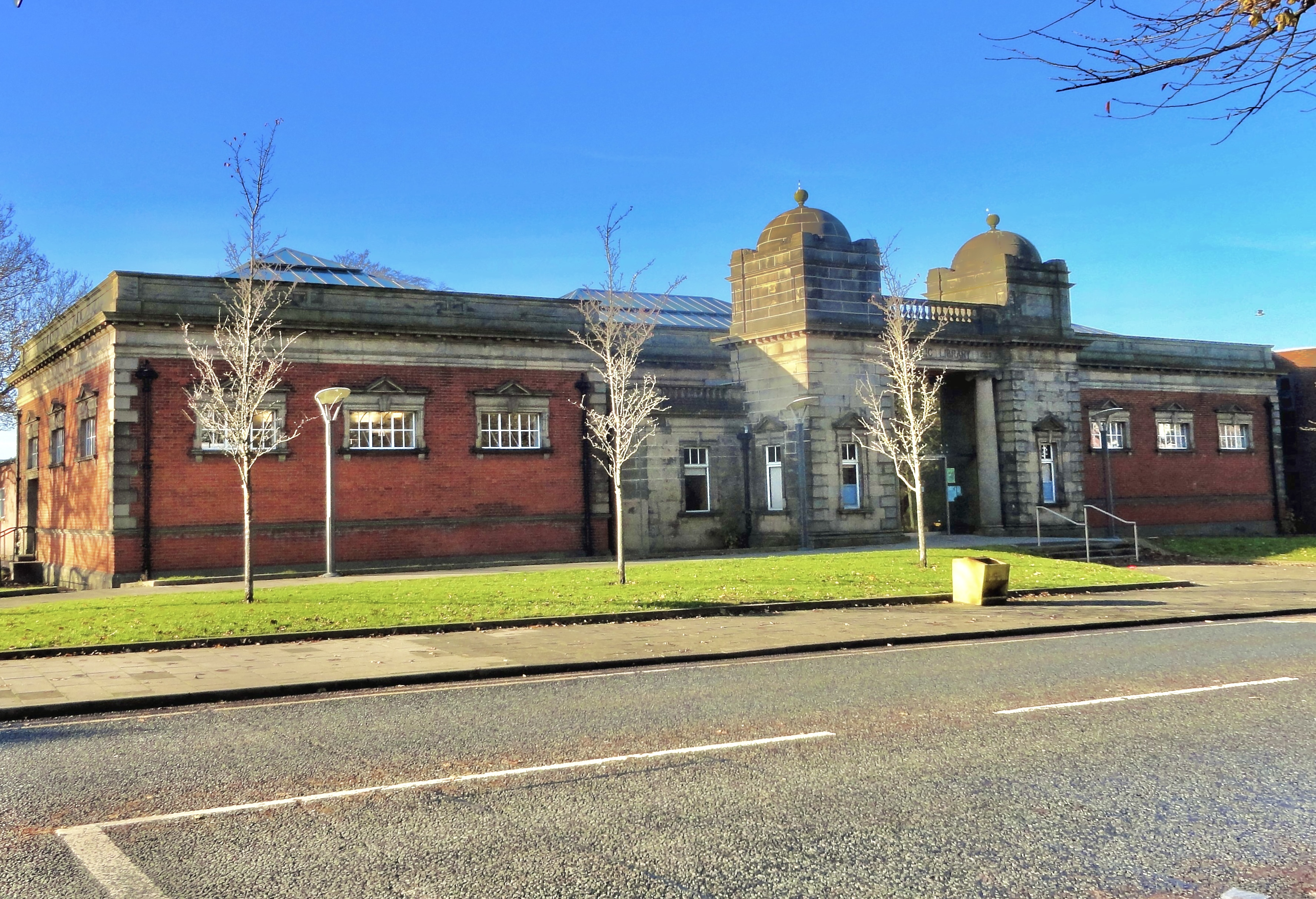
- Upper: BALTIC and The Glasshouse on the Quayside; Middle: Trinity Square Halo and the Angel of the North; Lower: Saltwell Park and the Central Library

- Location within Tyne and Wear
- Population: 199,139
- OS grid reference: NZ2460
- Metropolitan borough: Gateshead
- Metropolitan county: Tyne and Wear
- Region: North East
- Country: England
- Sovereign state: United Kingdom
- Post town: GATESHEAD
- Postcode district: NE8-NE11
- Dialling code: 0191
- Police: Northumbria
- Fire: Tyne and Wear
- Ambulance: North East
- UK Parliament: Gateshead Central and Whickham
- Website: gateshead.gov.uk

Gateshead (/ˈɡeɪts(h)ɛd/) is a town in the Gateshead Metropolitan Borough of Tyne and Wear, England. It is on the River Tyne's southern bank. At the 2021 census, the population was 196,151.

Historically part of County Durham, under the Local Government Act 1888 the town was made a county borough, meaning it was administered independently of the county council.

The town's attractions include the twenty-metre-tall Angel of the North sculpture on the town's southern outskirts, The Glasshouse International Centre for Music and the Baltic Centre for Contemporary Art. The town shares the Millennium Bridge, Tyne Bridge and multiple other bridges with Newcastle upon Tyne.

== Toponymy ==
Gateshead is first mentioned in Latin translation in Bede's Ecclesiastical History of the English People as ad caput caprae ("at the goat's head"). This interpretation is consistent with the later English attestations of the name, among them Gatesheued (c. 1190), literally "goat's head" but in the context of a place-name meaning 'headland or hill frequented by (wild) goats'. Although other derivations have been mooted, it is this that is given by the standard authorities.

A Brittonic predecessor, named with the element *gabro-, 'goat' (cf. Welsh gafr), may underlie the name. Gateshead might have been the Roman-British fort of Gabrosentum.

== History ==
=== Early ===
There has been a settlement on the Gateshead side of the River Tyne, around the old river crossing where the Swing Bridge now stands, since Roman times.

The first recorded mention of Gateshead is in the writings of the Venerable Bede who referred to an Abbot of Gateshead called Utta in 623. In 875, Vikings under Halfdan Ragnarsson sailed into the River Tyne and sacked monasteries at Tynemouth and Jarrow, before setting up camp at Gateshead. In 1068 William the Conqueror defeated the forces of Edgar the Ætheling and Malcolm king of Scotland (Shakespeare's Malcolm) on Gateshead Fell (now Low Fell and Sheriff Hill).

During medieval times Gateshead was under the jurisdiction of the Bishop of Durham. At this time the area was largely forest with some agricultural land. The forest was the subject of Gateshead's first charter, granted in the 12th century by Hugh du Puiset, Bishop of Durham. An alternative spelling may be "Gatishevede", as seen in a legal record, dated 1430.

=== Industrial revolution ===
In 1747, the Team Works of the Hawks family opened in Gateshead with a few forges working up old iron brought in as ballast. In 1750, Russell was launched by Headlam's yard at Gateshead, the largest vessel built on the Tyne up to that time, able to carry 30 keels of coal.

Throughout the Industrial Revolution the population of Gateshead expanded rapidly; between 1801 and 1901 the increase was over 100,000. This expansion resulted in the spread southwards of the town.

In 1854, a catastrophic explosion on the quayside destroyed most of Gateshead's medieval heritage, and caused widespread damage on the Newcastle side of the river.

Sir Joseph Swan lived at Underhill, Low Fell, Gateshead from 1869 to 1883, where his experiments led to the invention of the electric light bulb. The house was the first in the world to be wired for domestic electric light.

In 1889 one of the largest employers (Hawks, Crawshay and Sons) closed down and unemployment has since been a burden. Up to the Second World War there were repeated newspaper reports of the unemployed sending deputations to the council to provide work. The depression years of the 1920s and 1930s created even more joblessness and the Team Valley Trading Estate was built in the mid-1930s to alleviate the situation.

=== Regeneration ===
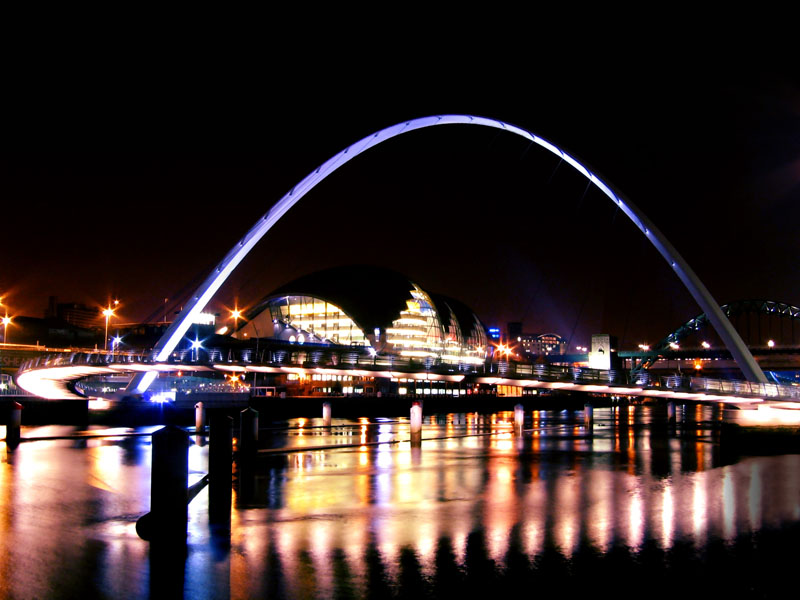
Gateshead Quays across the River Tyne at night – Gateshead Millennium Bridge and behind it The Glasshouse

In the late 2000s, Gateshead Council started to regenerate the town, with the long-term aim of making Gateshead a city. The most extensive transformation occurred in the Quayside, with almost all the structures there being constructed or refurbished in this time.

In the early 2010s regeneration refocused on the town centre. The £150 million Trinity Square development opened in May 2013: it incorporates student accommodation, a cinema, health centre and shops. It was nominated for the Carbuncle Cup in September 2014. The cup was however awarded to another development which involved Tesco, Woolwich Central.

== Governance ==
=== Former ===
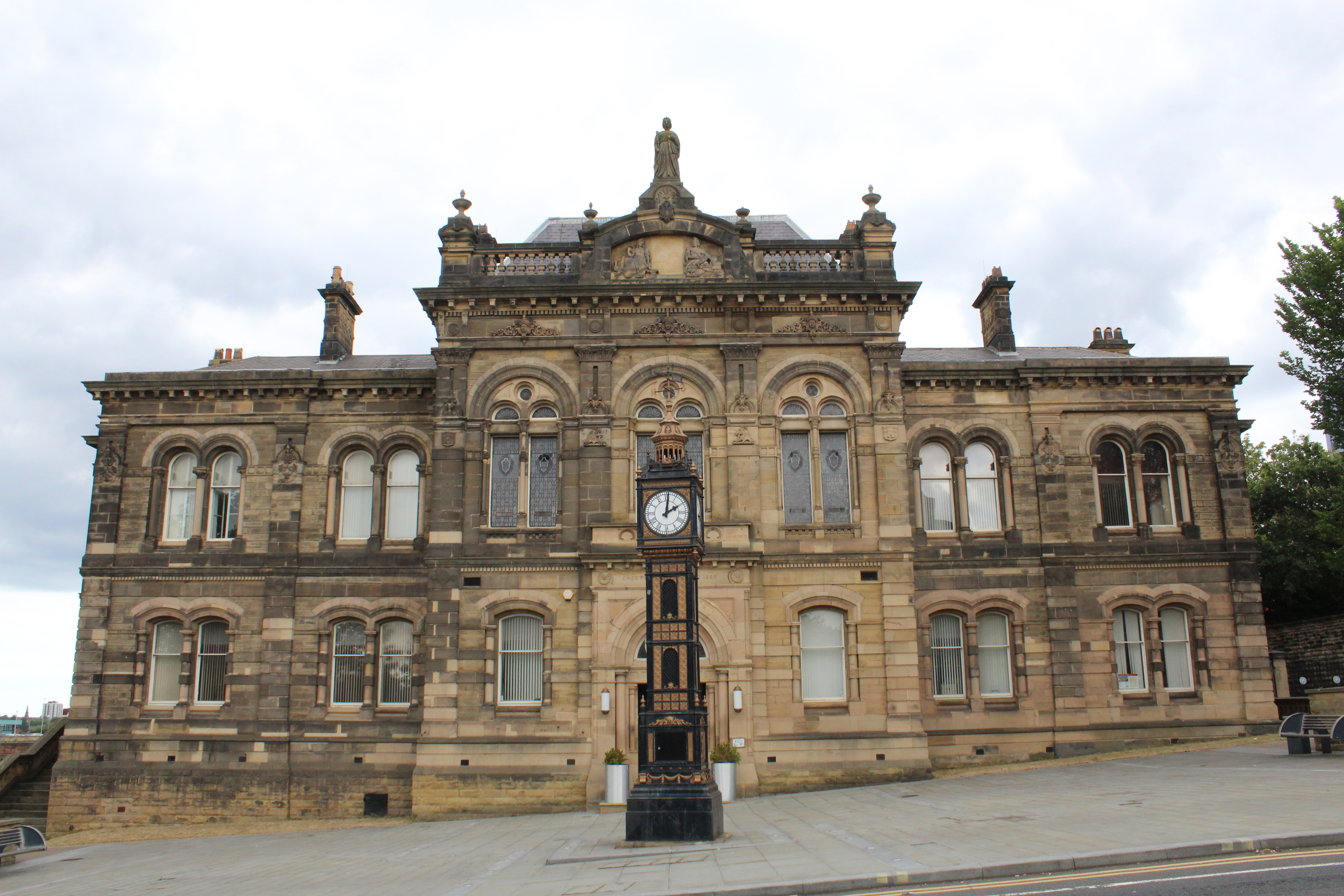
The Old Town Hall

In 1835 Gateshead was established as a municipal borough and in 1889 it was made a county borough, independent from Durham County Council.

In 1870 the Old Town Hall was built, designed by John Johnstone who also designed the previously built Newcastle Town Hall. The ornamental clock in front of the old town hall was presented to Gateshead in 1892 by the mayor, Walter de Lancey Willson, on the occasion of him being elected for a third time. He was also one of the founders of Walter Willson's, a chain of grocers in the North East and Cumbria. The old town hall also served as a magistrate's court and one of Gateshead's police stations.

=== Current ===
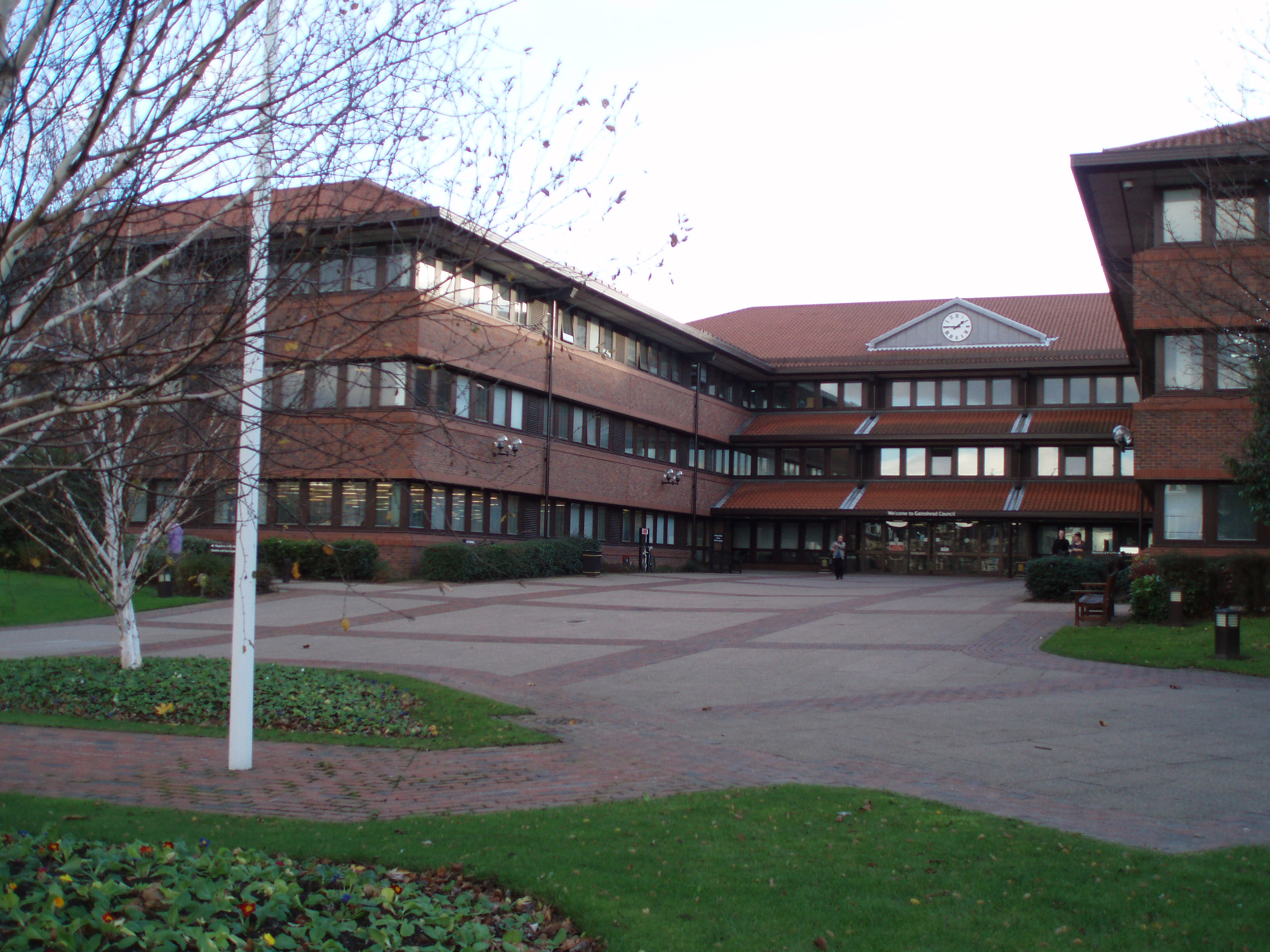
Gateshead Civic Centre completed in 1987

In 1974, following the Local Government Act 1972, the County Borough of Gateshead was merged with the urban districts of Felling, Whickham, Blaydon and Ryton and part of the rural district of Chester-le-Street to create the much larger Metropolitan Borough of Gateshead.

== Geography ==
The town of Gateshead is in the North East of England in the ceremonial county of Tyne and Wear, and within the historic boundaries of County Durham. It is located on the southern bank of the River Tyne at a latitude of 54.57° N and a longitude of 1.35° W. Gateshead experiences a temperate climate which is considerably warmer than some other locations at similar latitudes as a result of the warming influence of the Gulf Stream (via the North Atlantic drift). It is located in the rain shadow of the North Pennines and is therefore in one of the driest regions of the United Kingdom.

One of the most distinguishing features of Gateshead is its topography. The land rises 230 feet (70 m) from Gateshead Quays to the town centre and continues rising to a height of 525 feet (160 m) at Queen Elizabeth Hospital in Sheriff Hill. This is in contrast to the flat and low lying Team Valley located on the western edges of town. The high elevations allow for impressive views over the Tyne valley into Newcastle and across Tyneside to Sunderland and the North Sea from lookouts in Windmill Hills and Windy Nook respectively.

The Office for National Statistics defines the town as an urban sub-division. The 2011 ONS urban sub-division of Gateshead contains the historical County Borough together with areas that the town has absorbed, including Dunston, Felling, Heworth, Pelaw and Bill Quay.

Given the proximity of Gateshead to Newcastle, just south of the River Tyne from the city centre, it is sometimes incorrectly referred to as being a part of Newcastle. Gateshead Council and Newcastle City Council teamed up in 2000 to create a unified marketing brand name, NewcastleGateshead, to better promote the whole of the Tyneside conurbation.

=== Climate ===
Climate in this area has small differences between highs and lows, and there is adequate rainfall year-round to meet the criterion for Oceanic climate, at least 30 mm per month. The Köppen Climate Classification subtype for this climate is "Cfb" (Marine West Coast Climate/Oceanic climate).

Climate data for Gateshead, UK
| Month | Jan | Feb | Mar | Apr | May | Jun | Jul | Aug | Sep | Oct | Nov | Dec | Year |
|---|---|---|---|---|---|---|---|---|---|---|---|---|---|
| Mean daily maximum °C (°F) | 7 (45) | 8 (46) | 10 (50) | 11 (52) | 14 (57) | 17 (63) | 19 (66) | 20 (68) | 17 (63) | 13 (55) | 10 (50) | 7 (45) | 13 (55) |
| Mean daily minimum °C (°F) | 3 (37) | 3 (37) | 4 (39) | 5 (41) | 8 (46) | 10 (50) | 13 (55) | 13 (55) | 10 (50) | 7 (45) | 5 (41) | 3 (37) | 7 (45) |
| Average precipitation mm (inches) | 43 (1.7) | 41 (1.6) | 38 (1.5) | 66 (2.6) | 48 (1.9) | 61 (2.4) | 48 (1.9) | 61 (2.4) | 51 (2) | 61 (2.4) | 66 (2.6) | 56 (2.2) | 640 (25.3) |
Source: Weatherbase

=== Green belt ===
The town is within the wider Tyne & Wear Green Belt, with its portion in much of its surrounding rural area of the borough. It is a part of the local development plan which is in conjunction with Newcastle city borough, and was created in the 1960s.

Its stated aims are to:

- Prevent the merging of settlements, particularly: Gateshead with Hebburn, Washington, Birtley or Whickham …the main built-up area with nearby villages; and villages with each other,
- Safeguard the countryside from encroachment,
- Check unrestricted urban sprawl, and
- Assist in urban regeneration in the city-region by encouraging the recycling of derelict and other urban land.

In the Gateshead borough boundary, as well as the aforementioned areas, it also surrounds the communities of Chopwell, Crawcrook, Greenside, High Spen, Kibblesworth, Lockhaugh, Rowlands Gill, Ryton, Sunniside, as well several small hamlets. Landscape features and facilities such as woods and nature reserves, local golf courses, Burdon Moor and Whinell Hill are also within the green belt area.

=== Districts ===
The town of Gateshead consists of the following districts. Some of them were once separate settlements that were absorbed by encroaching urban sprawl, while others consist entirely of retail, industrial and housing estates. Many of these areas overlap each other and their boundaries are by no means official or fixed. Gateshead is a Town (Urban Subdivision) in the Tyneside urban area.

- Gateshead town centre
- Bensham's ward
  - Team Valley
  - Team Valley Trading Estate
- Deckham's ward
  - Mount Pleasant
  - Carr Hill
  - Old Fold
  - Shipcote (overlaps into two wards)
- Bridges' ward
  - Central
  - Redheugh
- Chowdene's ward
  - Harlow Green
- Dunston and Teams' ward
  - Low Teams
  - Swalwell
- Low Fell
- Whickham East's ward
  - Dunston Hill
- High Fell's ward
  - Black Hill
  - Sheriff Hill
  - Ravensworth
  - Beacon Lough
  - Egremont Estate
- Low Fell's ward
  - Lyndhurst
  - Allerdene
- Saltwell's ward
  - Shipcote (overlaps into two wards)
- Wardley and Leam Lane's ward
  - Follingsby
- Pelaw and Heworth's ward
  - Bill Quay
- Felling
  - North Felling/ Felling Shore (Formerly known as Tyne Main)
  - Falla Park
  - Sunderland Road
- Lamesley's ward
  - Wrekenton
  - Eighton Banks
- Windy Nook and Whitehills' ward
  - Staneway
  - Whitehills Estate

== Demography ==
The table below compares the demographics of Gateshead with the wider Metropolitan borough. The town's population in 2011 was 120,046 compared with 78,403 in 2001. This is due to a slight population increase and boundary and methodology changes since 2001. Felling used to be a separate urban subdivision and had a population of around 35,000, but now it is considered part of Gateshead town. The population of the 2011 census boundaries in 2001 was 113,220, proving that there was some sort of population increase.

Gateshead Ethnicity 2011
| | White British | Asian | Black |
|---|---|---|---|
| Gateshead | 92.0% | 2.5% | 0.8% |
| Metropolitan Borough of Gateshead | 94.0% | 1.9% | 0.5% |

| | White British | Asian | Black |
|---|---|---|---|
| Gateshead | 93.5% | 2.5% | 1.1% |
| Metropolitan Borough of Gateshead | 93.5% | 2.5% | 1.1% |

In 2011, 8.0% of the population of Gateshead Town were from an ethnic minority group (non-indigenous), compared with only 6.0% for the surrounding borough. Despite the borough's low ethnic minority population compared with the England average of 20.2%, it has slightly more ethnic minorities than other boroughs in Tyne and Wear, such as Sunderland or North Tyneside, and two wards near the town centre (Bridges and Saltwell) have minority populations very similar to the national average. The Tyneside metropolitan area, which contains the borough of Gateshead, has a population of 829,300; the NewcastleGateshead urban core area has population of 480,400. The Metropolitan borough of Gateshead had a population of 200,214 in 2011. Gateshead is the main major area in the metropolitan borough and the town takes up around 60% of the borough's population. Other major areas in the borough include Whickham, Birtley, Blaydon-on-Tyne and Ryton.

== Economy ==
Gateshead is home to the MetroCentre, the largest shopping mall in the UK until 2008; and the Team Valley Trading Estate, once the largest and still one of the larger purpose-built commercial estates in the UK.

=== Arts ===
The Baltic Centre for Contemporary Art has been established in a converted flour mill. The Glasshouse International Centre for Music, previously The Sage, a Norman Foster-designed venue for music and the performing arts opened on 17 December 2004. Gateshead also hosted the Gateshead Garden Festival in 1990, rejuvenating 200 acres (0.81 km^{2}) of derelict land (now mostly replaced with housing). The Angel of the North, a famous sculpture in nearby Lamesley, is visible from the A1 to the south of Gateshead, as well as from the East Coast Main Line. Other public art include works by Richard Deacon, Colin Rose, Sally Matthews, Andy Goldsworthy, Gordon Young and Michael Winstone.

=== Traditional and former ===
The earliest recorded coal mining in the Gateshead area is dated to 1344. As trade on the Tyne prospered there were several attempts by the burghers of Newcastle to annexe Gateshead. In 1576 a small group of Newcastle merchants acquired the 'Grand Lease' of the manors of Gateshead and Whickham. In the hundred years from 1574 coal shipments from Newcastle increased elevenfold while the population of Gateshead doubled to approximately 5,500. However, the lease and the abundant coal supplies ended in 1680. The pits were shallow as problems of ventilation and flooding defeated attempts to mine coal from the deeper seams.

William Cotesworth (1668–1726) was a prominent merchant based in Gateshead, where he was a leader in coal and international trade. Cotesworth began as the son of a yeoman and apprentice to a tallow – candler. He ended as an esquire, having been mayor, Justice of the peace and sheriff of Northumberland. He collected tallow from all over England and sold it across the globe. He imported dyes from the Indies, as well as flax, wine, and grain. He sold tea, sugar, chocolate, and tobacco. He operated the largest coal mines in the area, and was a leading salt producer. As the government's principal agent in the North country, he was in contact with leading ministers.

William Hawks, originally a blacksmith, started business in Gateshead in 1747, with the iron brought to the Tyne as ballast by the Tyne colliers. William Hawks's descendants continued the various companies of the Hawks family, all of which had the name Hawks in the title, that spanned over 44 acres and employed over 2,000 persons during the 19th century, in which they were one of the largest iron businesses in Britain and earned an international reputation. There was keen contemporary rivalry between 'Hawks' Blacks' and 'Crowley's Crew'. The famous 'Hawks' men' including Ned White, went on to be celebrated in Geordie song and story.

In 1831 a locomotive works was established by the Newcastle and Darlington Railway, later part of the York, Newcastle and Berwick Railway. In 1854 the works moved to the Greenesfield site and became the manufacturing headquarters of North Eastern Railway. In 1909, locomotive construction was moved to Darlington and the rest of the works were closed in 1932.

Robert Stirling Newall took out a patent on the manufacture of wire ropes in 1840 and in partnership with Messrs. Liddell and Gordon, set up his headquarters at Gateshead. A worldwide industry of wire-drawing resulted. The submarine telegraph cable received its definitive form through Newall's initiative, involving the use of gutta-percha surrounded by strong wires. The first successful Dover–Calais cable on 25 September 1851, was made in Newall's works. In 1853, he invented the brake-drum and cone for laying cable in deep seas. Half of the first Atlantic cable was manufactured in Gateshead. Newall was interested in astronomy, and his giant 25-inch (640 mm) telescope was set up in the garden at Ferndene, his Gateshead residence, in 1871.

== Architecture ==
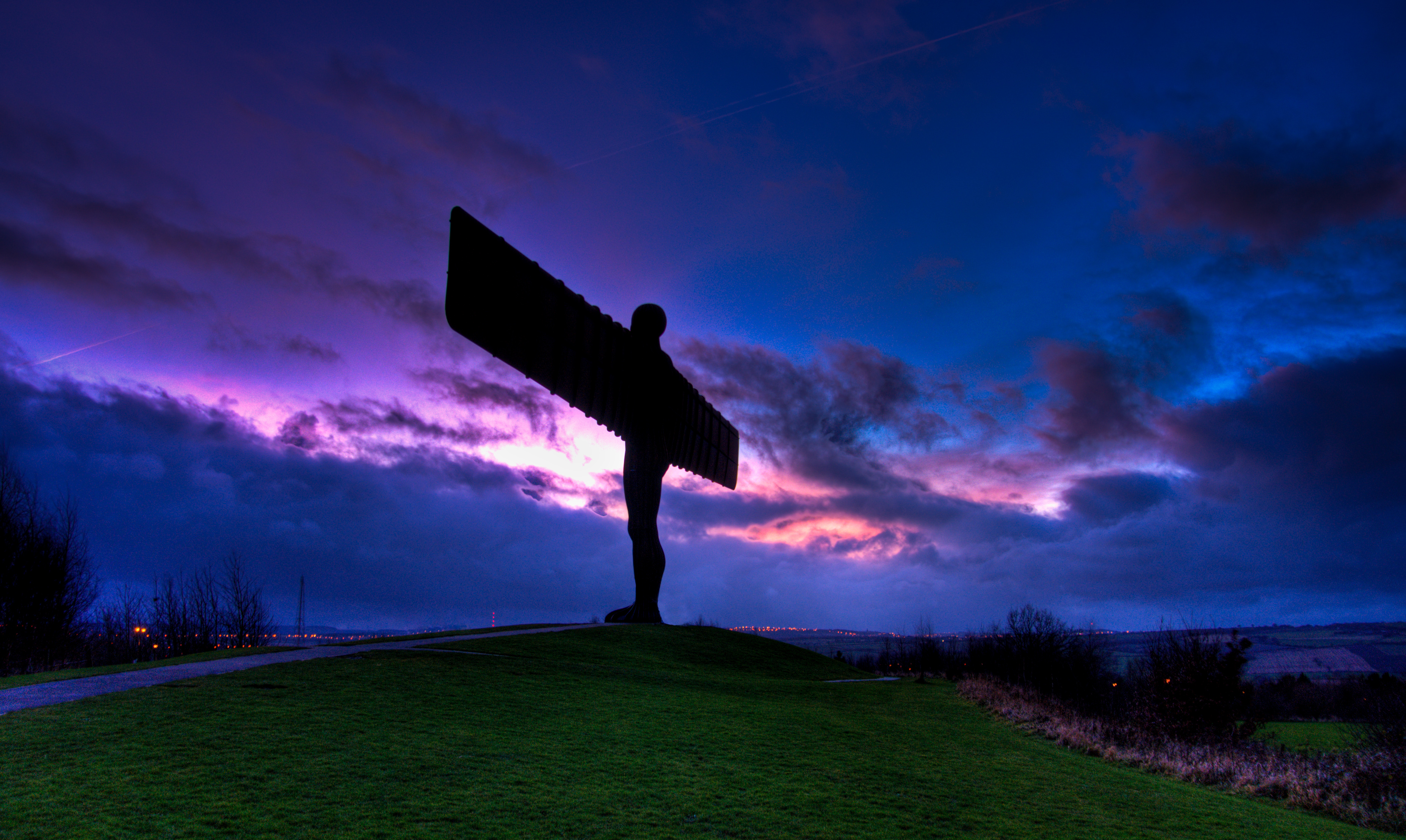
Angel of the North

J. B. Priestley, writing of Gateshead in his 1934 travelogue English Journey, said that "no true civilisation could have produced such a town", adding that it appeared to have been designed "by an enemy of the human race".

=== Victorian ===
Saltwell Towers

William Wailes the celebrated stained-glass maker, lived at South Dene from 1853 to 1860. In 1860, he designed Saltwell Towers as a fairy-tale palace for himself. It is an imposing Victorian mansion in its own park with a romantic skyline of turrets and battlements. It was originally furnished sumptuously by Gerrard Robinson. Some of the panelling installed by Robinson was later moved to the Shipley Art Gallery. Wailes sold Saltwell Towers to the corporation in 1876 for use as a public park, provided he could use the house for the rest of his life. In 1933 Saltwell Towers became home to Gateshead's first museum. The collection was created from donations from citizens and other museums including the Hancock Museum in Newcastle. The building was badly affected by dry rot and damp which was known even before the museum opened. The issue was only ever addressed in a superficial way and consequently the structure deteriorated, with rooms being gradually closed until the decision was made to close entirely in February 1969. Parts of the collection were moved to the Shipley Art Gallery whilst the rest was left in situ. A combination of theft and the deterioration of the building resulted in the loss of many items before the remainder were moved to stores of museums and galleries in the region in 1974. For many years the structure was essentially an empty shell but following a restoration programme it was reopened to the public in 2004.

=== Post millennium ===
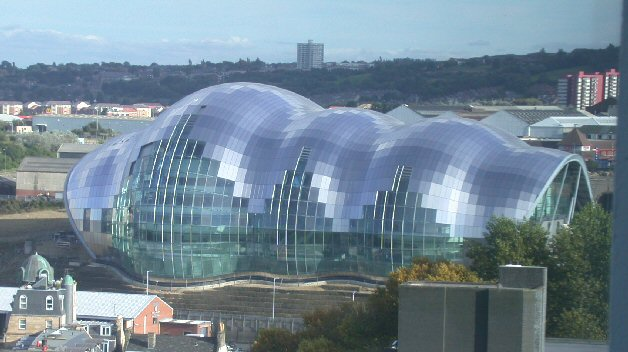
The Glasshouse International Centre for Music

The council sponsored the development of a Gateshead Quays cultural quarter. The development includes the Gateshead Millennium Bridge, erected in 2001, which won the prestigious Stirling Prize for Architecture in 2002.

=== Former brutalism ===
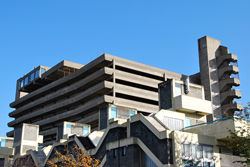
Trinity Centre Car Park in Gateshead town centre, as seen in the film Get Carter (since demolished)

The brutalist Trinity Centre Car Park, which was designed by Owen Luder, dominated the town centre for many years until its demolition in 2010. A product of attempts to regenerate the area in the 1960s, the car park gained an iconic status due to its appearance in the 1971 film Get Carter, starring Michael Caine. An unsuccessful campaign to have the structure listed was backed by Sylvester Stallone, who played the main role in the 2000 remake of the film. The car park was scheduled for demolition in 2009, but this was delayed as a result of a disagreement between Tesco, who re-developed the site, and Gateshead Council. The council had not been given firm assurances that Tesco would build the previously envisioned town centre development which was to include a Tesco mega-store as well as shops, restaurants, cafes, bars, offices and student accommodation. The council effectively used the car park as a bargaining tool to ensure that the company adhered to the original proposals and blocked its demolition until they submitted a suitable planning application. Demolition finally took place in July–August 2010.

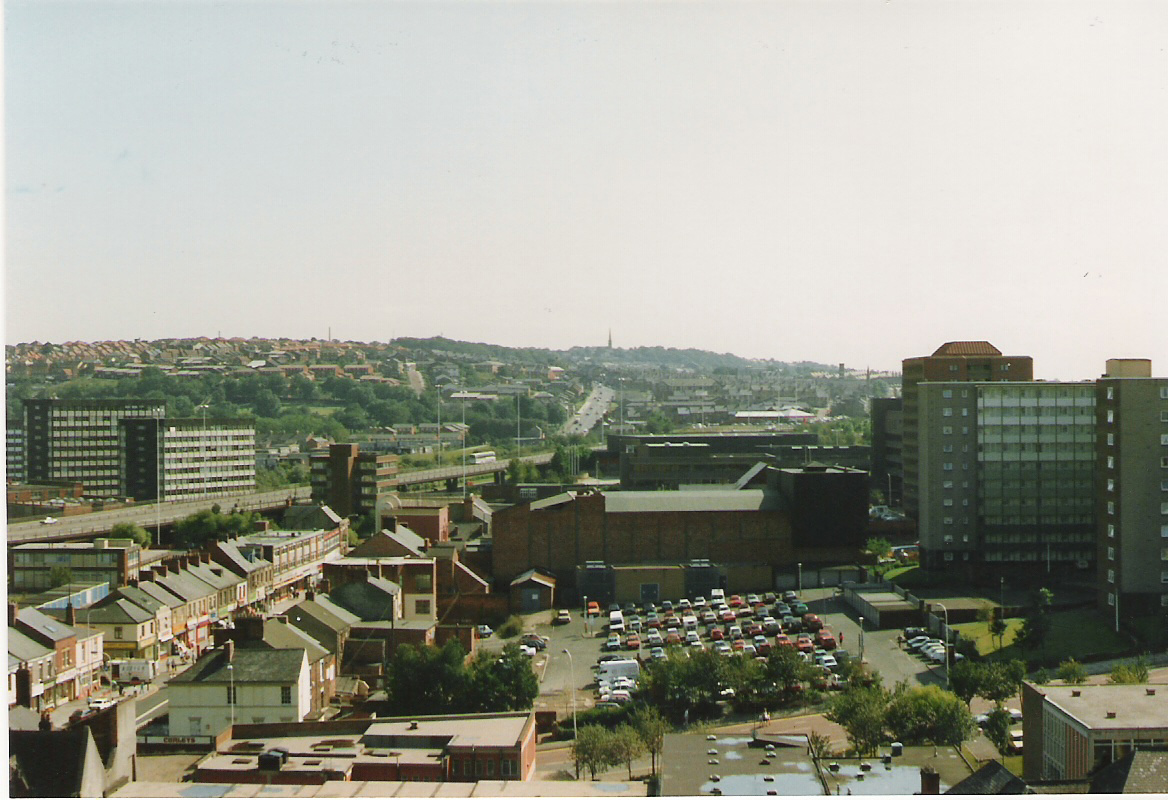
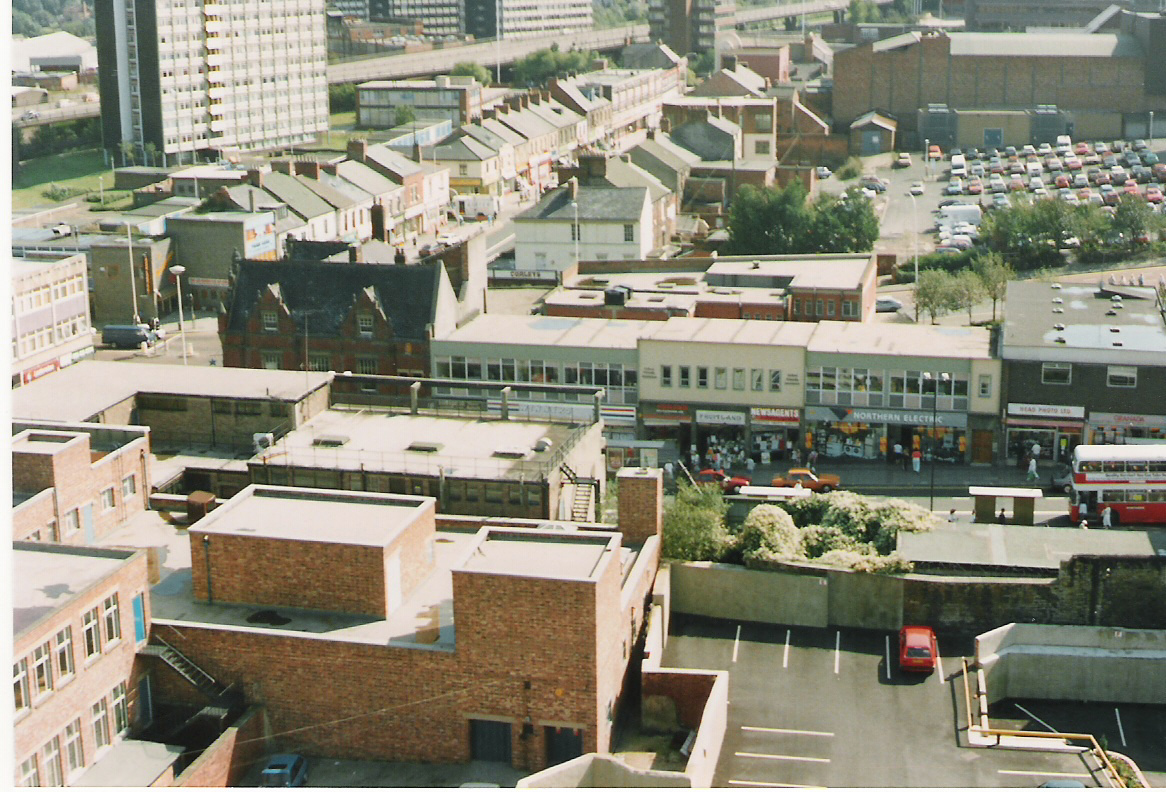
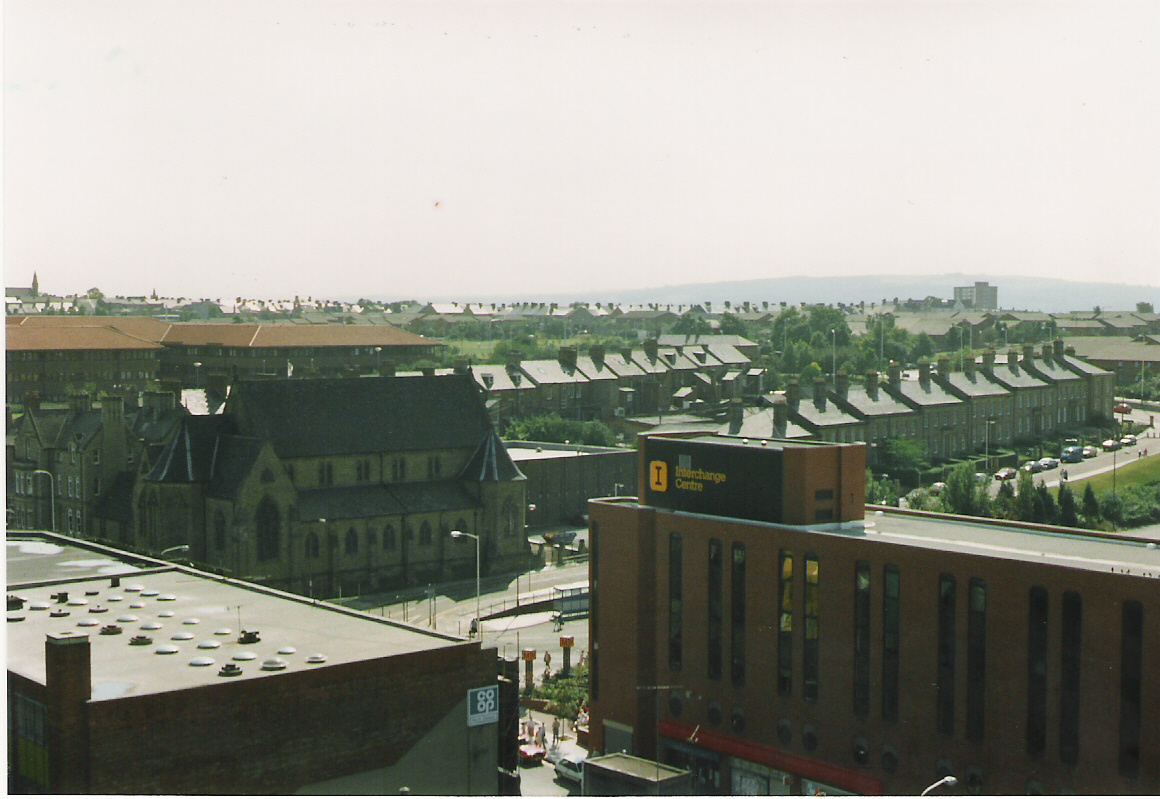
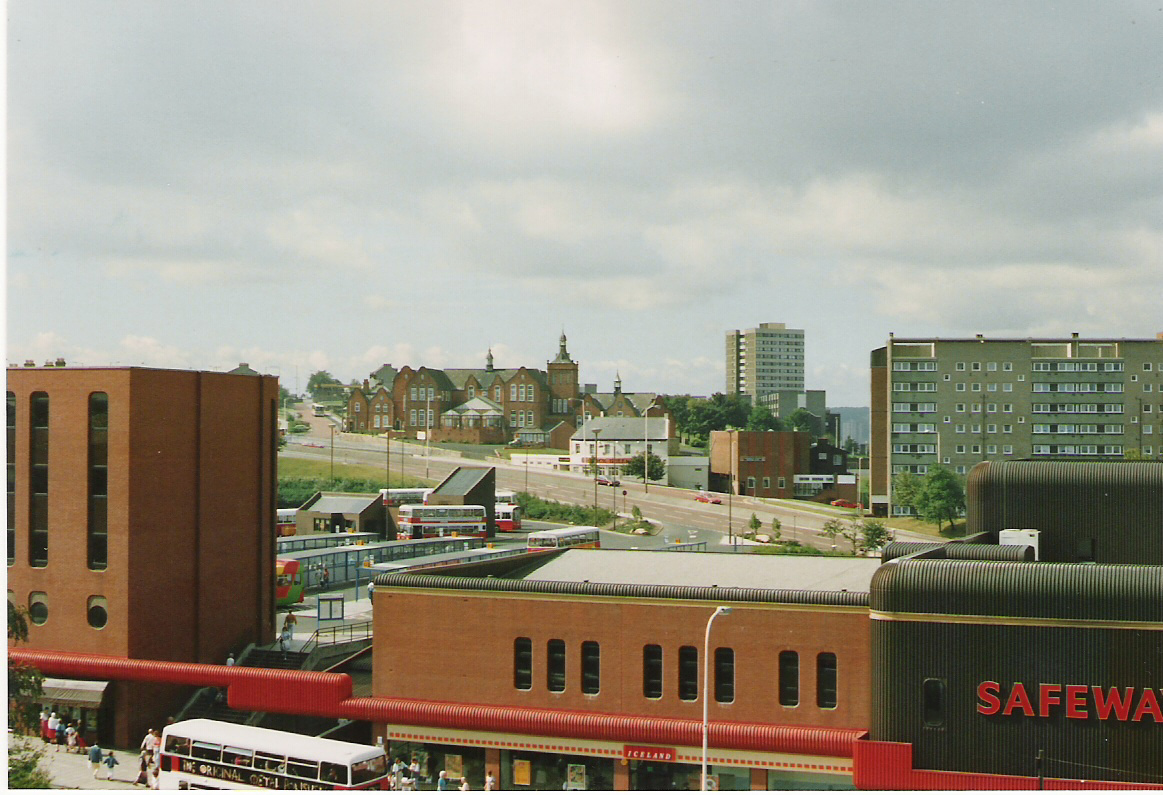
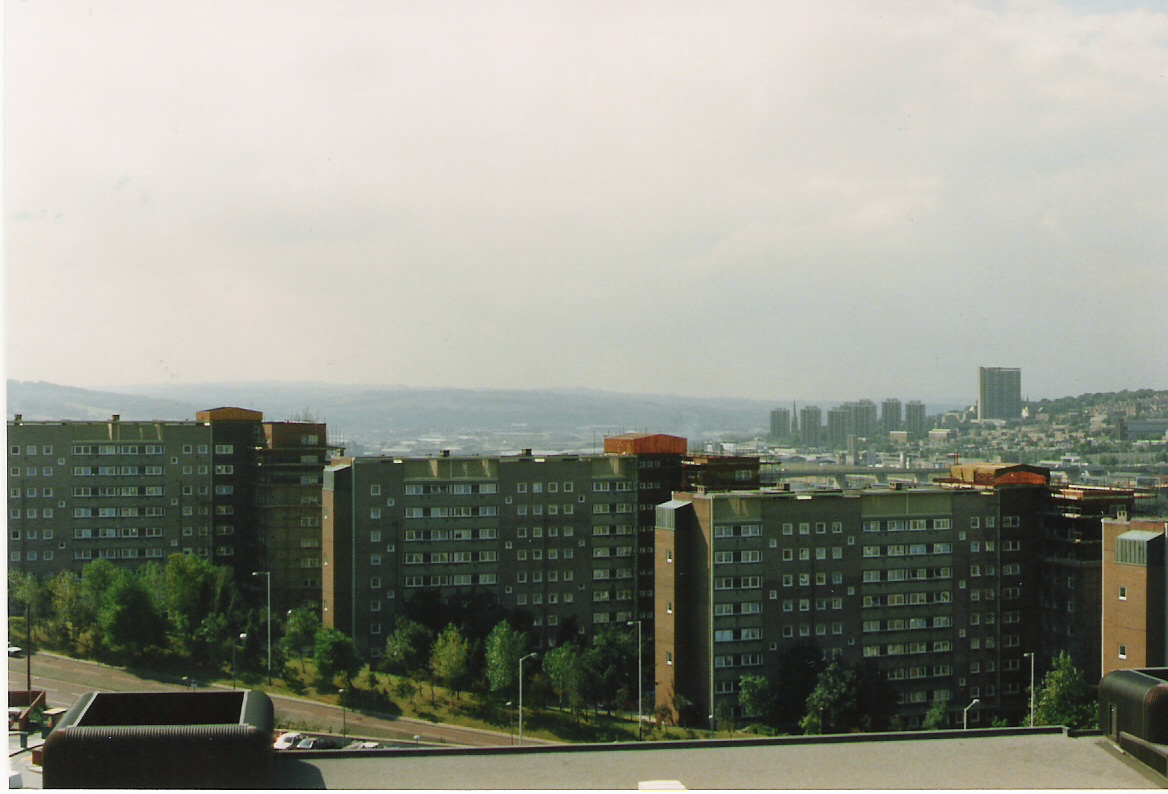
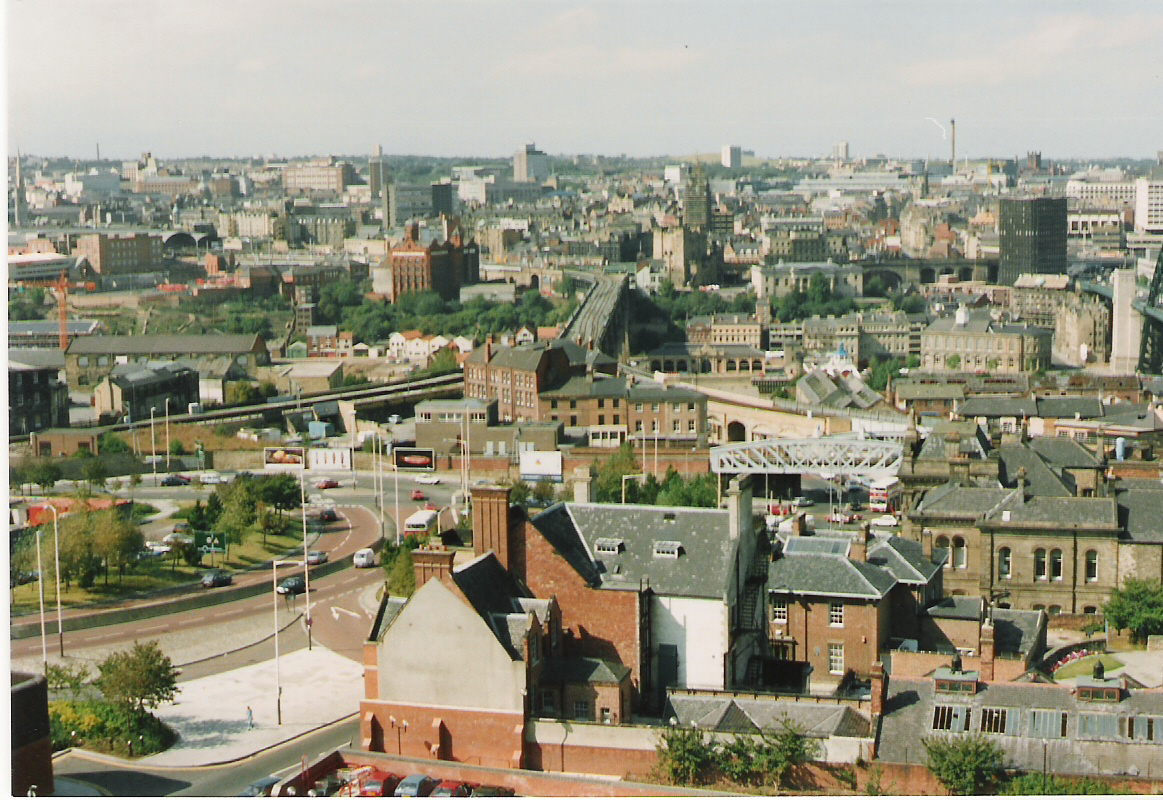
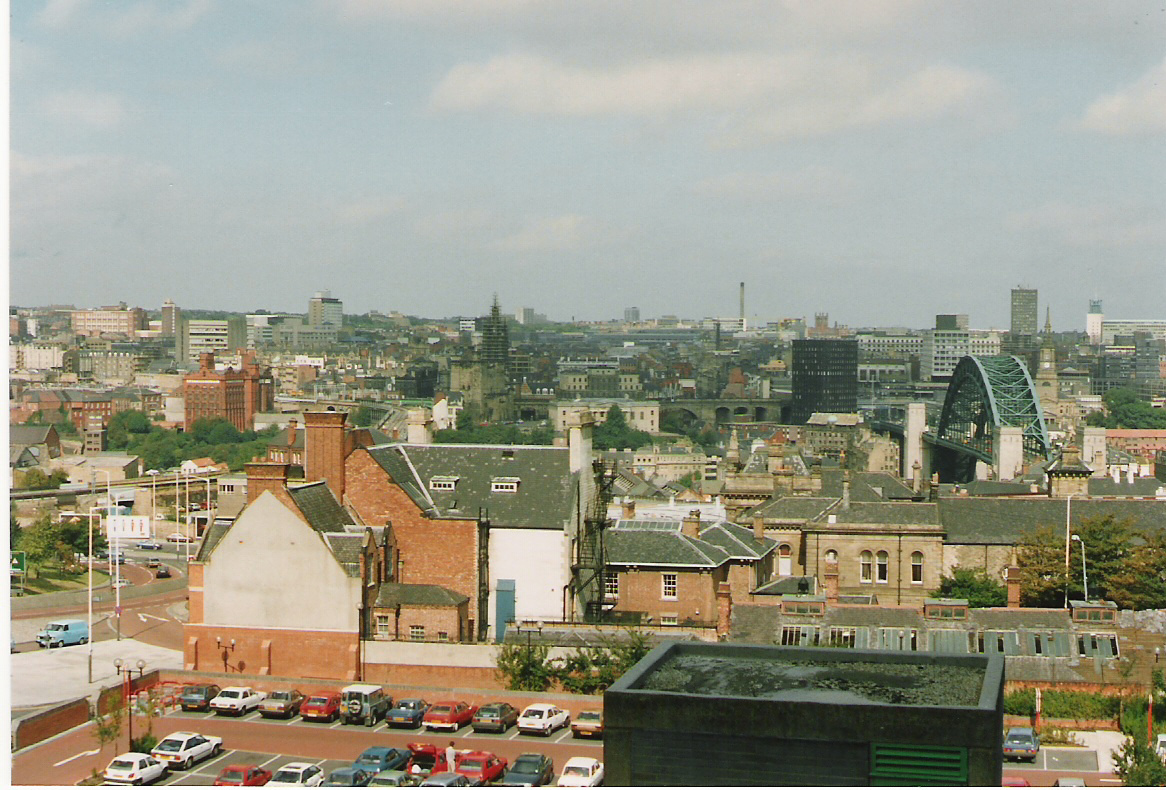
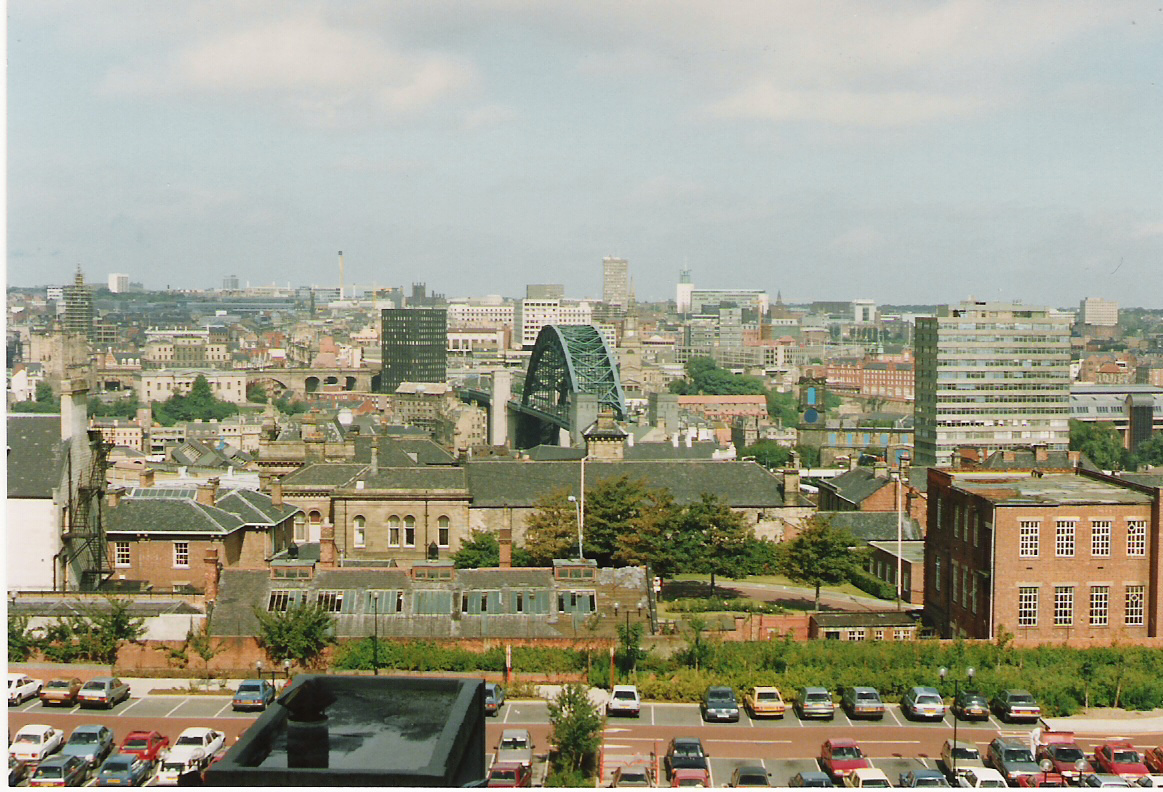
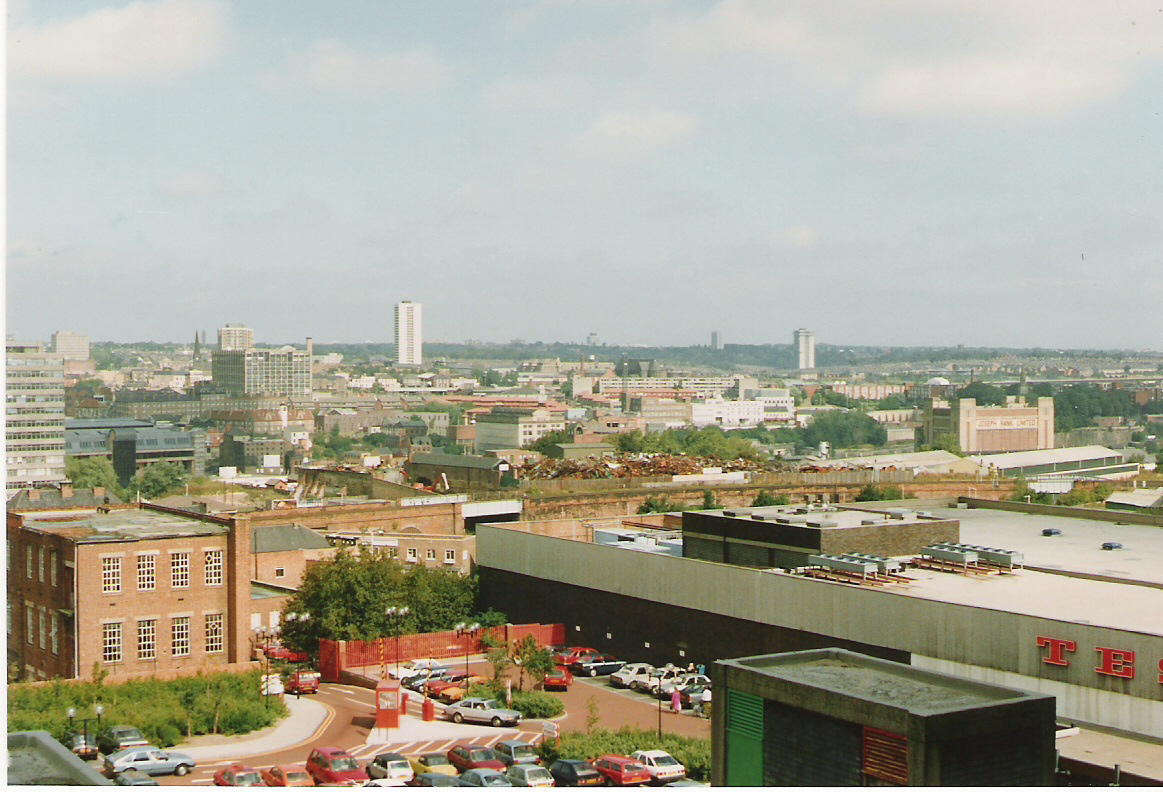
A series of views running clockwise South to North East from Old Trinity Centre Car Park in 1990

The Derwent Tower, another well known example of brutalist architecture, was also designed by Owen Luder and stood in the neighbourhood of Dunston. Like the Trinity Car Park it also failed in its bid to become a listed building and was demolished in 2012. Also located in this area are the Grade II listed Dunston Staiths which were built in 1890. Following the award of a Heritage Lottery Fund grant of almost £420,000 restoration of the structure was planned in 2014 and completed by 2015.

== Sport ==
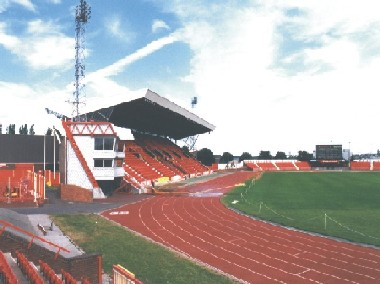
Gateshead International Stadium

Gateshead International Stadium is home of the Gateshead Harriers athletics club and Gateshead Football Club and regularly holds international athletics meetings over the summer months. The stadium, from 1999 to 2014 was also home to Gateshead Thunder rugby league football club until it was purchased by Newcastle Rugby Limited and moved to Kingston Park and rebranded as Newcastle Thunder. Both clubs have had their problems: Gateshead A.F.C. were controversially voted out of the Football League in 1960 in favour of Peterborough United, whilst the original Gateshead Thunder lost their place in Super League as a result of a takeover (officially termed a merger) by Hull F.C.. Both Gateshead clubs continue to ply their trade at lower levels in their respective sports, thanks mainly to the efforts of their supporters. The Gateshead Senators American football team also use the International Stadium, as well as this it was used in the 2006 Northern Conference champions in the British American Football League.

The stadium first hosted rugby league in 1934 with an England vs Australia non-test international, thought did not host another major rugby league event until it hosted Charity Shield matches in the 1990s and a match between Australia and South Africa at the 1995 Rugby League World Cup.

Gateshead Leisure Centre is home to the Gateshead Phoenix Basketball Team. The team currently plays in EBL League Division 4. Home games are usually on a Sunday afternoon during the season, which runs from September to March. The team was formed in 2013 and ended their initial season well placed to progress after defeating local rivals Newcastle Eagles II and promotion chasing Kingston Panthers.

In Low Fell there is a cricket club and a rugby club adjacent to each other on Eastwood Gardens. These are Gateshead Fell Cricket Club and Gateshead Rugby Club. Gateshead Rugby Club was formed in 1998 following the merger of Gateshead Fell Rugby Club and North Durham Rugby Club.

== Transport ==
=== Rail ===
Gateshead is served by the following rail transport stations with some being operated by National Rail and some being Tyne & Wear Metro stations: Dunston, Felling, Gateshead Interchange, Gateshead Stadium, Heworth Interchange, MetroCentre and Pelaw.

Tyne & Wear Metro stations at Gateshead Interchange and Gateshead Stadium provide direct light-rail access to Newcastle, Newcastle Airport, Sunderland, Tynemouth and South Shields Interchange.

National Rail services are provided by Northern at Dunston and MetroCentre stations. The East Coast Main Line, which runs from London Kings Cross to Edinburgh Waverley, cuts directly through the town on its way between Newcastle and Chester-le-Street stations. There are presently no stations on this line within Gateshead, as Low Fell, Bensham and Gateshead West stations were closed in 1952, 1954 and 1965 respectively.

=== Road ===
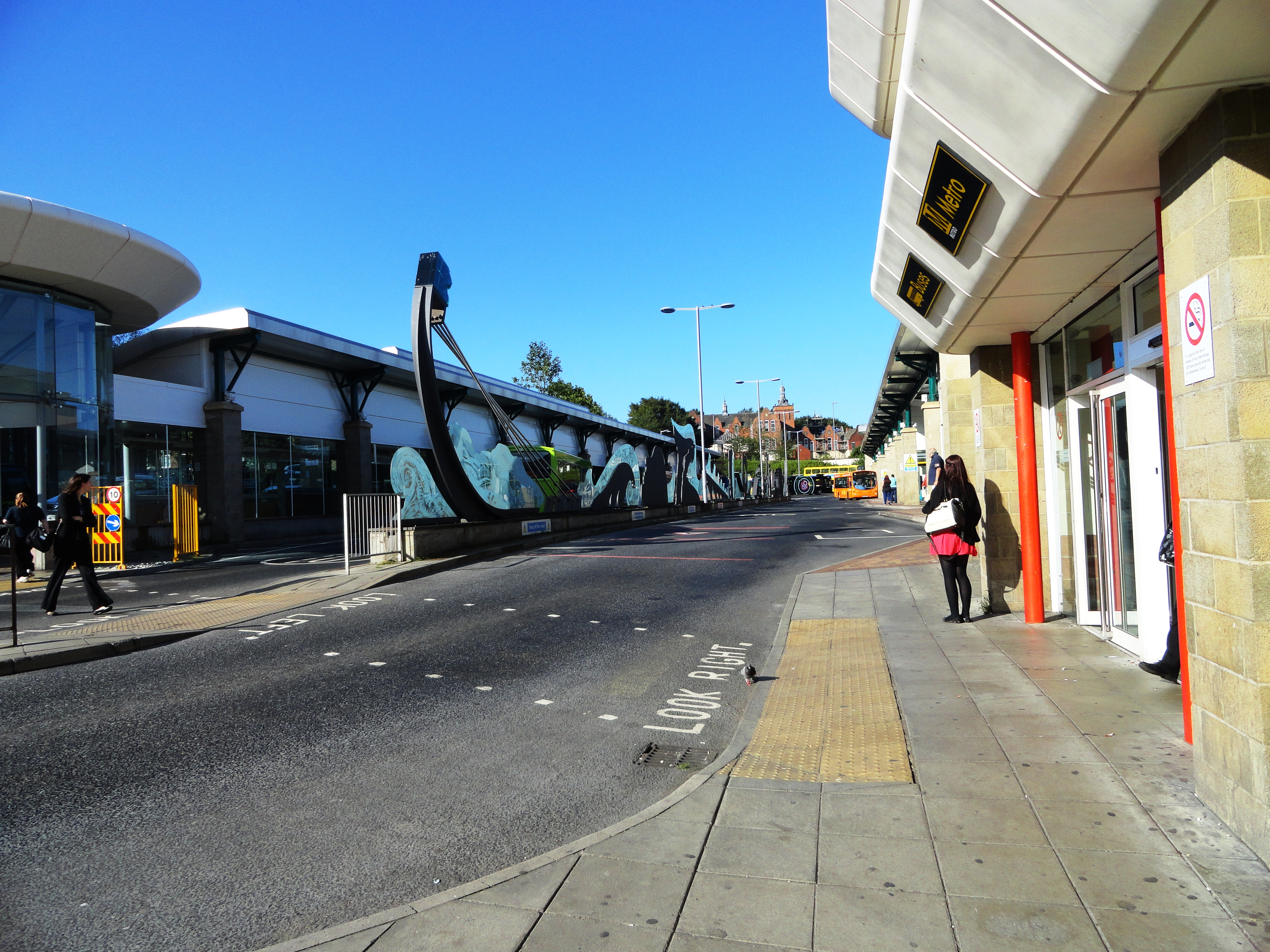
South side of Gateshead Interchange

Several major road links pass through Gateshead, including the A1 which links London to Edinburgh and the A184 which connects the town to Sunderland.

Gateshead Interchange is the busiest bus station in Tyne & Wear and was used by 3.9 million bus passengers in 2008.

=== Cycle routes ===
Various bicycle trails traverse the town; most notably is the recreational Keelmans Way (National Cycle Route 141), which is located on the south bank of the Tyne and takes riders along the entire Gateshead foreshore. Other prominent routes include the East Gateshead Cycleway, which connects to Felling, the West Gateshead Cycleway, which links the town centre to Dunston and the MetroCentre, and routes along both the old and new Durham roads, which take cyclists to Birtley, Wrekenton and the Angel of the North.

== Religion ==
=== Christianity ===
Christianity has been present in the town since at least the 7th century, when Bede mentioned a monastery in Gateshead. In 1080, a church near the site of the current St Mary's Church was burned down by an angry mob with the Bishop of Durham inside. St Mary's Church was built near to the site of that building, and was the only church in the town until the 1820s. In 1979, the church was damaged by fire and subsequently restored. Undoubtedly the oldest building on the Quayside, St Mary's has now re-opened to the public as the town's first heritage centre.

Many of the Anglican churches in the town date from the 19th century, when the population of the town grew dramatically and expanded into new areas. The town presently has a number of notable and large churches of many denominations.

=== Judaism ===
The Bensham district is home to a community of hundreds of Orthodox Jewish families and has been referred to as the Oxbridge of British Jewry. Within the community is the Gateshead Yeshiva, founded in 1929, and other Jewish educational institutions with international enrolments. These include two seminaries: Beis Medrash L'Morot and Beis Chaya Rochel, colloquially known together as Gateshead "old" and "new" seminaries. Many yeshivos and kollelim also are active, including Sunderland Yeshiva, Baer Hatorah, Nesivos Hatorah, Nezer Hatorah and Yeshiva Ketana.

=== Islam ===
Islam is practised by a large community of people in Gateshead and there are 2 mosques located in the Bensham area (in Ely Street and Villa Place).

== Twinning ==
Gateshead is twinned with the town of Saint-Étienne-du-Rouvray near Rouen in France, and the city of Komatsu in Japan.

== Notable people ==
- Eliezer Adler – founder of Jewish Community
- Marcus Bentley – narrator of Big Brother
- Catherine Booth – wife of William Booth, known as the Mother of The Salvation Army
- William Booth – founder of the Salvation Army
- Mary Bowes – the Unhappy Countess, author and celebrity
- Ian Branfoot – footballer and manager (Sheffield Wednesday and Southampton)
- Andy Carroll – footballer (Newcastle United, Liverpool and West Ham United)
- Frank Clark – footballer and manager (Newcastle United and Nottingham Forest)
- David Clelland – Labour politician and MP
- Derek Conway – former Conservative politician and MP
- Joseph Cowen – Radical politician
- Steve Cram – athlete (middle-distance runner)
- Emily Davies – educational reformer and feminist, founder of Girton College, Cambridge
- Daniel Defoe – writer and government agent
- Ruth Dodds – politician, writer and co-founder of the Little Theatre
- Jonathan Edwards – athlete (triple jumper) and television presenter
- Sammy Johnson – actor (Spender)
- George Elliot – industrialist and MP
- Pesach Eliyahu Falk – rabbi
- Paul Gascoigne – footballer (Newcastle United, Tottenham Hotspur, Lazio, Rangers and Middlesbrough)
- Alex Glasgow – singer-songwriter
- Avrohom Gurwicz – rabbi, Dean of Gateshead Yeshiva
- Leib Gurwicz – rabbi, Dean of Gateshead Yeshiva
- Jill Halfpenny – actress (Coronation Street and EastEnders)
- Chelsea Halfpenny – actress (Emmerdale)
- Several members of the Hawks family - 19th century industrialist dynasty responsible for much development of Gateshead.
- David Hodgson – footballer and manager (Middlesbrough, Liverpool and Sunderland)
- Sharon Hodgson – Labour politician and MP
- Norman Hunter – footballer (Leeds United and member of 1966 World Cup-winning England squad)
- Don Hutchison – footballer (Liverpool, West Ham United, Everton and Sunderland)
- Brian Johnson – AC/DC frontman
- Tommy Johnson – footballer (Aston Villa and Celtic)
- Riley Jones – actor
- Howard Kendall – footballer and manager (Preston North End and Everton)
- J. Thomas Looney – Shakespeare scholar
- Gary Madine – footballer (Sheffield Wednesday)
- Justin McDonald – actor (Distant Shores)
- Lawrie McMenemy – football manager (Southampton and Northern Ireland) and pundit
- Thomas Mein – professional cyclist (Canyon DHB p/b Soreen)
- Robert Stirling Newall – industrialist
- David Olusoga - Historian and Broadcaster
- Bezalel Rakow – communal rabbi
- John William Rayner – flying ace and war hero
- James Renforth – oarsman
- Mariam Rezaei – musician and artist
- Sir Tom Shakespeare – baronet, sociologist and disability rights campaigner
- William Shield – Master of the King's Musick
- Christina Stead – Australian novelist
- John Steel – drummer (The Animals)
- Henry Spencer Stephenson – chaplain to King George VI and Queen Elizabeth II
- Steve Stone – footballer (Nottingham Forest, Aston Villa and Portsmouth)
- Chris Swailes – footballer (Ipswich Town)
- Sir Joseph Swan – inventor of the incandescent light bulb
- Nicholas Trainor – cricketer (Gloucestershire)
- Chris Waddle – footballer (Newcastle United, Tottenham Hotspur and Sheffield Wednesday)
- William Wailes – stained glass maker
- Taylor Wane – adult entertainer
- Robert Spence Watson – public benefactor
- Sylvia Waugh – author of The Mennyms series for children
- Chris Wilkie – guitarist (Dubstar)
- John Wilson – orchestral conductor
- Peter Wilson – footballer (Gateshead, captain of Australia)
- Thomas Wilson – poet/school founder
- Robert Wood – Australian politician

== See also ==
- Little Theatre Gateshead
- Gateshead Central and Whickham (UK Parliament constituency)

== Sources ==
- Dougan, David (1968). The History of North East Shipbuilding. London: George Allen & Unwin.
- Grundy, John (2022). History of Northumberland. Newcastle upon Tyne: Tyne Bridge Publishing. ISBN 9781838280970.
- Smailes, AE (1960). North England. Edinburgh: Thomas Nelson & Sons Ltd.
- Webb, Jonathan CK (2009). Tyneside from the Air. Derby: Breedon Books Publishing Co Ltd. ISBN 9781 85983 683 5.
