= Trinity Square, Gateshead =

Shopping quarter in Gateshead, Tyne and Wear, England

Coordinates: 54.9627°N 1.6022°W

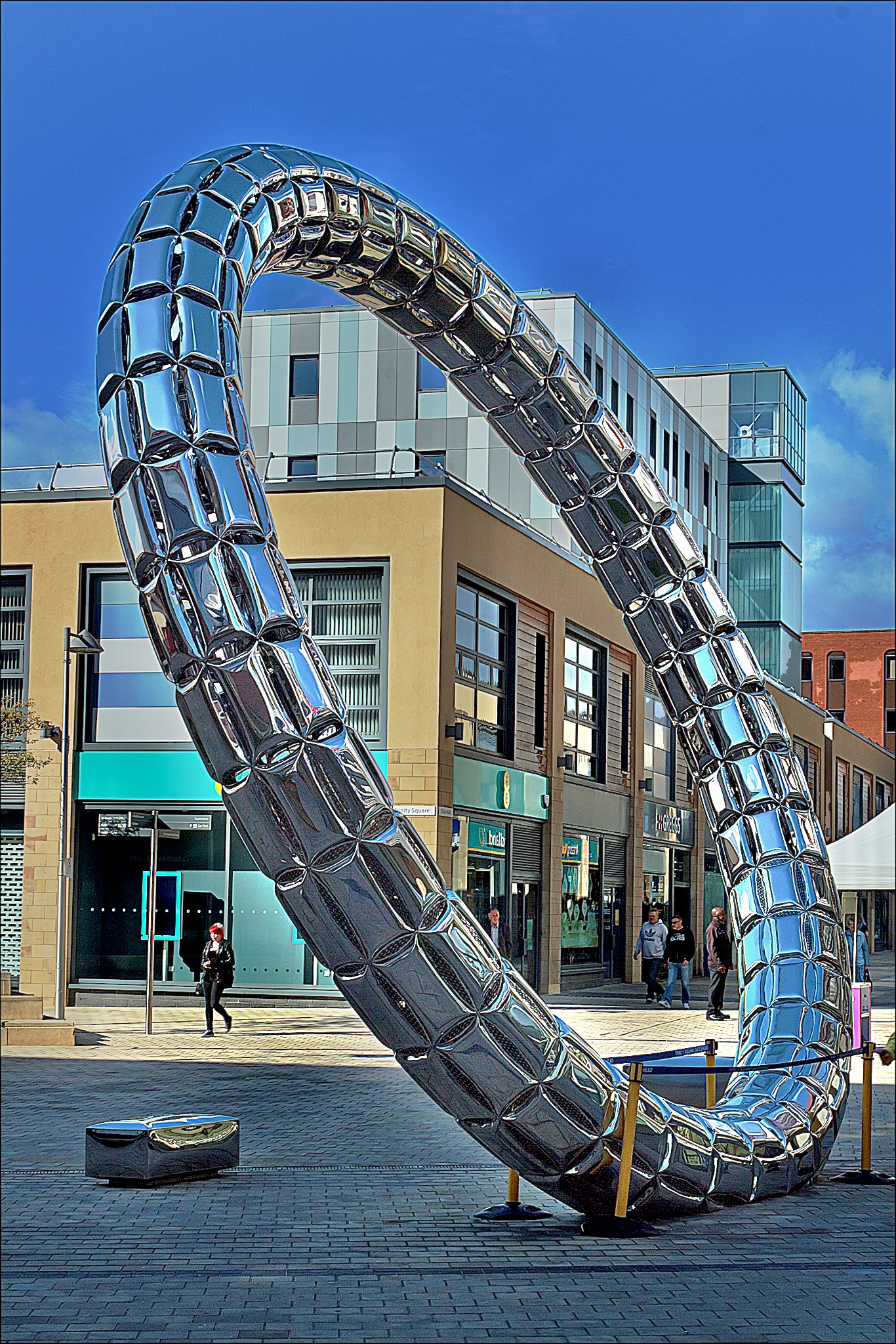
Sculpture in the square's centre

Trinity Square is a shopping and leisure centre in Gateshead, Tyne and Wear, England. The new centre was constructed on the site of a former multi-storey car park and shopping complex going by the same name, which originally opened in 1967.

The former Trinity Square was noted for its Brutalist architecture produced by Rodney Gordon when he worked for the Owen Luder Partnership. The car park had a prominent role in the 1971 film Get Carter, so is commonly referred to as the Get Carter car park. The demolition of the car park structure itself started on 26 July 2010 and was complete by early October of the same year. The shopping centre opened in 2013.

== Construction ==
The car park was designed in 1962 by the Owen Luder Partnership when Brutalism was regarded as the cutting edge of architecture, but by the time that it opened in 1967, interest in the movement had begun to decline. The building's raw concrete weathered poorly, and by the time Get Carter was filmed in 1970 the car park had already become patchy.

The multi-storey car park had seven tiers of parking decks. These were raised above the adjoining shopping centre by a "forest" of piloti columns. The decks on the north face had a slight curve creating a wave effect. There were two supporting towers containing stair and lift access. Each level of car park was therefore uninterrupted, so that when viewed from a distance the sky was visible through the structure. A cafe unit in a contrasting box structure sat above the top tier of the car park connected to the access towers by a glazed bridge and an open walkway. The cafe, which never actually opened, had large windows providing views across the Tyne Gorge.

The developer was E Alec Colman Investments Ltd, which had also used Luder for its Tricorn Centre in Portsmouth, and construction was undertaken by Robert McAlpine. The consulting structural engineer was Gordon Rose of Rose Associates. The lead architect was Rodney Gordon. The car park was commissioned as part of the redevelopment of the established market square in Gateshead town centre, and hence was sometimes referred to as the Inner Market car park. However the landscaping ultimately created an exposed and unattractive shopping precinct on two levels with poor access. While construction of the car park was in progress subsidence was noticed due to mine workings, but this was overcome. At the same time nearby Newcastle upon Tyne had begun the covered Eldon Square Shopping Centre and this further undermined the long-term success of the development. The rooftop cafe failed to find a tenant and was never opened. It was also unable to be granted a fire certificate by the fire service.

=== Depiction in Get Carter ===
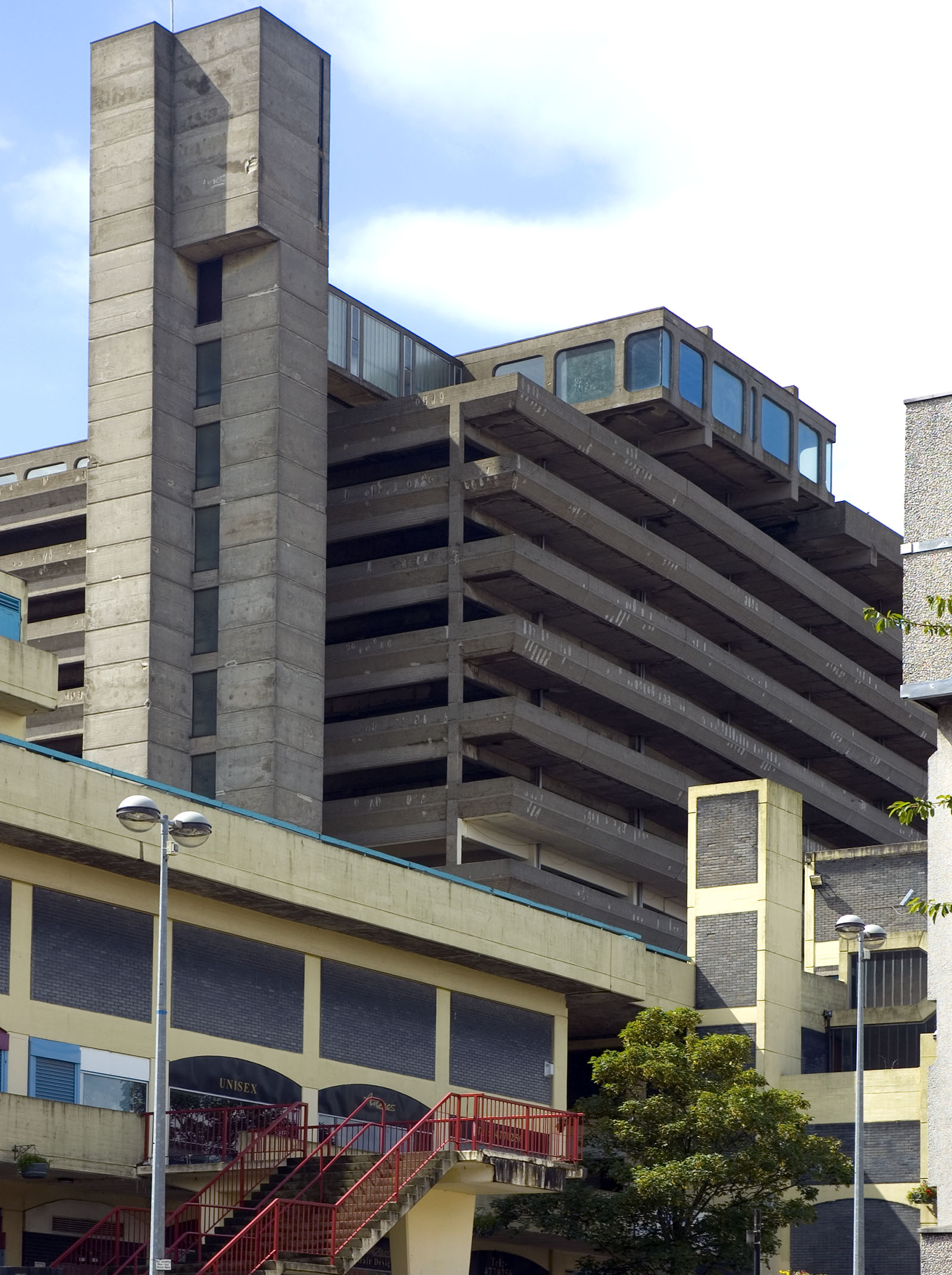
Showing the rooftop cafe

The interior of the car park is the location of several key scenes in Get Carter, and is also often seen in the distance. Local businessman Cliff Brumby (Bryan Mosley) meets Jack Carter (Michael Caine) at the incomplete rooftop café, as he is in the process of developing it into a restaurant. Carter later confronts Brumby on one of the building's stairways, and pushes him off to his death; meanwhile the two effete architects waiting in the unfinished café for Brumby start worrying about ever getting their fees. After this film the car park was dubbed the Get Carter car park because of its appearance in the film. The director Mike Hodges was not aware that his friend Rodney Gordon had designed the car park, and did not understand Gordon's constant joking that one of the architect characters was a send-up of him. It was only through reading Gordon's obituaries that Hodges realised he was serious: "Until then I'd always thought the architect was Owen Luder whereas, in fact, it was his practice that took the credit. My friend, Rodney Gordon, had actually designed the Trinity Centre. He hadn't been joking after all."

=== Other depictions ===
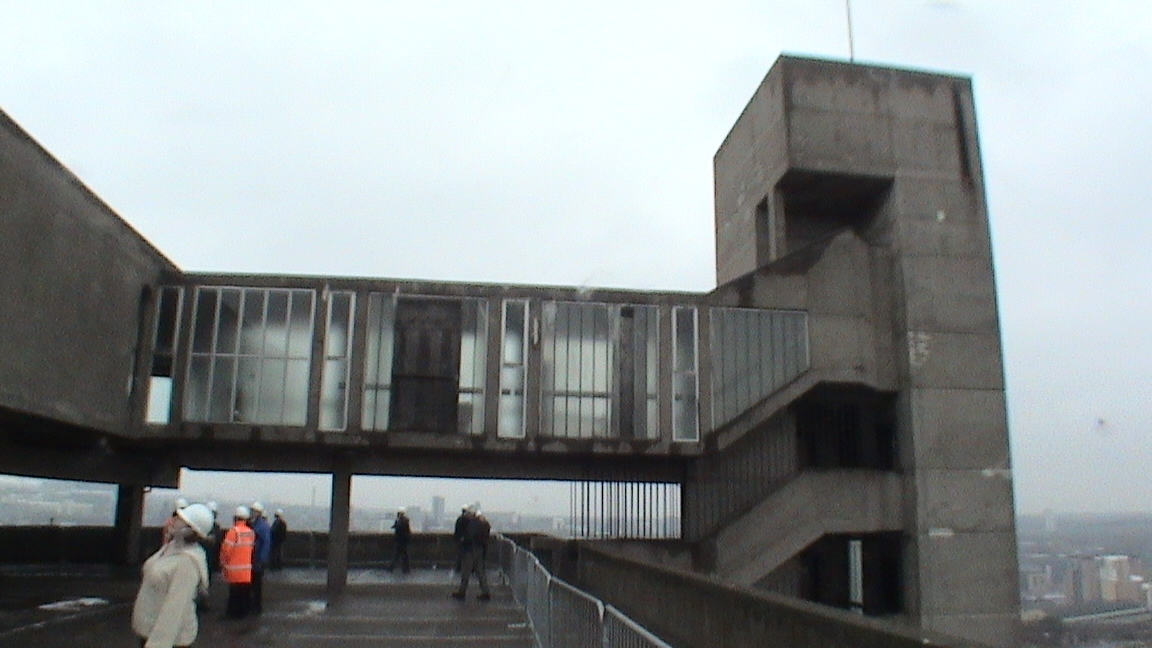
Derelict state of the rooftop restaurant during April 2008 tour

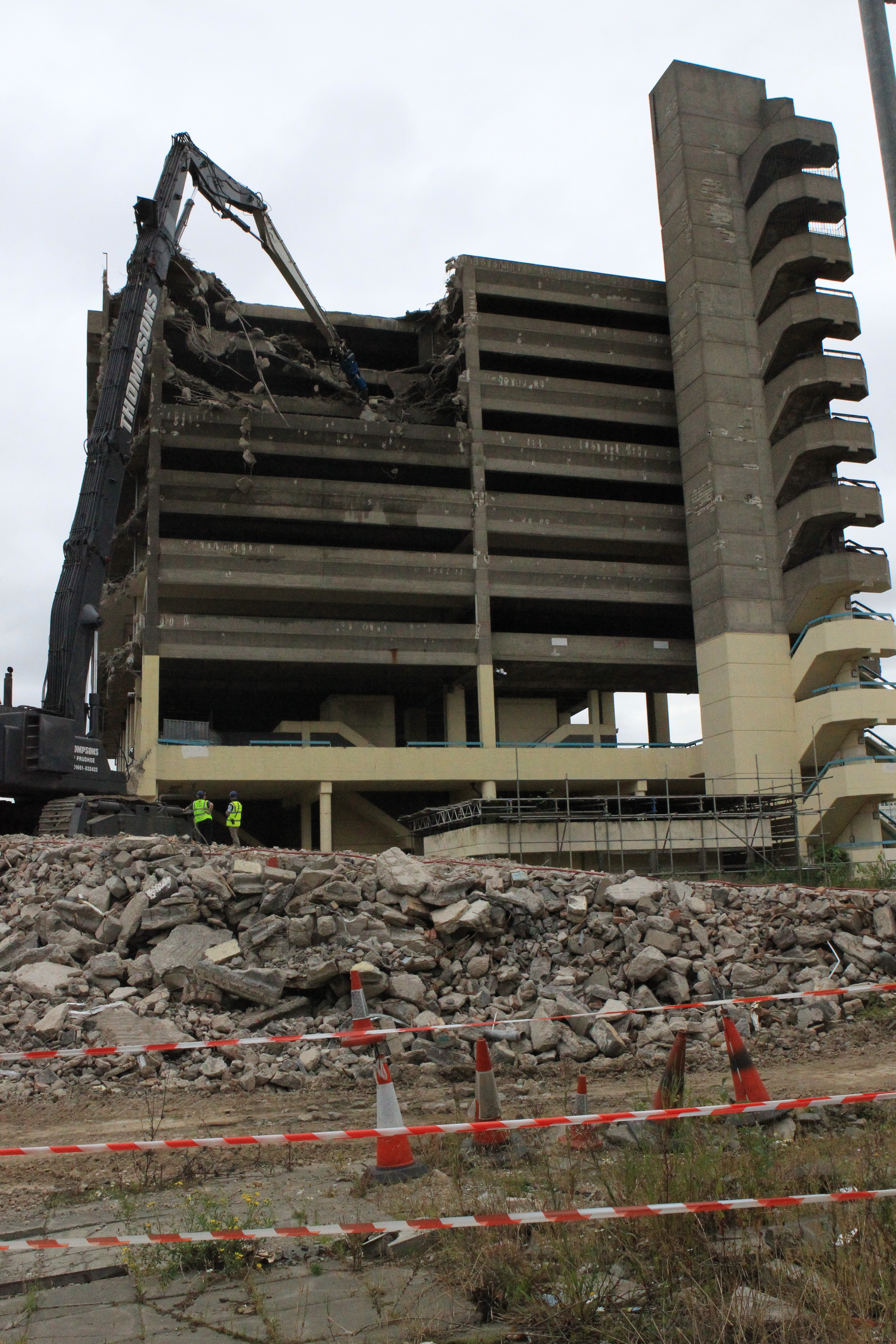
The first day of demolition on the car park structure, on 26 July 2010

In 2005, BBC Radio 3 broadcast Gateshead Multi-Storey Car Park in its experimental Between The Ears slot. A radiophonic tribute to Trinity Square, produced by Langham Research Centre, the programme was made entirely from the sounds of the car park, processed and treated on quarter-inch tape, featuring interviews with its architect Owen Luder, and representatives from the Twentieth Century Society and Gateshead Council.

The car park was the subject of scale (1/16 inch=1 foot), a dual channel super 16 mm film transferred to video, 16 minutes long and made in 2003. The work is by Turner Prize-nominated artist Runa Islam. In the piece the building is compared to its architectural model.

In 1984, Newcastle band Hurrah! shot a video showing the group performing their third single "Who'd Have Thought", which reached number 7 in the UK Indie chart in 1984, at the top of the 15 storey car park.

== Decline ==
With the development of the MetroCentre and competition from nearby Newcastle upon Tyne city centre, commercial interests in Gateshead town centre have declined. The 1985 opening of the Gateshead Interchange, a bus and metro transport hub, combined with changes to town centre access for private motorists, made the car park largely redundant. Its deteriorating condition also led to the 1995 decision to close the upper parking levels. In the late 1990s Tesco acquired an interest in the site and in 2008 work began to redevelop the entire Trinity Square site and the existing Tesco supermarket into a new town centre shopping complex.

=== Preservation attempts ===
During the 1980s and 1990s, there were various proposals to redevelop the car park as a contemporary art gallery or events venue (and in 1983 Charlie Hooker and the Newcastle-based Basement Group organised Mainbeam – a ballet for vehicles there), but as the structure was regarded as a civic white elephant, these all met with local resistance.

The building remained unlisted. The building was featured in the Channel 4 series Demolition in 2005. At the same time general interest in the car park increased, partly as a reflection of the recognition of Get Carter as a classic of British cinema, with Sylvester Stallone lending his weight to the calls for it to be preserved as a cinematic landmark.

=== Demolition ===
In June 2007, Gateshead Council and site owners Tesco confirmed the intended demolition of the car park. The shops in the shopping centre below closed at the end of January 2008, in readiness for the demolition, and a final tour of the upper levels was held by the owners of the site in April 2008. Demolition of the buildings surrounding the car park was started at the end of 2008 by demolition contractor, Thompsons of Prudhoe. By 2010, the car park structure remained, although the shopping centre buildings around had been demolished. Demolition of the car park itself finally commenced on 26 July 2010, with Owen Luder stating that Gateshead would lose its "front teeth".

Gateshead Council sold off fragments of the remains as "commemorative pieces of concrete in specially decorated tins" for £5 each.

== Redevelopment ==
The site was subsequently redeveloped by Spenhill Developments, a division of Tesco, and a large supermarket, which was built by Bowmer + Kirkland, was completed in 2013. Trinity Square was nominated for the 2014 Carbuncle Cup for the ugliest building of the previous 12 months.

== See also ==
- List of Brutalist structures
