= Owen Luder =

British architect (1928–2021)

Owen Luder CBE
- Born: Harold Owen Luder; 7 August 1928; London, England
- Died: 8 October 2021 (aged 93)
- Occupation: Architect
- Practice: Owen Luder Partnership
- Buildings: Tricorn Centre, Portsmouth; Trinity Square, Gateshead

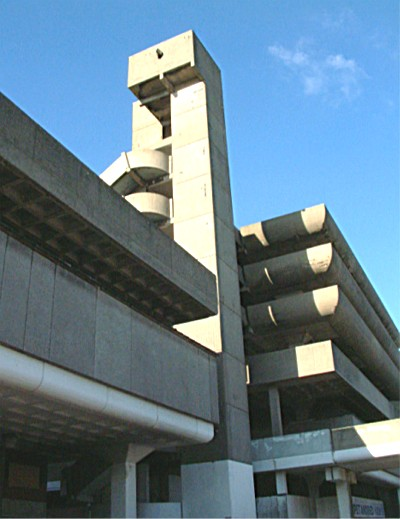
The now-demolished Tricorn Centre in Portsmouth. It was described by Prince Charles as "a mildewed lump of elephant droppings".

Harold Owen Luder CBE (7 August 1928 – 8 October 2021) was a British architect who designed a number of notable and sometimes controversial buildings in the United Kingdom in the 1960s and 1970s, many in an uncompromising brutalist design, and many now demolished. He served as chairman of the Architects Registration Board and twice as President of the Royal Institute of British Architects (RIBA) in 1981–1983 and 1995–1997. He established his own practice Owen Luder Partnership in 1957, and left in 1987 to form the consultancy Communication In Construction.

Luder was president of RIBA when Charles III, then Prince of Wales, attacked what he saw as the ugliness of modernism. Luder told colleagues to ignore him and just say "sod you", leading to some critics of brutalist buildings dubbing them "sod you architecture".

== Early life and career ==
Luder was born in London in 1928, the son of an unknown father and Ellen Clara Mason, who married Edward Charles Luder in 1931. He grew up on the Old Kent Road in south London. As a boy he wanted to design aircraft but after the Second World War decided to become an architect, and trained at the Brixton School of Building. In 1945, he joined the practice of architect Henry C. Smith, before being called up for military service.

In the early and mid-1950s, he worked for several small architectural practices, as well as undertaking private work. He set up his own practice, Owen Luder Partnership, in 1957.

== Works ==
- Hendon Hall Court, London, England (1963)
- Eros House, Catford, Lewisham, London, England (1965)
- Tricorn Centre, Portsmouth, England (1966) – demolished in 2004
- Trinity Square, Gateshead, England (1967) – demolished in 2010
- Consort House, London, England (1970)
- SouthGate Shopping Centre, Bath, England (1971) – demolished in 2007
- Derwent Tower, Gateshead, England (1972) – demolished in 2012
- Catford Shopping Centre, Catford, Lewisham, London, England (1974)
- Milford Towers, Catford, Lewisham, London, England (1974)

Luder's designs included some of the most powerful and raw examples of Brutalist architecture, with massive bare concrete sculptural forms devoid of claddings or decoration – other than their moulded shape and texture. The British climate, with abundant rain and damp winters, is unsuited to such unclad concrete buildings, which rapidly become a shabby grey–brown colour and streaked with marks where rainwater has run down the façades. The difficulty and cost of maintenance has often exacerbated these problems.

Some of the Owen Luder Partnership's (OLP) best known buildings are the Tricorn Centre in Portsmouth, Derwent Tower in Gateshead, and Catford Shopping Centre in London. Trinity Square in Gateshead (whose landmark multi-storey car park and its architecture featured prominently in violent scenes in the cult 1971 gangster film Get Carter and became nicknamed after the film) was another one of the practice's major schemes but, despite its cinematic fame, demolition began in July 2010. Luder also designed the much-derided Southgate shopping centre in Bath, Somerset, which was demolished in 2007 to make way for a new multimillion-pound development.

Despite receiving awards when built, the Tricorn Centre was voted the third ugliest building in Britain and was demolished in 2004 to mixed reactions and protests from an unrepentant Luder. The Trinity Square car park has also been subject to a number of redevelopment proposals and featured in the Channel 4 series Demolition in 2005. Luder was later given a Rubble Club award for having the best building to be demolished during the architect's lifetime.

Luder featured in the 2005 BBC Radio 3 broadcast Gateshead Multi-Storey Car Park. A radiophonic tribute to Trinity Square, produced by Langham Research Centre, the programme was made entirely from the sounds of the car park, processed and treated on quarter-inch tape.

Luder also designed the conversion of a Victorian fire station into the South London Theatre in 1967. In addition he designed a number of small houses in the borough of Lambeth including 26–28 Groveway (1953) and 76–78 Herne Hill Road (1954), one of the latter was occupied by Luder upon completion.

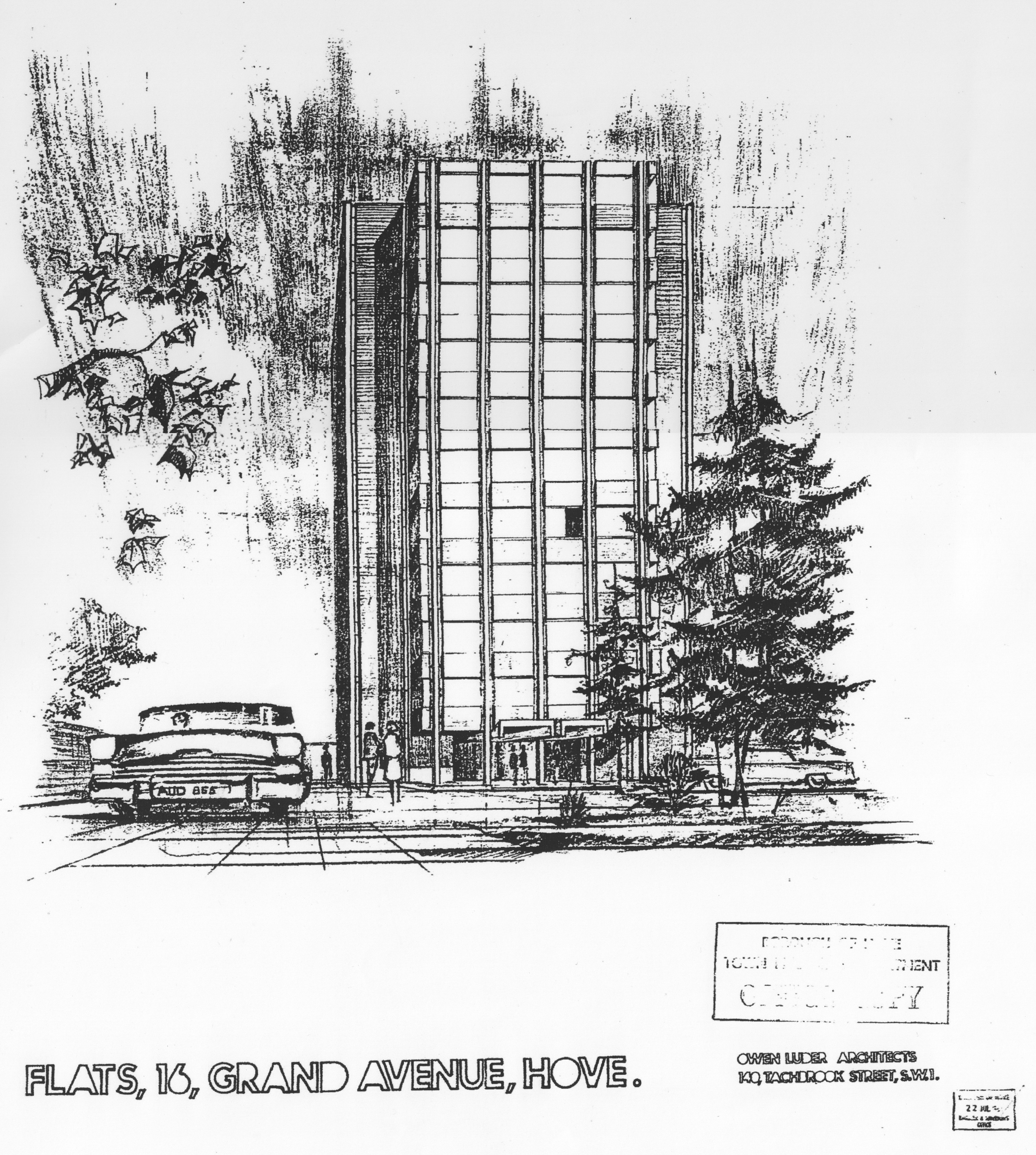
16 Grand Avenue, Hove. Designed by the Owen Luder Partnership in 1965

Some of the less controversial OLP buildings have escaped attention. In their housing and mixed use developments, for example, they display a consistent formal language and many continue to be well used to the present. Examples of these include Harrogate House, Harrogate (1963), Hendon Hall Court in North London (1963), and 16 Grand Avenue in Hove (1965).

The OLP built many buildings around South London, where Luder lived for some time, but also much wider in the UK. The OLP also developed unbuilt schemes for Nigeria, Belgium, Saudi Arabia, and Greece where partnership practices were started.

Trinity Square in Gateshead was demolished in 2010, and Derwent Tower in 2012. The Catford Centre, Luder's last surviving town centre of the Tricorn type, was purchased by the local council in 2010 for "regeneration", which may involve demolition of the housing on the site. Roxby House in Sidcup survives as an example of his later work.

National Life Stories conducted an oral history interview (C467/128) with Owen Luder in 2015-16 for its Architects Lives' collection held by the British Library.

== Death ==
Luder died on 8 October 2021, at the age of 93.

== See also ==
- Rodney Gordon, design director at Owen Luder Partnership.
