= Tricorn Centre =

Former shopping centre in Portsmouth, England

Coordinates: 50°48.155′N 001°05.402′W

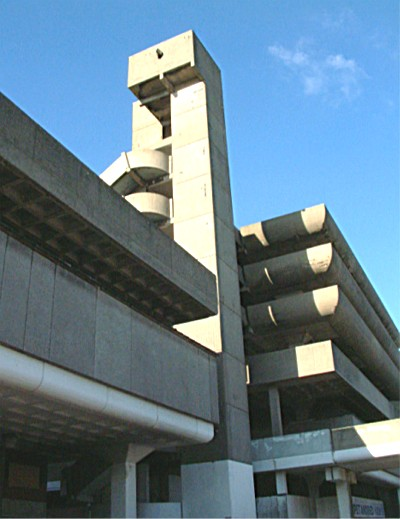
- The Tricorn Centre in the 1980s
- Location: Portsmouth, Hampshire, England
- Address: Commercial Road, Portsmouth PO1
- Opened: 1966
- Closed: March 2002
- Demolished: March 24, 2004–late 2004
- Developer: Alec Colman
- Owner: Portsmouth City Council
- Architect: Owen Luder and Rodney Gordon
- Num. of anchor tenants: 1
- Floors: Multiple levels
- Parking: 400 spaces
- Public transit: Portsmouth & Southsea railway station

The Tricorn Centre was a shopping, nightclub and car park complex in Portsmouth, Hampshire, England. It was designed in the Brutalist style by Owen Luder and Rodney Gordon and took its name from the site's shape which from the air resembled a tricorn hat. Constructed in the mid-1960s, it was demolished in 2004. It was home to one of the first Virgin Megastores and housed the largest Laser Quest arena in Europe.

The centre was a well-known example of 1960s architecture, and in the 1980s it was voted the 3rd ugliest building in the UK. In 2001, BBC Radio 4 listeners voted it the most hated building in the UK, and Charles, Prince of Wales described it as "a mildewed lump of elephant droppings". Demolition of the Tricorn began on 24 March 2004 and took approximately nine months. As of 2026, the site is a ground level car park for the city centre.

== Construction and opening ==
External videos
- Taped Up: The Tricorn (2000). A short documentary film by David Ferrone and Martin Fickling featuring interviews with architect Rodney Gordon (6 mins 2 secs).

Opened in 1966, the centre was an attempt to revitalise Portsmouth, costing the city council £2 million. Originally called 'the Casbah' by its creators, it was deliberately designed with vast amounts of blank surfaces with the expectation that tenants would provide the colour and character via their signage and store frontages. It was hoped that premium stores would occupy the centre but as the centre was not connected to Portsmouth Town Centre, these stores never moved in. Instead the units were let to smaller stores. As well as small traders, tenants included a supermarket and two pubs. In 1967 the site received a commendation from the Civic Trust.

== Businesses in the Tricorn ==
With the failure of a large store to move in, most of the shops were small traders of various types, including market traders with a range of stalls. There was also a Fine Fare supermarket. The council succeeded in getting the fruit and veg market to move from Commercial Road but there were soon complaints. Conditions were found to be dark, damp and poorly ventilated. Access was also a problem with lorries finding it difficult to get to the market via the spiral ramps.

=== Pubs ===
Two pubs – The Casbah and The Golden Bell – were located inside the Tricorn Centre. They were officially opened on 31 August 1966. There was also a club for live music – originally named the Tricorn Club, later renamed Granny's and subsequently Basins – which hosted live performances by Marc Bolan, Slade, Mud, The Sweet, Status Quo, Mary Wells, Edwin Starr, 10,000 Maniacs, and Vinegar Joe, as well as local acts.

=== Flats ===
The centre included eight flats. While initially popular with some residents, the flats suffered from poorly constructed roofs and leaking walls. Only one tenant was left by March 1979 and the flats were later boarded up.

== Demolition ==
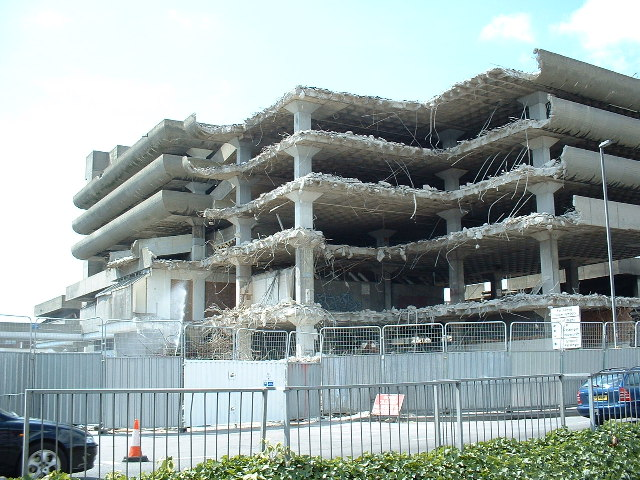
Demolition of the Tricorn Centre, July 2004

A remaining section of the original structure is attached to the building currently housing the Commercial Road Argos store

During the 1980s, the centre became increasingly seedy and the nightclub was developed into a casino. The shops slowly left, with the last ones departing in March 2002. The centre's car park was also the scene of many suicide attempts, being amongst the tallest publicly accessible buildings on the south coast. For this reason, a plaque offering support from The Samaritans was positioned at this infamous point.

Numerous attempts to get the building listed as amongst the best examples of Brutalist architecture failed throughout the 1990s, and neglect, in addition to Portsmouth's wet coastal climate, caused the building to fall beyond the scope of easy repair. Structural steel within the concrete began to rust causing expansion of the concrete, and in some sections, small stalactites began to grow off ledges. Portsmouth City Council deliberated the demolition of the centre for many years; however, the uniquely designed car-parking block, which provided 400 parking spaces, was too useful for the city to destroy until 2004. The site is now occupied by a ground-level open-air car park.

Opponents of demolition argued that the structure, while sadly undermaintained, was still salvageable with the work of ingenious designers and a long-term city plan. Essayist Jonathan Meades commented: "You don't go knocking down Stonehenge or Lincoln Cathedral. I think buildings like the Tricorn were as good as that. They were great monuments of an age." However, government and public opinion was that the building had decayed too far and had attracted such a bad reputation that the only option was to replace it.

The Tricorn was the subject of such strength and diversity of public feeling that opinion boards were placed around its boarding for the public to write on.

== See also ==
- List of Brutalist structures
