= List of schools in Gateshead =

This is a list of schools in the Metropolitan Borough of Gateshead in Tyne and Wear, England.

== State-funded schools ==
=== Primary schools ===
- Barley Mow Primary School, Birtley
- Bede Community Primary School, Gateshead
- Bill Quay Primary School, Bill Quay
- Birtley East Community Primary School, Birtley
- Blaydon West Primary School, Blaydon
- Brandling Primary School, Felling
- Brighton Avenue Primary School, Gateshead
- Caedmon Community Primary School, Gateshead
- Carr Hill Community Primary School, Gateshead
- Chopwell Primary School, Chopwell
- Clover Hill Community Primary School, Whickham
- Colegate Community Primary School, Gateshead
- Corpus Christi Catholic Primary School, Gateshead
- Crookhill Community Primary School, Ryton
- The Drive Community Primary School, Felling
- Dunston Hill Community Primary School, Dunston
- Emmaville Primary School, Crawcrook
- Eslington Primary School, Gateshead
- Falla Park Community Primary School, Gateshead
- Fell Dyke Community Primary School, Gateshead
- Fellside Community Primary School, Whickham
- Front Street Primary School, Whickham
- Glynwood Community Primary School, Gateshead
- Greenside Primary School, Greenside
- Harlow Green Community Primary School, Gateshead
- High Spen Primary School, High Spen
- Highfield Community Primary School, Rowlands Gill
- Kells Lane Primary School, Low Fell
- Kelvin Grove Community Primary School, Gateshead
- Kibblesworth Academy, Kibblesworth
- Larkspur Community Primary School, Gateshead
- Lingey House Primary School, Gateshead
- Lobley Hill Primary School, Lobley Hill
- Oakfield Infant School, Gateshead
- Oakfield Junior School, Gateshead
- Parkhead Community Primary School, Winlaton
- Portobello Primary School, Birtley
- Ravensworth Terrace Primary School, Birtley
- Riverside Primary Academy, Dunston
- Roman Road Primary School, Gateshead
- Rowlands Gill Primary School, Rowlands Gill
- Ryton Community Infant School, Ryton
- Ryton Junior School, Ryton
- Sacred Heart RC Primary School, Byermoor
- St Agnes RC Primary School, Crawcrook
- St Aidan's CE Primary School, Gateshead
- St Alban's RC Primary School, Pelaw
- St Anne's RC Primary School, Gateshead
- St Augustine's RC Primary School, Gateshead
- St Joseph's RC Infant School, Birtley
- St Joseph's RC Junior School, Birtley
- St Joseph's RC Primary School, Blaydon
- St Joseph's RC Primary School, Gateshead
- St Joseph's RC Primary School, Rowlands Gill
- St Mary's and St Thomas Aquinas RC Primary School, Blaydon
- St Mary's RC Primary School, Whickham
- St Oswald's RC Primary, Wrekenton
- St Peter's RC Primary School, Low Fell
- St Philip Neri RC Primary School, Dunston
- St Wilfrid's RC Primary School, Gateshead
- South Street Community Primary School, Gateshead
- Swalwell Primary School, Swalwell
- Wardley Primary School, Wardley
- Washingwell Community Primary School, Whickham
- Whickham Parochial CE Primary School, Whickham
- White Mere Community Primary School, Wardley
- Windy Nook Primary School, Gateshead
- Winlaton West Lane Community Primary School, Winlaton

=== Secondary schools ===
- Cardinal Hume Catholic School, Gateshead
- Emmanuel College, Lobley Hill
- Grace College, Gateshead
- Heworth Grange School, Felling
- Kingsmeadow Community Comprehensive School, Dunston
- Lord Lawson of Beamish Academy, Birtley
- St Thomas More Catholic School, Blaydon
- Thorp Academy, Ryton
- Whickham School, Whickham
- XP Gateshead, Felling

=== Special and alternative schools ===
- The Cedars Academy, Low Fell
- Dryden School, Low Fell
- Eslington Primary School, Gateshead
- Furrowfield School, Felling
- Gibside School, Bensham
- Hill Top School, Felling
- River Tyne Academy Gateshead, Sheriff Hill

=== Further education ===
- Gateshead College

== Independent schools ==
=== Primary and preparatory schools ===
- Keser Girls School, Gateshead
- Keser Torah Boys' School, Gateshead

=== Senior and all-through schools ===
- Ateres Girls High School, Felling
- The Gateshead Cheder Primary School, Gateshead
- Gateshead Jewish Boarding School, Gateshead

=== Special and alternative schools ===
- Haskel School, Gateshead
