= Bill Quay =

Area of Gateshead, England

Coordinates: 54.95°N 1.53°W

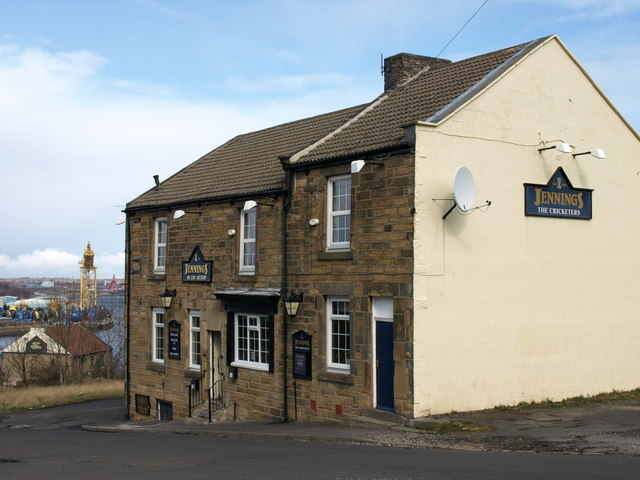
- The Cricketers, Bill Quay

- Location within Tyne and Wear
- Population: 9,100 (2011 Census data for Pelaw and Heworth ward)
- OS grid reference: NZ 2964 6265
- Metropolitan borough: Gateshead
- Metropolitan county: Tyne and Wear
- Region: North East
- Country: England
- Sovereign state: United Kingdom
- Post town: GATESHEAD
- Postcode district: NE10
- Dialling code: 0191
- Police: Northumbria
- Fire: Tyne and Wear
- Ambulance: North East
- UK Parliament: Gateshead

Bill Quay is a residential area in Gateshead, located around 4 miles (6.4 km) from Newcastle upon Tyne, 12 miles (19 km) from Sunderland, and 17 miles (27 km) from Durham. In 2011, Census data for the Gateshead Metropolitan Borough Council ward of Heworth and Pelaw recorded a total population of 9,100.

Bill Quay is situated between Hebburn to the east, and Pelaw to the southwest. It lies on the south bank of the River Tyne, facing Walker. The area is home to Bill Quay Albion Cricket Club, competitors in the Durham Cricket League.

== History ==
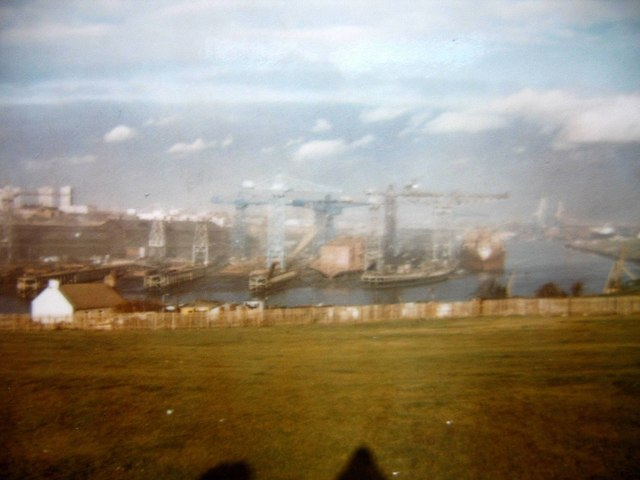
Bill Quay Fields (1976)

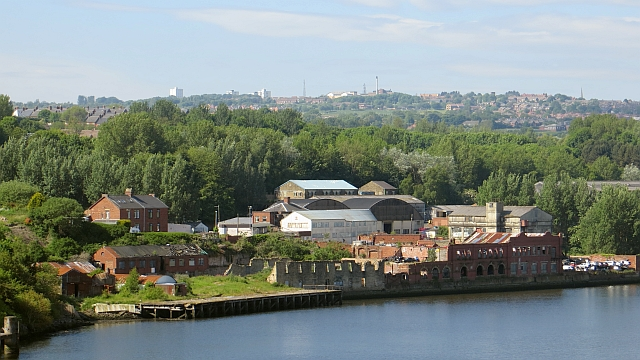
Derelict industrial buildings (2013)

During the nineteenth century, Bill Quay was an industrial area catering for chemical works, bottle works, Robson's Paint, and shipbuilding. The area saw an economic upturn at the end of the nineteenth century, when the Co-Operative Wholesale Society (CWS) opened its vast and extensive string of factories along Shields Road. Boutlands, Harrisons and Wood-Skinner were shipbuilders at Bill Quay, with Harrisons being the final shipbuilder on the south bank of the River Tyne to close.

== Demography ==
According to the 2011 Census, the Pelaw and Heworth ward has a population of 9,100. The ward is split into three distinct districts:

- Bill Quay (population of 1,525) – Located to the east of King George's Field, and to the north of the A185 road.
- Heworth (population of 5,273) – Located to the south of the Tyne and Wear Metro line.
- Pelaw (population of 2,302) – Located to the north of the Tyne and Wear Metro line, and the A185 road.

52.2% of the population are female, slightly above the national average, while 47.8% are male. Only 2.7% of the population were from a black, Asian and minority ethnic (BAME) group, as opposed to 14.6% of the national population.

Data from the 2011 Census found that the average life expectancy in Pelaw and Heworth is 79.1 years for men, and 81.1 years for women. These statistics compare fairly favourably, when compared to the average life expectancy in the North East of England, of 77.4 and 81.4 years, respectively.

Car ownership is lower than the average in the Metropolitan Borough of Gateshead (63.5%), and lower than the national average of 74.2% – with 61.1% of households in the Pelaw and Heworth ward owning at least one car.

Demography (data from 2011 Census)
Demographic	% of population Bill Quay	% of population Gateshead	% of population England
Total population	9,100	200,214	53,012,456
Male	47.8%	48.9%	49.2%
Female	52.2%	51.1%	50.8%
BAME	2.7%	3.7%	14.6%
Age 65+	17.8%	17.6%	16.4%

== Education ==
Bill Quay is served by one primary school, Bill Quay Primary School. In November 2011, the school was rated "good" by Ofsted. Nearby primary schools include St. Alban's Catholic Primary School in Pelaw, and Wardley Primary School and White Mere Community Primary School in Wardley.

In terms of secondary education, Bill Quay is located within the catchment area for Heworth Grange School in Leam Lane. An inspection carried out by Ofsted in January 2017 deemed the school to be "inadequate". St. Alban's Catholic Primary School in Pelaw also acts as a feeder school for Cardinal Hume Catholic School in Wrekenton, rated "outstanding" by Ofsted in January 2014, as well as the nearby St. Joseph's Catholic Academy in Hebburn, which was rated "requires improvement" by Ofsted in January 2019.

== Governance ==
Pelaw and Heworth is a local council ward in the Metropolitan Borough of Gateshead. This ward covers an area of around 1.3 square miles (3.4 km^{2}), and has a population of 9,100. As of April 2020, the ward is served by three councillors: Ian Patterson, John Paul Dilston and Rosy Oxberry. Bill Quay was located within the parliamentary constituency of Jarrow until it was replaced by Jarrow and Gateshead East from 2024.. As of April 2020, the constituencies have beeb served by Kate Osborne.

Gateshead Council Local Elections 2019: Pelaw and Heworth
Candidate	Political party	No. of votes	% of votes
John Paul Dilston	Liberal Democrats	1,222	51.5%
Jill Green	Labour	726	30.6%
Jordan Oliver	UKIP	238	10.0%
Nicholas Boldrini	Green	127	5.3%
Paul Sterling	Conservative	61	2.6%

== Transport ==
=== Air ===
The nearest airport to Bill Quay is Newcastle International Airport, which is located around 11 miles (18 km) away by road. Teesside International Airport and Carlisle Lake District Airport are located around 36 and 58 miles (58 and 93 km) away by road, respectively.

=== Bus ===
Bill Quay is served by Go North East's frequent Crusader 27 service, which runs up to every 10 minutes from Newcastle, Gateshead and Heworth to Hebburn, Jarrow and South Shields.

It is also served by the Gateshead Central Taxis bus services 568, which runs hourly between Heworth and Bill Quay, and 515, which runs hourly between Heworth and Hebburn.

=== Rail ===
The nearest Tyne and Wear Metro station is located at Pelaw. The Tyne and Wear Metro provides a regular service to Newcastle, with trains running up to every 6 minutes (7–8 minutes during the evening and Sunday) between Pelaw and South Gosforth, increasing to up to every 3 minutes at peak times. Heworth is the nearest rail station, with Northern Trains providing an hourly service along the Durham Coast Line.

=== Road ===
Bill Quay is served by the A185 – a route linking the area with Heworth, Hebburn and Jarrow. By road, Gateshead can be reached in around 10 minutes, Newcastle in 15 minutes, and Newcastle International Airport in 30 minutes.

== Bill Quay Community Farm ==
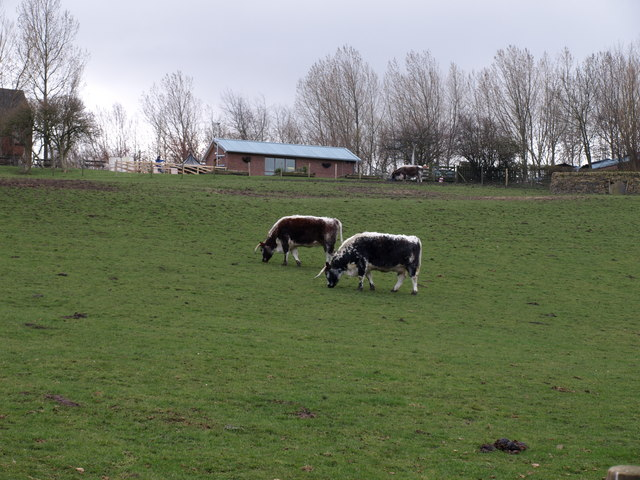
Bill Quay farm

Bill Quay Community Farm is an important urban farm, and one of only 16 farm parks nationally recognised by the Rare Breeds Survival Trust in the UK. Breeds included Tamworth pigs, Jacob sheep, Hebridean sheep, Scots Grey hens and Bagot goats. It used to play host to Chickenstock, an annual showcase festival for local Gateshead based bands. Bill Quay Community Farm opened in 1986 and closed in September 2019, but later reopened. It is managed by a registered charity.

== In fiction ==
The novel Schoolfrenz by Ray Crowther (ISBN 0-9541110-3-6) is set mainly on Tyneside. Bill Quay is mentioned several times and is the location for a murder scene in the book. The author's website (Ray Crowther) contains an extract from Schoolfrenz about Bill Quay, and has photographs of Bill Quay, and the surrounding area.
