= Leam Lane Estate =

Housing estate in Gateshead, England

Coordinates: 54.94°N 1.54°W

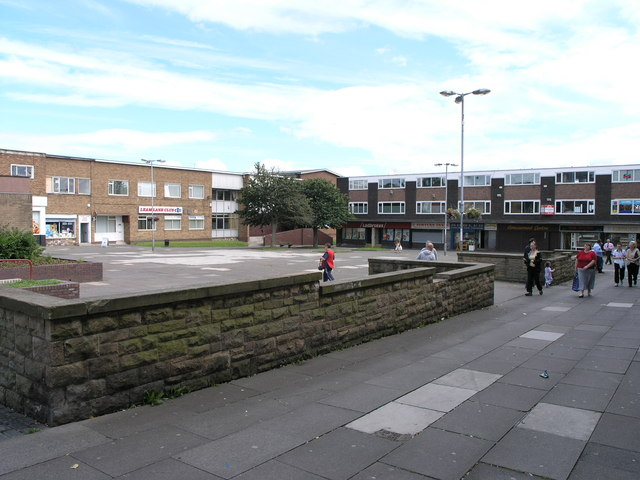
- Fewster Square

- Location within Tyne and Wear
- Population: 8,327 (2011 Census data for Wardley and Leam Lane)
- OS grid reference: NZ 2964 6041
- Metropolitan borough: Gateshead
- Metropolitan county: Tyne and Wear
- Region: North East
- Country: England
- Sovereign state: United Kingdom
- Post town: GATESHEAD
- Postcode district: NE9, NE10
- Dialling code: 0191
- Police: Northumbria
- Fire: Tyne and Wear
- Ambulance: North East
- UK Parliament: Jarrow and Gateshead East

Leam Lane Estate is a housing estate in Gateshead, built in the 1950s and early 1960s. Originally made up solely of council-built accommodation and housing association houses, most of the properties are now privately owned. The estate is located around 4 miles (6.4 km) from Newcastle upon Tyne, 10.5 miles (16.9 km) from Sunderland, and 15.5 miles (24.9 km) from Durham. In 2011, Census data for the Gateshead Metropolitan Borough Council ward of Wardley and Leam Lane recorded a total population of 8,327.

The estate's main shopping area, Fewster Square, provides a number of amenities, including independent shops, two supermarkets, post office, and medical centre. The nearby Oliver Henderson Park includes a play area, lake, skateboard park and a bowling green, as well as a large grass football pitch.

Leam Lane Estate is bordered by Heworth, Whitehills Estate, Springwell Estate, Wardley and Windy Nook. Most of the estate is in the NE10 postcode, with NE9 covering the upper side of Leam Lane, at the border with Springwell.

== Demography ==
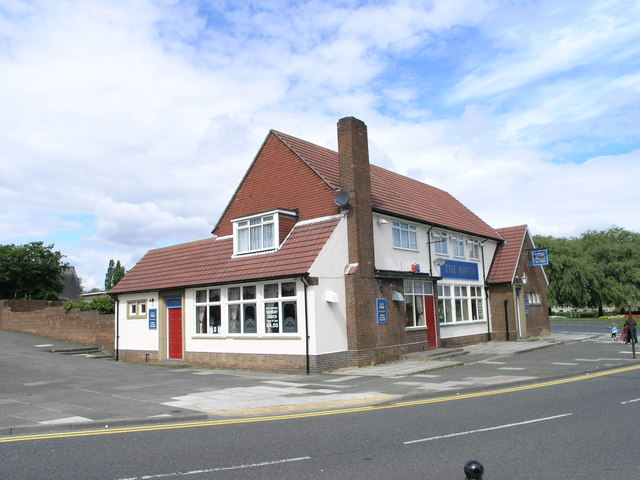
The Bugle public house

According to the 2011 Census, the Wardley and Leam Lane ward has a population of 8,327. 51.2% of the population are female, slightly above the national average, while 48.8% are male. Only 2.5% of the population were from a black, Asian and minority ethnic (BAME) group, as opposed to 14.6% of the national population.

Data from the 2011 Census found that the average life expectancy in Wardley and Leam Lane is 79.9 years for men, and 81.9 years for women. These statistics compare fairly favorably, when compared to the average life expectancy in the North East of England, of 77.4 and 81.4 years, respectively.

Car ownership is higher than the average in the Metropolitan Borough of Gateshead (63.5%), but lower than the national average of 74.2% – with 67.8% of households in the Wardley and Leam Lane ward owning at least one car.

Demography (data from 2011 Census)
Demographic	% of population Leam Lane	% of population Gateshead	% of population England
Total population	8,327	200,214	53,012,456
Male	48.8%	48.9%	49.2%
Female	51.2%	51.1%	50.8%
BAME	2.5%	3.7%	14.6%
Age 65+	17.5%	17.6%	16.4%

== Education ==
Leam Lane Estate is served by four primary schools: Colegate Community Primary School and St. Augustine's Catholic Primary School – both of which were rated "good" by Ofsted. Also, Lingey House Primary School and Roman Road Primary School – both of which were rated "outstanding". Nearby primary schools also include The Drive Community Primary School in Heworth, St. Alban's Catholic Primary School in Pelaw, and Wardley Primary School and White Mere Community Primary School in Wardley.

In terms of secondary education, Leam Lane Estate is located within the catchment area for Heworth Grange School. An inspection carried out by Ofsted in January 2017 deemed the school to be "inadequate". Students from the area also attend the nearby Cardinal Hume Catholic School in Wrekenton, rated "outstanding" by Ofsted in January 2014, as well as St. Joseph's Catholic Academy in Hebburn, which was rated "requires improvement" by Ofsted in January 2019.

== Governance ==
Wardley and Leam Lane is a local council ward in the Metropolitan Borough of Gateshead. This ward covers an area of around 1.6 square miles (4.1 km^{2}), and has a population of 8,327. As of April 2020, the ward is served by three councillors: Anne Wheeler, Linda Green and Stuart Green. Leam Lane Estate is located within the parliamentary constituencies of Gateshead. As of April 2020, the constituency is served by MP Kate Osbourne

Gateshead Council Local Elections 2019: Wardley and Leam Lane
Candidate	Political party	No. of votes	% of votes
John Stuart Green	Labour	1,034	53.9%
Alan Robert Craig	UKIP	431	22.5%
Susan Walker	Liberal Democrats	262	13.7%
John Robert McNeil	Conservative	190	9.9%

== Transport ==
=== Air ===
The nearest airport to Leam Lane Estate is Newcastle International Airport, which is located around 11.5 miles (18.5 km) away by road. Teesside International Airport and Carlisle Lake District Airport are located around 34.5 and 60 miles (55.5 and 96.6 km) away by road, respectively.

=== Bus ===
Leam Lane Estate is served by Go North East's local bus services, with services 51, 52, 57 and 58 serving Gateshead and Newcastle upon Tyne. They also operate services 67 and 69, which serve Wardley, Winlaton and the Metrocentre.

=== Rail ===
The nearest Tyne and Wear Metro stations are located at Pelaw and Heworth. The Tyne and Wear Metro provides a regular service to Newcastle, with trains running up to every 6 minutes (7–8 minutes during the evening and Sunday) between Pelaw and South Gosforth, increasing to up to every 3 minutes at peak times. Heworth is the nearest rail station, with Northern Trains providing an hourly service along the Durham Coast Line.

=== Road ===
Leam Lane Estate is located near to the A184 – a busy route linking South Tyneside with Gateshead and Newcastle upon Tyne. By road, Gateshead can be reached in around 10 minutes, Newcastle in 15 minutes, and Newcastle International Airport in 30 minutes.

== People from Leam Lane Estate ==
- Chris Waddle – former professional football player and manager
- Jill Halfpenny – actress, best known for her roles in Coronation Street, EastEnders and Waterloo Road
- Kieran Reilly - Freestyle BMX World Champion and Olympic Silver Medalist

== In the media ==
The world's first online home shopping took place in the area, when resident, Jane Snowball, bought an item from a local Tesco supermarket in May 1984, by using her television set and remote control. The scheme had been developed by Newcastle University lecturer, Ross Davies, in conjunction with Rediffusion.
