= Heworth, Tyne and Wear =

Area of Gateshead, England

Coordinates: 54.94°N 1.55°W

Heworth
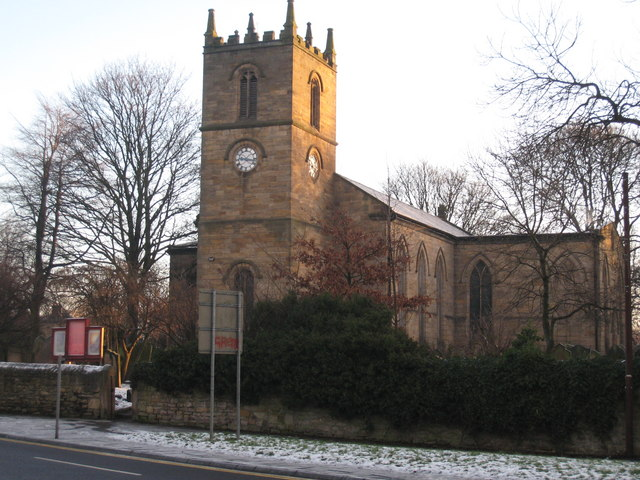
- St Mary's Church, Heworth

- Location within Tyne and Wear
- Population: 9,100 (2011 Census data for Pelaw and Heworth ward)
- OS grid reference: NZ 2872 6148
- Metropolitan borough: Gateshead
- Metropolitan county: Tyne and Wear
- Region: North East
- Country: England
- Sovereign state: United Kingdom
- Post town: GATESHEAD
- Postcode district: NE10
- Dialling code: 0191
- Police: Northumbria
- Fire: Tyne and Wear
- Ambulance: North East
- UK Parliament: Jarrow and Gateshead East

Heworth (/ˈhjuːwərθ/) is a residential area in Gateshead, in the county of Tyne and Wear, England. It is located around 3 miles (4.8 km) from Newcastle upon Tyne, 11 miles (18 km) from Sunderland, and 17 miles (27 km) from Durham. In 2011, Census data for the Gateshead Metropolitan Borough Council ward of Heworth and Pelaw recorded a total population of 9,100. Until 1974 it was in County Durham. The Heworth Burn flows through Heworth.

== History ==
The village's name appears in written records from 1091 as Hewarde, later as Hewrtha, and in 1300 as Hewrthe. In common with most villages in the area, Heworth's history has been intertwined with the fortunes of the quarrying and mining industries. Two large quarries operated in the area, one of which was located at Windy Nook, which is now infilled and used as a public recreation area. The other was located at Low Burn, which is now the site of a cemetery. Heworth Colliery occupied a site to the south-east of Windy Nook quarry, with its own connection to the Pelaw Main Waggonway giving access to the Pelaw Main coal staithes on the River Tyne at Bill Quay.

St. Mary's Church has been a centrepoint of Heworth since around AD 684, with the current church building dating from 1822. The graveyard houses the Haddon Tomb (also known as The Babes in the Bed) – an unusual memorial in the shape of a four poster bed, to three of the Haddon children, William, George and their sister, whose name is now illegible. Local legend has it that the three children died in a fire when a candle fell onto their bed, whilst they were sleeping. This is unlikely to have been the case, as their deaths span a period of six years between 1711 and 1717. It was built by their father, Joseph Haddon, a master mason, who died in 1721, aged 42 years.

== Demography ==
According to the 2011 Census, the Pelaw and Heworth ward has a population of 9,100. The ward is split into three distinct districts:

- Bill Quay (population of 1,525) – Located to the east of King George's Field, and to the north of the A185 road.
- Heworth (population of 5,273) – Located to the south of the Tyne and Wear Metro line.
- Pelaw (population of 2,302) – Located to the north of the Tyne and Wear Metro line, and the A185 road.

52.2% of the population are female, slightly above the national average, while 47.8% are male. Only 2.7% of the population were from a black, Asian and minority ethnic (BAME) group, as opposed to 14.6% of the national population.

Data from the 2011 Census found that the average life expectancy in Pelaw and Heworth is 79.1 years for men, and 81.1 years for women. These statistics compare fairly favourably, when compared to the average life expectancy in the North East of England, of 77.4 and 81.4 years, respectively.

Car ownership is lower than the average in the Metropolitan Borough of Gateshead (63.5%), but lower than the national average of 74.2% – with 61.1% of households in the Pelaw and Heworth ward owning at least one car.

Demography (data from 2011 Census)
Demographic	% of population Heworth	% of population Gateshead	% of population England
Total population	9,100	200,214	53,012,456
Male	47.8%	48.9%	49.2%
Female	52.2%	51.1%	50.8%
BAME	2.7%	3.7%	14.6%
Age 65+	17.8%	17.6%	16.4%

== Education ==
Heworth is served by one primary school, The Drive Community Primary School. In November 2012, the school was rated "good" by Ofsted. Nearby primary schools include Brandling Primary School and Falla Park Community Primary School in Felling, Colegate Community Primary School, Lingey House Primary School and St. Augustine's Catholic Primary School in Leam Lane, and St. Alban's Catholic Primary School in Pelaw.

In terms of secondary education, Heworth is located within the catchment area for Heworth Grange School in Leam Lane. An inspection carried out by Ofsted in January 2017 deemed the school to be "inadequate". Students from the area also attend the nearby Cardinal Hume Catholic School in Wrekenton, rated "outstanding" by Ofsted in January 2014, as well as St. Joseph's Catholic Academy in Hebburn, which was rated "requires improvement" by Ofsted in January 2019.

== Governance ==
Pelaw and Heworth is a local council ward in the Metropolitan Borough of Gateshead. This ward covers an area of around 1.3 square miles (3.4 km^{2}), and has a population of 9,100. As of April 2020, the ward is served by three councillors: Ian Patterson, John Paul Dilston and Rosy Oxberry. Heworth is located within the parliamentary constituency of Gateshead. As of April 2020, the constituency is served by MPs Ian Mearns.

Gateshead Council Local Elections 2019: Pelaw and Heworth
Candidate	Political party	No. of votes	% of votes
John Paul Dilston	Liberal Democrats	1,222	51.5%
Jill Green	Labour	726	30.6%
Jordan Oliver	UKIP	238	10.0%
Nicholas Boldrini	Green	127	5.3%
Paul Sterling	Conservative	61	2.6%

Heworth was formerly a township and chapelry in the parish of Jarrow, in 1866 Heworth became a separate civil parish, on 1 April 1974 the parish was abolished. In 1911 the parish had a population of 21,912. In 1974 it became part of the metropolitan district of Gateshead.

== Transport ==
=== Air ===
The nearest airport to Heworth is Newcastle International Airport, which is located around 10 miles (16 km) away by road. Teesside International Airport is located around 36 miles (58 km) away by road.

=== Bus ===
Heworth is served by Go North East's local bus services, with frequent routes serving Gateshead, as well as Newcastle upon Tyne, South Tyneside and Washington.

=== Rail ===
Heworth Interchange is a stop on the following lines:

- Tyne and Wear Metro's Green line, between South Hylton and Newcastle Airport, via Newcastle Central.
- Tyne and Wear Metro's Yellow line between South Shields and St James, via Whitley Bay.
- Durham Coast Line on the National Rail network. Northern Trains provides an hourly service between Newcastle, Sunderland, Hartlepool and Middlesbrough.

=== Road ===
Heworth is bissected by the A184, a busy route linking South Tyneside with Gateshead and Newcastle upon Tyne. By road, Gateshead can be reached in under 10 minutes, Newcastle in 15 minutes and the airport in 25 minutes.
