= Pelaw =

Area of Gateshead, Tyne & Wear, England

Coordinates: 54.95°N 1.54°W

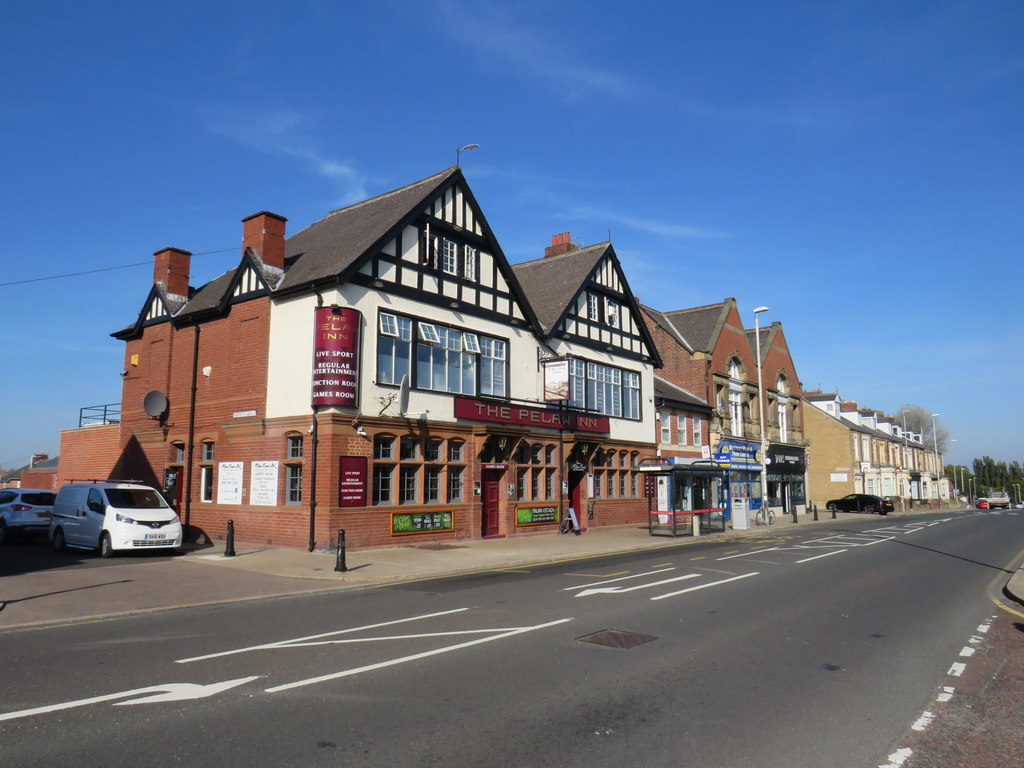
- Pelaw Inn on Shields Road

- Location within Tyne and Wear
- Population: 9,100 (2011 Census data for Pelaw and Heworth ward)
- OS grid reference: NZ 2916 6228
- Metropolitan borough: Gateshead
- Metropolitan county: Tyne and Wear
- Region: North East
- Country: England
- Sovereign state: United Kingdom
- Post town: GATESHEAD
- Postcode district: NE10
- Dialling code: 0191
- Police: Northumbria
- Fire: Tyne and Wear
- Ambulance: North East
- UK Parliament: Jarrow and Gateshead East

Pelaw (/ˈpiːlɔː/) is a residential area in Gateshead, located around 3.5 miles (5.6 km) from Newcastle upon Tyne, 11 miles (18 km) from Sunderland and 17 miles (27 km) from Durham. The United Kingdom 2011 census data for the Gateshead Metropolitan Borough Council ward of Heworth and Pelaw recorded a total population of 9,100.

Pelaw lies in between the older settlements of Heworth to the west, Bill Quay to the east and Wardley to the south; it northern border is the southern bank of the River Tyne.

== History ==
Pelaw came into being due to the huge Victorian factory complexes of the Co-operative Wholesale Society (CWS), which was the manufacturing division of the then burgeoning Co-op movement, which grew up along the length of the Shields Road. This mile-long stretch of red-brick industry was home to factories making clothing and textiles, furniture, pharmaceuticals, household cleaning products, quilts, books and magazines and the world-famous 'Pelaw' shoe polish.

The factories created Pelaw and were a significant employer in the area during most of the twentieth century. Due to inevitable foreign competition, the prevailing economic climate and government policies of the times, the majority of the factories were closed and demolished between the mid-1970s and early 1990s; these were replaced in recent years by modern housing estates.

Only one of the original CWS buildings – the Cabinet Factory – is extant. The Cabinet Factory in Bill Quay, which later became a major Brentford Nylons plant, has been redeveloped; it now houses Stonehills Business Park. The last factory to be demolished was the Shirt Factory, the site has since been redeveloped in to a supermarket.

== Demography ==
According to the 2011 Census, the Pelaw and Heworth ward has a population of 9,100. The ward is split into three distinct districts:

- Bill Quay (population of 1,525) – Located to the east of King George's Field and to the north of the A185 road.
- Heworth (population of 5,273) – Located to the south of the Tyne & Wear Metro line.
- Pelaw (population of 2,302) – Located to the north of the Tyne & Wear Metro line and the A185 road.

52.2% of the population are female, slightly above the national average, while 47.8% are male. Only 2.7% of the population were from a black, Asian and minority ethnic (BAME) group, as opposed to 14.6% of the national population.

Data from the 2011 Census found that the average life expectancy in Pelaw and Heworth is 79.1 years for men and 81.1 years for women. These statistics compare fairly favourably, when compared to the average life expectancy in the North East of England, of 77.4 and 81.4 years, respectively.

Car ownership is lower than the average in the Metropolitan Borough of Gateshead (63.5%), but lower than the national average of 74.2% – with 61.1% of households in the Pelaw and Heworth ward owning at least one car.

Demography (data from 2011 Census)
Demographic	% of population Pelaw	% of population Gateshead	% of population England
Total population	9,100	200,214	53,012,456
Male	47.8%	48.9%	49.2%
Female	52.2%	51.1%	50.8%
BAME	2.7%	3.7%	14.6%
Age 65+	17.8%	17.6%	16.4%

In Pelaw, there is a significant contrast between ethnic groups. For example, the five output areas that covering the centre of Pelaw are around 90% White British, with the most ethnically diverse output area being 88.1%. The four output areas on the eastern and western edges of the district are all at least 97% White British, with the least ethnically diverse output area being 99.2%. Pelaw is more ethnically diverse than other districts within Gateshead, such as Leam Lane and Windy Nook, but less so, when compared with Felling and Saltwell.

== Education ==
Pelaw is served by one primary school, St. Alban's Catholic Primary School. In June 2017, the school was rated Good by Ofsted. Nearby primary schools include Bill Quay Primary School in Bill Quay, The Drive Community Primary School in Heworth, and Wardley Primary School and White Mere Community Primary School in Wardley.

In terms of secondary education, Pelaw is located within the catchment area for Heworth Grange School in Leam Lane. An inspection carried out by Ofsted in January 2017 deemed the school to be Inadequate. St. Alban's Catholic Primary School also acts as a feeder school for Cardinal Hume Catholic School in Wrekenton, rated "outstanding" by Ofsted in January 2014, as well as St. Joseph's Catholic Academy in Hebburn, which was rated "requires improvement" by Ofsted in January 2019.

== Governance ==
Pelaw and Heworth is a local council ward in the Metropolitan Borough of Gateshead. This ward covers an area of around 1.3 square miles (3.4 km^{2}) and has a population of 9,100. As of July 2025, the ward is served by three councillors: Ian Patterson, John Paul Dilston and Amanda Wintcher. Pelaw was located within the parliamentary constituency of Jarrow. Between 2019-2024, the constituency was served by Kate Osborne after which the constituency ceased to exist.

Gateshead Council Local Elections 2024: Pelaw and Heworth
Candidate	Political party	No. of votes	% of votes
Ian Patterson	Liberal Democrats	1,290	55.5%
Jennifer Reay	Labour	765	32.9%
Nicholas Boldrini	Green	208	8.9%
Ali Reza Akbari Pargam	Conservative	63	2.7%

== Transport ==
=== Railway ===
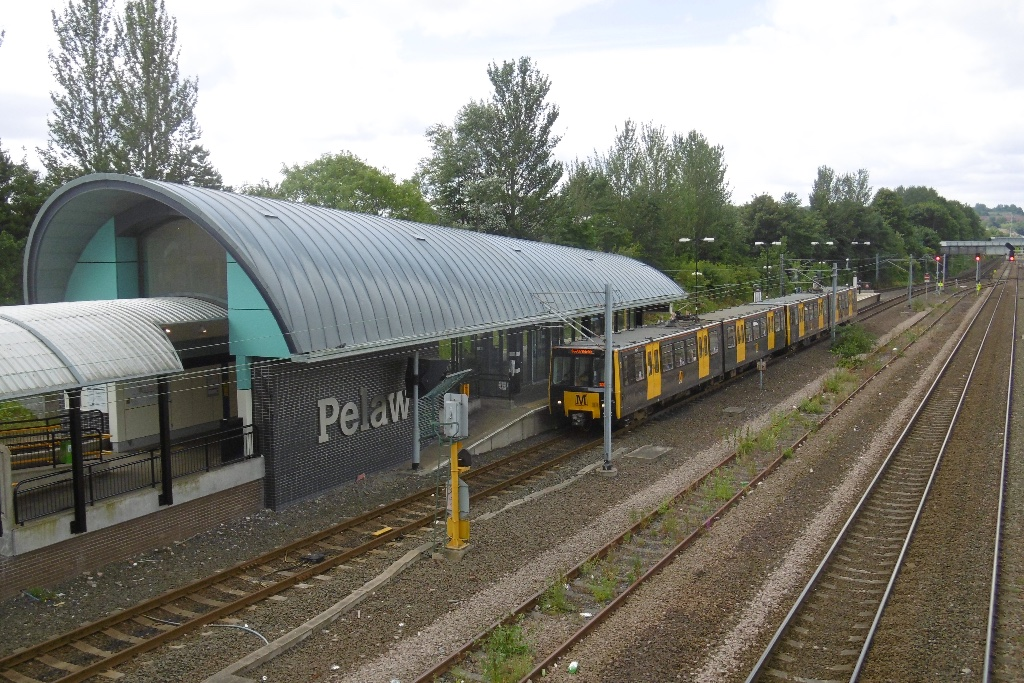
Pelaw Metro station.

Pelaw Metro station is served by the Tyne and Wear Metro. Nexus operates a regular service on the Green line between Newcastle Airport, Newcastle, Gateshead and South Hylton.

Heworth Interchange is the nearest National Rail station, with Northern Trains providing an hourly service along the Durham Coast Line between Hexham, Newcastle, Sunderland, Nunthorpe and Whitby.

Historically, Pelaw is the site of a railway junction located on the original route of the East Coast Main Line. Pelaw Junction was the former meeting point of the Brandling Junction Railway, Leamside Line and Durham Coast Line. The Leamside Line closed to passengers in 1964, under the Beeching Axe, and to freight in the 1990s.

=== Buses ===
Pelaw is served by the following bus routes:

- Go North East's frequent Crusader 27 service, between Newcastle, Gateshead, Heworth, Hebburn, Jarrow and South Shields
- Gateshead Central Buses' route 515, which runs hourly between Queen Elizabeth Hospital and Hebburn, and the 568 hourly between Heworth and Bill Quay.

=== Roads ===
Pelaw is served by the A185 – a route linking the area with Heworth, Hebburn and Jarrow. Gateshead can be reached in around 10 minutes, Newcastle in 15 minutes and the airport in 30 minutes.

=== Airports ===
The nearest airport to Pelaw is Newcastle International Airport, which is located around 10 miles (16 km) away by metro and road. Teesside International Airport and Carlisle Lake District Airport are located around 36 and 57 miles (58 and 92 km) away respectively.

== People from Pelaw ==
- Bobby Hughes – Footballer who played in the Football League for Wigan Borough and Brentford.
- Chris Waddle – England international footballer, who won three French Liege 1 titles with Olympique de Marseille.
- John Thain – Footballer who played in the Football League for Brentford, Grimsby Town and Newcastle United.
- Ronnie Starling – England international footballer and captain of 1935 FA Cup winners, Sheffield Wednesday.
- The juvenile jazz band, The Pelaw Hussars, appeared in the film Get Carter.
- George Nicholson –Footballer who played in the Football League for Bolton Wanderers and Cardiff City.

== See also ==
- Co-operative Wholesale Society
- South Pelaw
