= Springwell Village =

Village in Tyne and Wear, England

Coordinates: 54.919°N 1.553°W

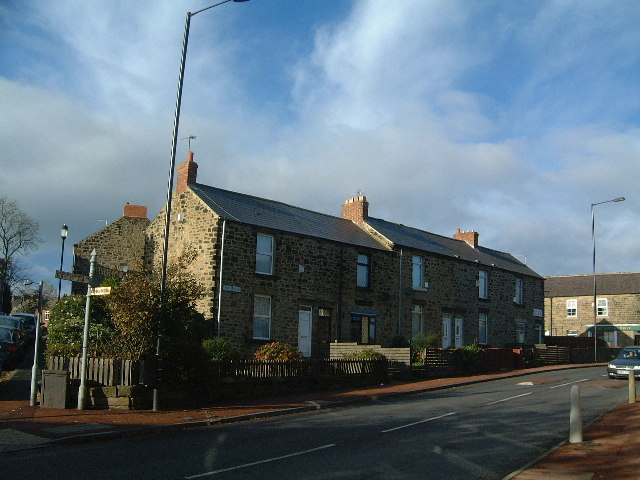
- Stone cottages on the main road

- Location within Tyne and Wear
- Population: 11,833 (2011 Census data for Washington West ward)
- OS grid reference: NZ 2882 5836
- Metropolitan borough: City of Sunderland
- Metropolitan county: Tyne and Wear
- Region: North East
- Country: England
- Sovereign state: United Kingdom
- Post town: GATESHEAD
- Postcode district: NE9
- Dialling code: 0191
- Police: Northumbria
- Fire: Tyne and Wear
- Ambulance: North East
- UK Parliament: Washington and Gateshead South

Springwell Village is a village in the Metropolitan Borough of Gateshead, approximately 7.6 miles (12.2 km) from Newcastle upon Tyne, 9 miles (14 km) from Sunderland, and 13 miles (21 km) from Durham. In 2011, Census data for the City of Sunderland ward of Washington West recorded a total population of 11,833.

The village is home to one church, Springwell Village Methodist Church, as well as three shops and two local pubs – The Guidepost in the centre of the village, and The Ship on the outskirts. The area surrounding the village consists mainly of farmland, as well as land used for equestrian activities.

== History ==
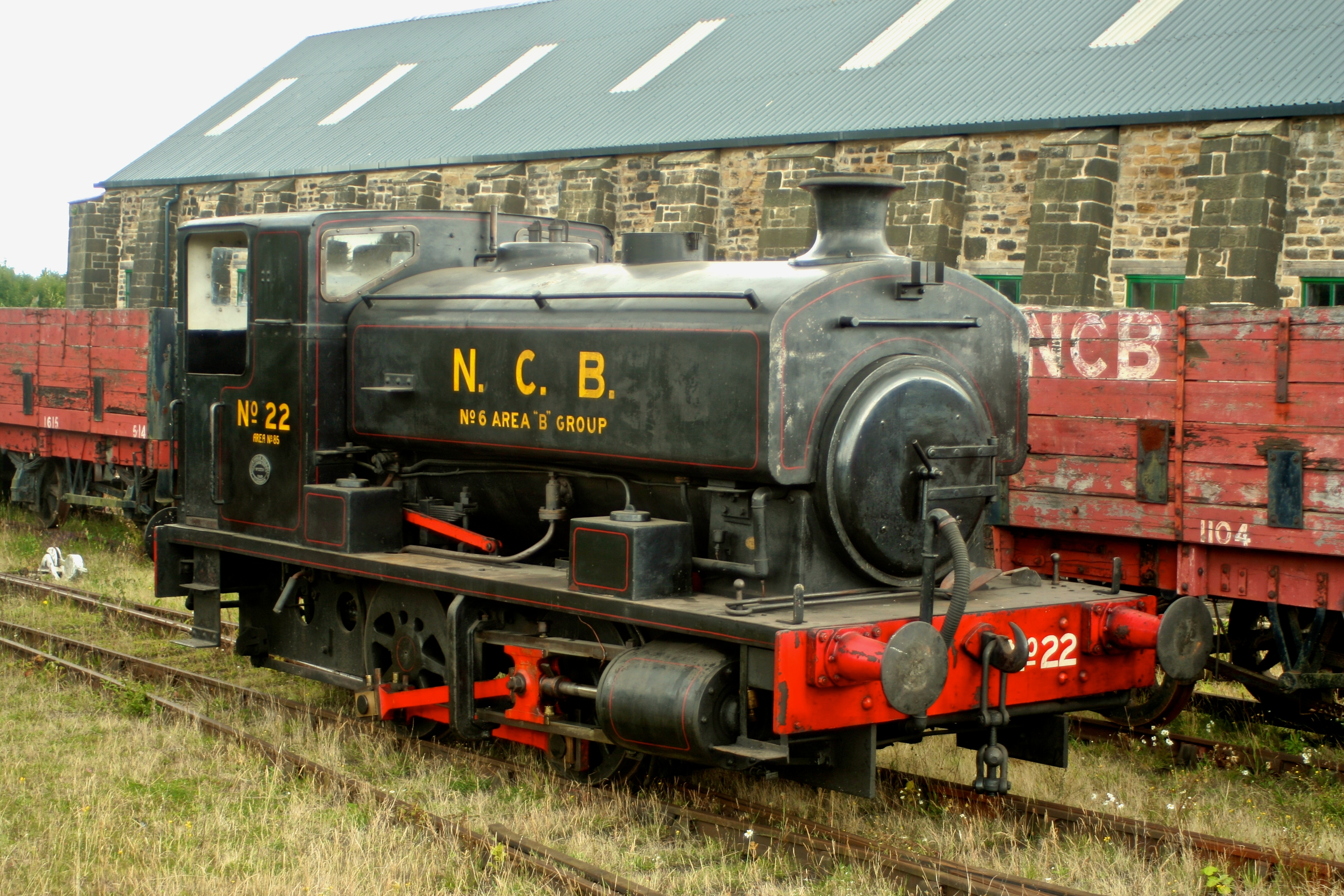
Bowes Railway Museum

The first residences in the area were constructed in 1821 to house workers of the nearby colliery. The village has retained much character, according to Rightmove the average sold price in the year up to October 2021 was £167,565. It has a mix of small private estates situated in the centre, social housing at the eastern and western extremities, and south alongside a large proportion of individual properties and small stone terrace cottages, built of local, low quality stone, a style typical within the village.

The Bowes Railway Museum is located on the outskirts of the village. The railway served the colliery at Springwell Village from 1826 until 1974, with a short part of the route now operating as a railway museum.

Formerly a part of County Durham, the postal address is Gateshead, with the village now situated in the City of Sunderland. The village has close ties to Washington, Sunderland, Gateshead and Newcastle upon Tyne.

== Demography ==
According to the 2011 Census, the Washington West ward has a population of 11,833. 51.4% of the population are female, slightly above the national average, while 48.6% are male. Only 2.1% of the population were from a black, Asian and minority ethnic (BAME) group, as opposed to 14.6% of the national population.

Data from the 2011 Census found that the average life expectancy in Washington West is 78.0 years for men, and 79.5 years for women. These statistics compare favourably for men, but less so for women, when compared to the average life expectancy in the North East of England, of 77.4 and 81.4 years, respectively.

Car ownership is significantly higher than the average in the City of Sunderland (64.9%), as well as being higher the national average of 74.2% – with 75.0% of households in the Washington West ward owning at least one car.

Demography (data from 2011 Census)
Demographic	% of population Springwell	% of population Sunderland	% of population England
Total population	8,327	275,506	53,012,456
Male	48.6%	48.6%	49.2%
Female	51.4%	51.4%	50.8%
BAME	2.1%	4.1%	14.6%
Age 65+	15.5%	17.0%	16.4%

== Education ==
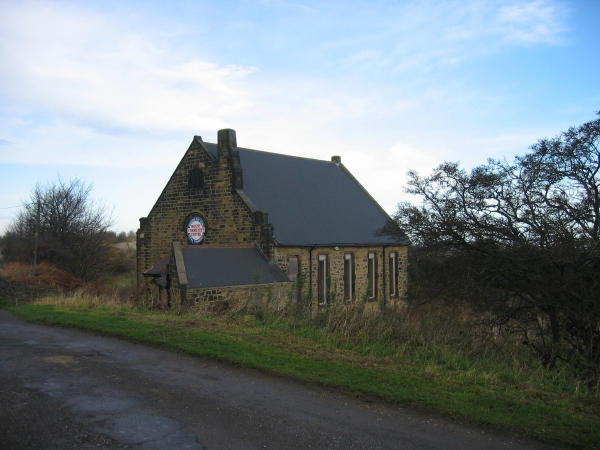
Mount Community Centre

Springwell Village is served by Springwell Village Primary School, which was rated "good" by Ofsted in July 2015. Nearby primary schools include Roman Road Primary School and St. Augustine's Catholic Primary School in Leam Lane, Fell Dyke Community Primary School in Wrekenton, and George Washington Primary School in Usworth.

In terms of secondary education, students attend the nearby Cardinal Hume Catholic School in Wrekenton, rated "outstanding" by Ofsted in January 2014, as well as Lord Lawson of Beamish Academy in Birtley, and St. Robert of Newminster Catholic School in Fatfield.

== Governance ==
Washington West is a local council ward in the City of Sunderland, and has a population of 11,833. As of April 2020, the ward is served by three councillors: Bernard Scaplehorn, Dorothy Trueman and Henry Trueman. Springwell Village is located within the parliamentary constituency of Washington and Sunderland West. As of April 2020, the constituency is served by MP Sharon Hodgson.

Sunderland City Council Local Elections 2019: Washington West
Candidate	Political party	No. of votes	% of votes
Harry Trueman	Labour	1,235	42.6%
Kevin John Sheppard	UKIP	674	23.3%
Olwyn Bird	Conservative	440	15.2%
Paul Andrew Leonard	Green	405	14.0%
Odet Mark Aszkenasy	Liberal Democrats	144	5.0%

== Transport ==
=== Air ===
The nearest airport to Springwell Village is Newcastle International Airport, which is located around 15 miles (24 km) away by road. Teesside International Airport and Carlisle Lake District Airport are located around 32.5 and 60 miles (52.3 and 96.6 km) away by road, respectively.

=== Bus ===
Springwell Village is served by Go North East's local bus services, with frequent routes serving Newcastle upon Tyne, Gateshead, Sunderland and Washington.

=== Rail ===
The nearest Tyne and Wear Metro station is located at Heworth. The Tyne and Wear Metro provides a regular service to Sunderland and Newcastle, with trains running up to every 6 minutes (7–8 minutes during the evening and Sunday) between Pelaw and South Gosforth, increasing to up to every 3 minutes at peak times. Heworth is also the nearest rail station, with Northern Trains providing an hourly service along the Durham Coast Line.

=== Road ===
Springwell Village is well served by road links, located a short distance from the A1 and A1231. By road, Newcastle can be reached in around 15 minutes, Sunderland in 20 minutes, and Newcastle International Airport in 25 minutes.

== People from Springwell Village ==
- Herbert Watson – A professional football player, who played in the Football League for Middlesbrough, Brentford and Bristol Rovers in the late 1920s and 1930s.
- Paul Thirlwell – A professional footballer, and former England Under 21 player, who currently plays for, and U21s manager of Harrogate Town.
