= Wardley, Gateshead =

Area of Gateshead, England

Coordinates: 54.95°N 1.53°W

Wardley
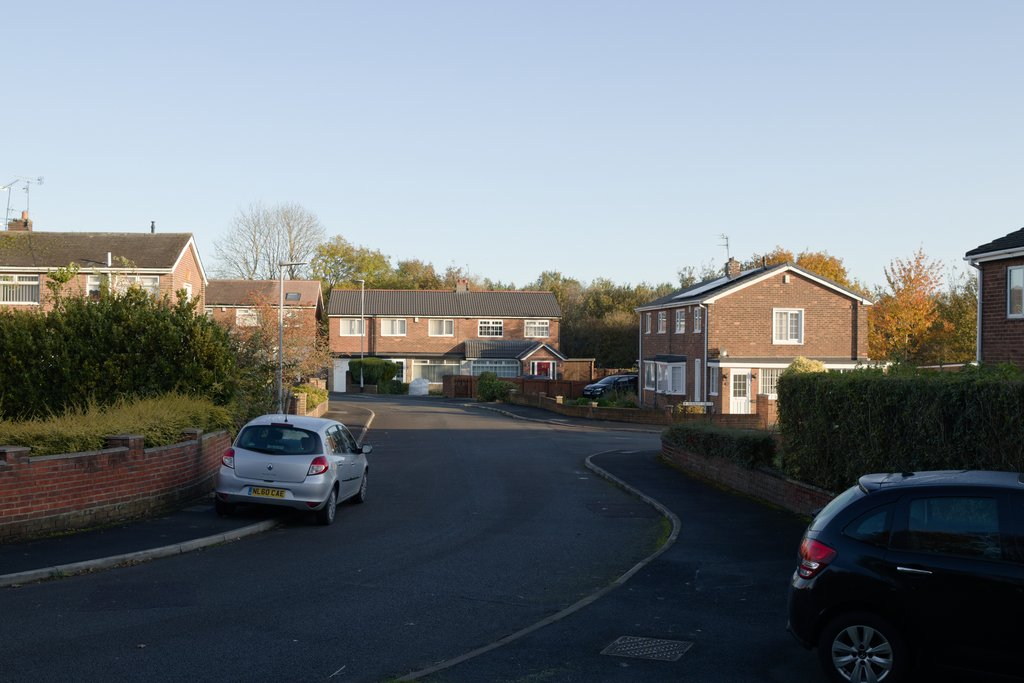
- Wardley Drive

- Location within Tyne and Wear
- Population: 8,327 (2011 Census data for Wardley and Leam Lane ward)
- OS grid reference: NZ 3085 6135
- Metropolitan borough: Gateshead
- Metropolitan county: Tyne and Wear
- Region: North East
- Country: England
- Sovereign state: United Kingdom
- Post town: GATESHEAD
- Postcode district: NE10
- Dialling code: 0191
- Police: Northumbria
- Fire: Tyne and Wear
- Ambulance: North East
- UK Parliament: Gateshead & Jarrow

Wardley is a residential area in Gateshead, located around 4 miles (6.4 km) from Newcastle upon Tyne, 10 miles (16 km) from Sunderland, and 15 miles (24 km) from Durham. In 2011, Census data for the Gateshead Metropolitan Borough Council ward of Wardley and Leam Lane recorded a total population of 8,327.

Wardley is made up of mainly privately owned housing, with a number of local shops located on Keir Hardie Avenue, and a post office, which is situated on Lingey Avenue. A bar and brasserie, The Green, is located on Leam Lane, along with Heworth Golf Club.

== Demography ==
According to the 2011 Census, the Wardley and Leam Lane ward has a population of 8,327. 51.2% of the population are female, slightly above the national average, while 48.8% are male. Only 2.5% of the population were from a black, Asian and minority ethnic (BAME) group, as opposed to 14.6% of the national population.

Data from the 2011 Census found that the average life expectancy in Wardley and Leam Lane is 79.9 years for men, and 81.9 years for women. These statistics compare fairly favorably, when compared to the average life expectancy in the North East of England, of 77.4 and 81.4 years, respectively.

Car ownership is higher than the average in the Metropolitan Borough of Gateshead (63.5%), but lower than the national average of 74.2% – with 67.8% of households in the Wardley and Leam Lane ward owning at least one car.

Demography (data from 2011 Census)
Demographic	% of population Wardley	% of population Gateshead	% of population England
Total population	8,327	200,214	53,012,456
Male	48.8%	48.9%	49.2%
Female	51.2%	51.1%	50.8%
BAME	2.5%	3.7%	14.6%
Age 65+	17.5%	17.6%	16.4%

== Education ==
Wardley is served by two primary schools: Wardley Primary School and White Mere Community Primary School – both of which are rated "good" by Ofsted. Nearby primary schools include Lingey House Primary School and St. Augustine's Primary School in Leam Lane, and St. Alban's Catholic Primary School in Pelaw.

In terms of secondary education, Wardley is located within the catchment area for Heworth Grange School in Leam Lane. An inspection carried out by Ofsted in January 2017 deemed the school to be "inadequate". Students from the area also attend the nearby Cardinal Hume Catholic School in Wrekenton, rated "outstanding" by Ofsted in January 2014, as well as St. Joseph's Catholic Academy in Hebburn, which was rated "requires improvement" by Ofsted in January 2019.

== Governance ==
Wardley and Leam Lane is a local council ward in the Metropolitan Borough of Gateshead. This ward covers an area of around 1.6 square miles (4.1 km^{2}), and has a population of 8,327. As of April 2020, the ward is served by three councillors: Anne Wheeler, Linda Green and Stuart Green. Wardley is located within the parliamentary constituencies of both Gateshead and Jarrow. As of April 2020, constituencies are served by MPs Ian Mearns and Kate Osborne, respectively.

Gateshead Council Local Elections 2019: Wardley and Leam Lane
Candidate	Political party	No. of votes	% of votes
John Stuart Green	Labour	1,034	53.9%
Alan Robert Craig	UKIP	431	22.5%
Susan Walker	Liberal Democrats	262	13.7%
John Robert McNeil	Conservative	190	9.9%

== Transport ==
=== Air ===
The nearest airport to Wardley is Newcastle International Airport, which is located around 12 miles (19 km) away by road. Teesside International Airport and Carlisle Lake District Airport are located around 35 and 58 miles (56 and 93 km) away by road, respectively.

=== Bus ===
Wardley is served by Go North East's local bus services, with frequent routes serving Gateshead, as well as Newcastle upon Tyne, South Tyneside and Washington, the most notable being service 57 to Newcastle, which operates every thirty minutes. They also operate services 67 and 69 to the Metrocentre and Winlaton.

=== Rail ===
The nearest Tyne and Wear Metro stations are located at Pelaw and Heworth. The Tyne and Wear Metro provides a regular service to Newcastle, with trains running up to every 6 minutes (7–8 minutes during the evening and Sunday) between Pelaw and South Gosforth, increasing to up to every 3 minutes at peak times. Heworth is the nearest rail station, with Northern Trains providing an hourly service along the Durham Coast Line.

=== Road ===
Wardley is dissected by the A184 – a busy route linking South Tyneside with Gateshead and Newcastle upon Tyne. By road, Gateshead can be reached in around 10 minutes, Newcastle in 15 minutes, and Newcastle International Airport in 30 minutes.
