= List of schools in Tyne and Wear =

There is no county-wide local education authority in Tyne and Wear, instead education services are provided by the five smaller metropolitan boroughs of Gateshead, Newcastle upon Tyne, North Tyneside, South Tyneside and Sunderland:

- List of schools in Gateshead
- List of schools in Newcastle Upon Tyne
- List of schools in North Tyneside
- List of schools in South Tyneside
- List of schools in Sunderland
