= Bensham =

Human settlement in Gateshead, England

Coordinates: 54°57′00″N 1°36′37″W

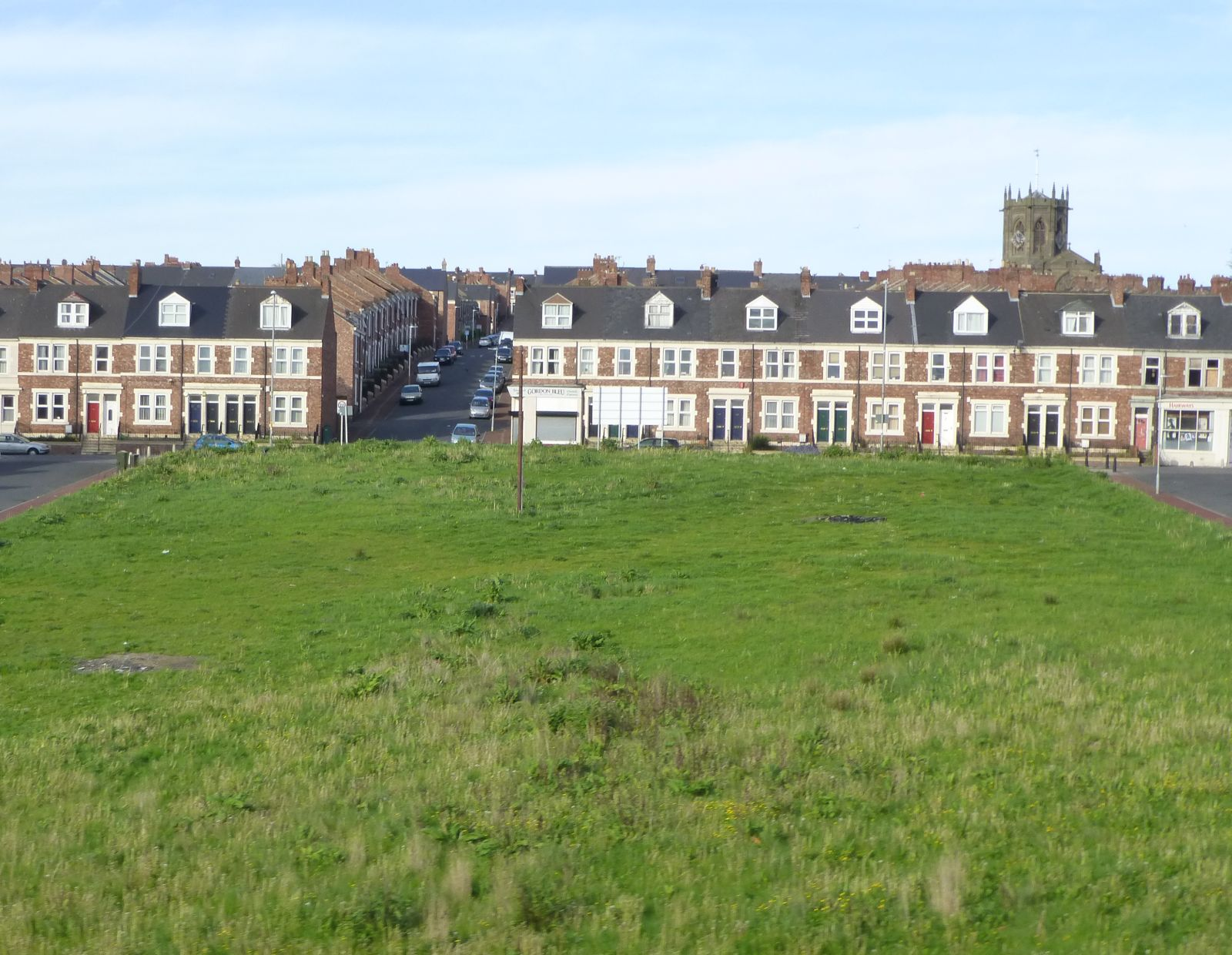
- Green space, terraces and St Chad's

- Location within Tyne and Wear
- Population: 10,638 (2011 Census data for Lobley Hill and Bensham)
- OS grid reference: NZ249625
- Metropolitan borough: Gateshead
- Metropolitan county: Tyne and Wear
- Region: North East
- Country: England
- Sovereign state: United Kingdom
- Post town: GATESHEAD
- Postcode district: NE8
- Dialling code: 0191
- Police: Northumbria
- Fire: Tyne and Wear
- Ambulance: North East
- UK Parliament: Gateshead Central and Whickham

Bensham is a suburban area in the Metropolitan Borough of Gateshead, Tyne and Wear, England. The area consists mainly of residential properties, with a range of predominantly terraced housing, built between the late 1890s and the 1980s.

== Toponymy ==
The name of Bensham is first attested in 1249, as Benchelm. This name is generally thought to come from the Old English words benc ("bench", perhaps used metaphorically of a topographical feature such as a ledge or bench-shaped hill) and helm (used in north-country place-names to mean "cattle-shelter"). If so the name once meant something like "cattle-shelter at the bench-shaped hill". However, the earliest serious researcher of the name, Allen Mawer, viewed it as "a difficult name", emphasised uncertainty about the second element, and also suggested that "the first element may be" a personal name, "Be(o)rnic, a diminutive of Be(o)rn", or that the element might come from the regional name Bernicia.

== Community ==
Like nearby Saltwell, the area is home to a sizeable community of Orthodox Haredi Jews. The Gateshead Talmudical College, founded in 1929, is one of the largest yeshiva for Jewish education in Europe. The area has affectionately earned the nickname "Little Jerusalem" by locals.

The most recent chief rabbi, Shraga Feivel Zimmerman, served between 2008 and 2020.

The roof of a flat in Bensham was torn off by extreme winds during storm Malik as it battered the North East of England in January 2022.

== Demography ==
The data below shows that 51.0% of the population in the Lobley Hill and Bensham electoral ward are male, and 49.0% are female. This compares similarly with both the average in the Metropolitan Borough of Gateshead, as well as the national average.

A total of 6.1% of the population were from a black, Asian and minority ethnic (BAME) group in Lobley Hill and Bensham. This figure is higher than that of the average in Gateshead (3.7%), but lower than the national average (14.6%).

Data from the Office for National Statistics found that the average life expectancy in the Lobley Hill and Bensham electoral ward is 75.0 years for men, and 80.3 years for women. These statistics compare less than favourably for both men and women, when compared to the average life expectancy in the North East of England, of 77.4 and 81.4 years, for men and women respectively.

A total of 55.9% of households in Lobley Hill and Bensham have access to at least one car. This figure is significantly lower than both the average in Gateshead (63.5%), as well as the national average (74.2%).

Demography (data from 2011 Census)
Demographic	% of population Lobley Hill and Bensham	% of population Gateshead	% of population England
Total	10,638	200,214	53,012,456
Male	51.0%	48.9%	49.2%
Female	49.0%	51.1%	50.8%
BAME	6.1%	3.7%	14.6%
Age 65+	15.6%	17.6%	16.4%

== Governance ==
Lobley Hill and Bensham is a local council ward in the Metropolitan Borough of Gateshead. This ward covers an area of around 1.5 square miles (3.9 km^{2}), and has a population of 10,638.

As of September 2020, the ward is served by three councillors: Catherine Donovan, Eileen McMaster and Kevin Dodds.

The village is located within the parliamentary constituency of Gateshead Central and Whickham, and is served by Labour Party Member of Parliament (MP), Mark Ferguson.

Gateshead Council Local Elections 2019: Lobley Hill and Bensham
Candidate	Political party	Total votes	% of votes
Eileen McMaster	Labour	963	49.0%
Nicholas James Seaborn	Liberal Democrats	345	17.5%
Andy Redfern	Green	288	14.6%
Janice Marina Hutchinson	Conservative	266	13.5%
Jonathan Mohammed	Independent	104	5.3%

== Transport ==
=== Air ===
The nearest airport is Newcastle International Airport, which is located around 9 miles (14 km) away. Teesside International Airport and Carlisle Lake District Airport are located around 37 and 55 miles (60 and 89 km) away.

=== Bus ===
Bensham Road is a well-served bus corridor, providing a regular service to Gateshead and Newcastle upon Tyne.

=== Rail ===
The nearest National Rail station is Newcastle, which is located on the East Coast Main Line. A former station on the East Coast Main Line served the area between 1868 and 1954.

=== Road ===
Bensham is located near to the A1 and A167. By road, Gateshead can be reached in around 5 minutes, Newcastle upon Tyne in 10 minutes, and Newcastle International Airport in 20 minutes.

== See also ==
- Deckham
- Lobley Hill
- Saltwell
- Saltwell Park
