= River Don, Tyne and Wear =

River in Tyne and Wear, England

River Don
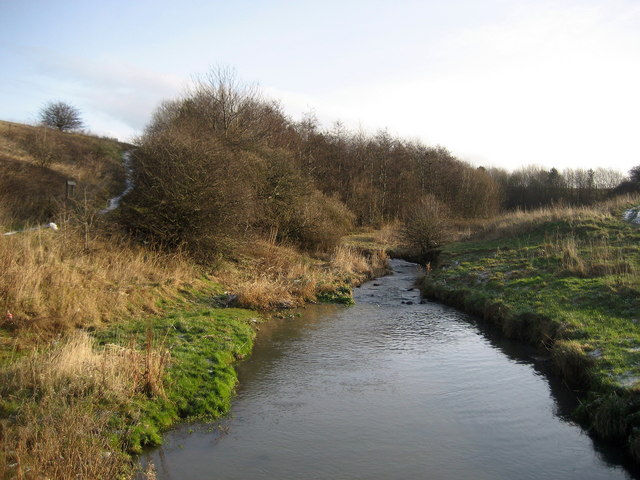
- Don near Boldon Colliery

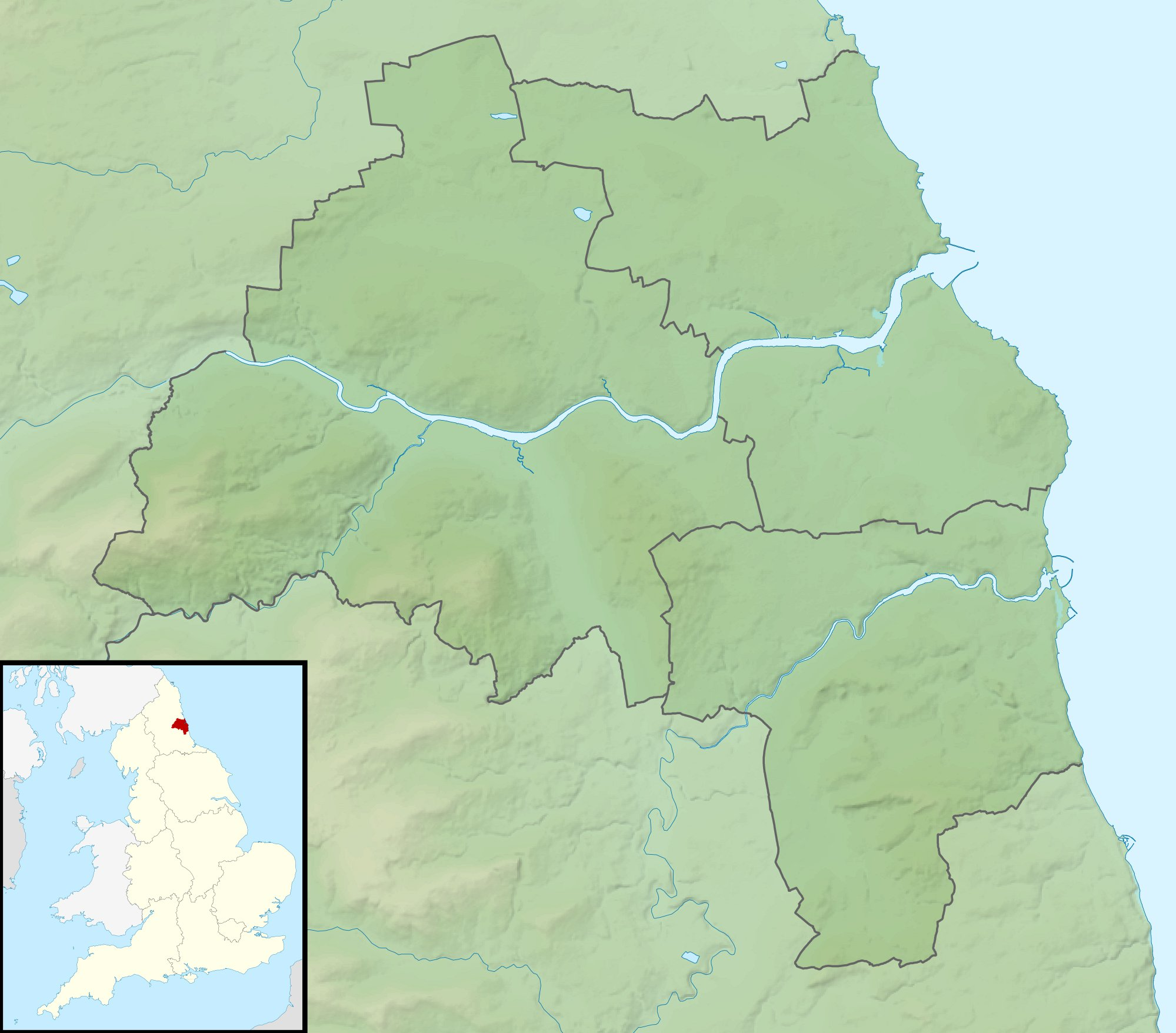
- Location of the mouth within Tyne and Wear

Location
- Country: England
- County: Tyne and Wear; County Durham (historical)

Physical characteristics
- Source
  - location: Springwell
- Mouth
  - location: River Tyne at Jarrow
  - coordinates: 54.986114°N 1.472084°W
- Length: 15.4 km (9.6 mi)
- Basin size: 42.7 km^{2} (16.5 sq mi)

Basin features
- Tributaries
  - left: Bede's Burn, Monkton Burn, Calfclose Burn
  - right: Whittle Burn

The River Don is a 15.4 kilometres (9.6 mi) long tributary of the River Tyne in Tyne and Wear, North East England.

It rises near Springwell and flows east for about 6 km, then turns north. At the Brockley Whins Metro station, it flows through a culvert before flowing out at Monkton. It flows under the Jarrow Bridge and meets the River Tyne at Jarrow. For much of its length in the upper section, it is the boundary between Gateshead and Sunderland.

Tributaries of the Don includes the Bede's Burn, Monkton Burn, Calfclose Burn, Station Burn, Usworth Burn, and Whittle Burn.

The River Don's mouth was altered in the mid-20th century, and a remnant still remains to the old course near the mouth.

== See also ==
- List of rivers of England
