= Gateshead (disambiguation) =

Gateshead is a town in Tyne and Wear, England.

Gateshead may also refer to:

- Metropolitan Borough of Gateshead, a district of Tyne and Wear, England, formed in 1974
- Gateshead (constituency), England
- Gateshead railway station, a closed station in Tyne and Wear, England
- Gateshead, New South Wales, suburb of Greater Newcastle, Australia
- Gateshead Hall, fictional place from Jane Eyre
