= Bensham railway station =

Disused railway station in Bensham, Gateshead

Bensham
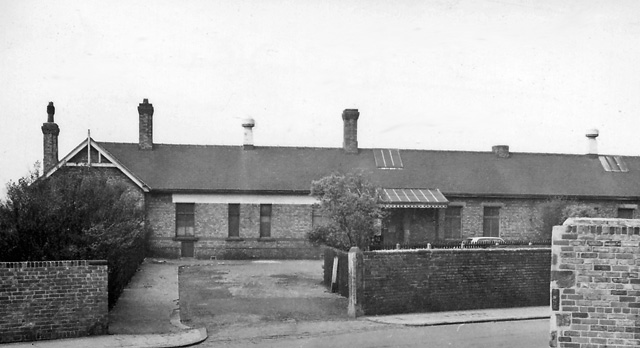
- The station in 1965

General information
- Location: Bensham, Gateshead; England
- Coordinates: 54.95240°N 1.61946°W
- Grid reference: NZ244619
- Platforms: 2

Other information
- Status: Disused

History
- Original company: North Eastern Railway
- Pre-grouping: North Eastern Railway
- Post-grouping: London and North Eastern Railway

Key dates
- 1 December 1868: Opened
- 5 April 1954: Closed
Location

Bensham Railway Station was a railway station serving the Bensham area of Gateshead in Tyne and Wear, England. It opened in 1868 and closed in 1954.

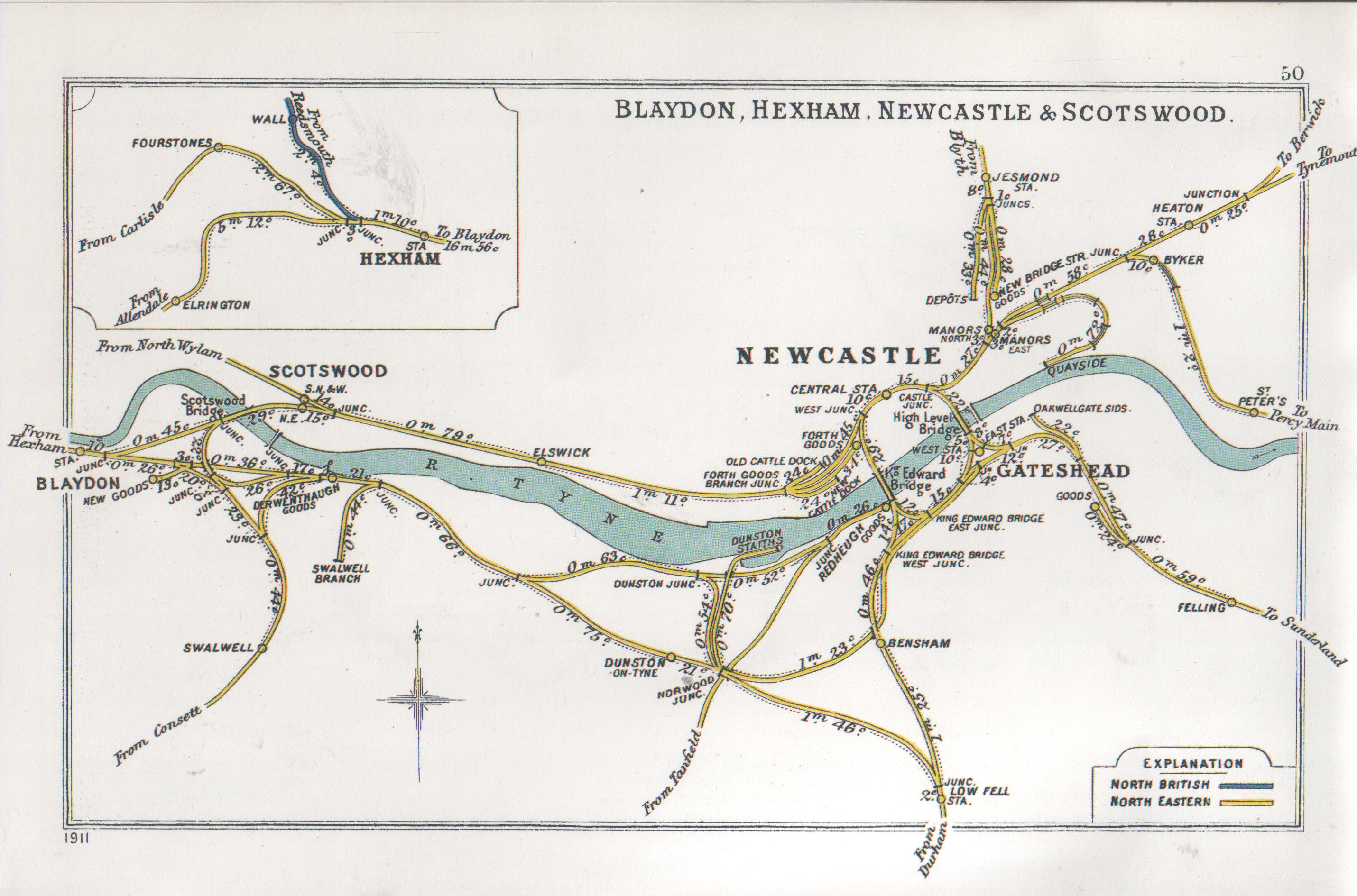
A 1911 Railway Clearing House Junction Diagram showing railways around Newcastle and Gateshead, including Bensham (bottom right)

Preceding station	Historical railways	Following station
Low Fell; Line open, station closed	North Eastern Railway; Team Valley Line	Gateshead; Line open, station closed
