= St Chad's Church, Bensham =

Saint Chad's Church
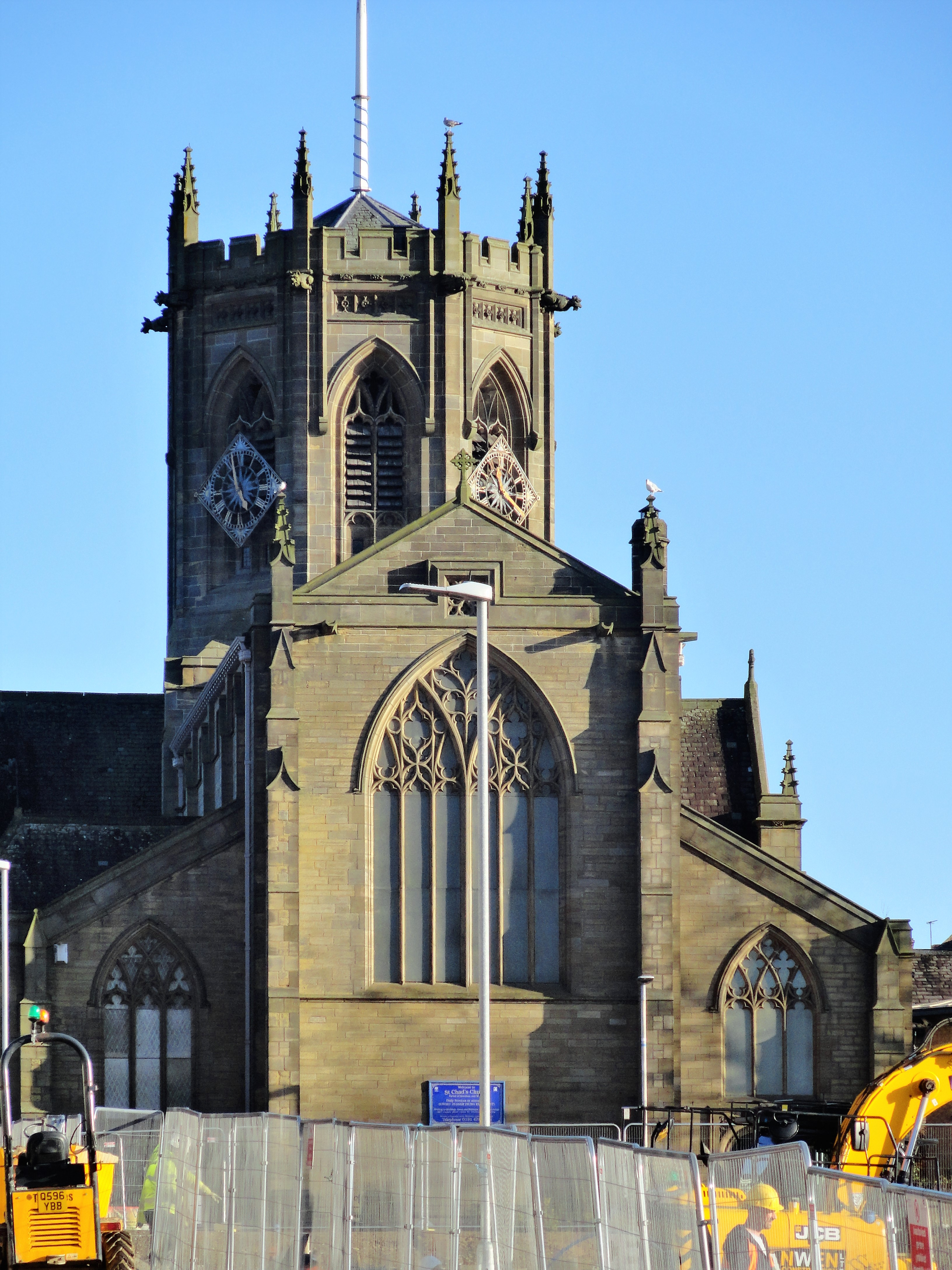
- Saint Chad's Church
- 54°56′57″N 1°36′42″W
- OS grid reference: NZ 24971 61700
- Location: Rawling Road; Bensham; Gateshead
- Country: England
- Denomination: Anglican

History
- Dedication: Parish church

Architecture
- Functional status: Active
- Heritage designation: Grade II*
- Designated: 1903
- Architect: William Searle Hicks
- Architectural type: Church
- Style: Arts and Crafts; Decorated / Perpendicular Gothic (revival)
- Construction cost: £26,000

Administration
- Diocese: Durham
- Archdeaconry: Sunderland
- Parish: Bensham and Teams

Listed Building – Grade II*
- Official name: Church of St Chad
- Designated: 13 January 1983
- Reference no.: 1277841

St Chad's Church or Church of St Chad is an Anglican parish church in Bensham, Gateshead and a Grade II* listed building. It is a landmark visible from the East Coast Mainline and combines Arts and Crafts and late English Gothic revival architecture.

== History ==
As of the 1890s, the area around Bensham was mostly rural before quickly urbanising at the turn of the 20th century with the building of Tyneside flats to house workers. Walter James MP provided land for a new church designed by architect William Searle Hicks. The reported cost was £26,000, expensive for the time; the project received funding from Emily Matilda Easton of Nest House and West Layton Manor, whose brothers James and Thomas ran Oakwellgate Colliery. His final design before his death in 1902, Searle Hicks was influenced by the Arts and Crafts movement, which he blended with late English Gothic (Decorative and Perpendicular) in his design. Construction began in 1900, and St Chad's was consecrated in 1903.

Apropos of its towering proportions, St Chad's earned the nickname "Cathedral for the Working People". The parish describes itself as "Liturgically and theologically influenced by the Oxford Movement" and liberal in outlook. It is a member of the Gateshead Deanery, part of Churches Together.

In the 1990s, the west end of the nave was sectioned off to be used as a community centre in the form of a Child and Family Project, which had previously been housed in a different building on the site.

The church underwent re-roofing repairs in 2016 and 2021.

== Features ==
St Chad's identifying feature from afar is the octagonal tower in the middle of its cruciform, which lights up at night and can be viewed from the East Coast Mainline (ECML). The building was constructed using sandstone as well as green Westmorland slates for the roofing.

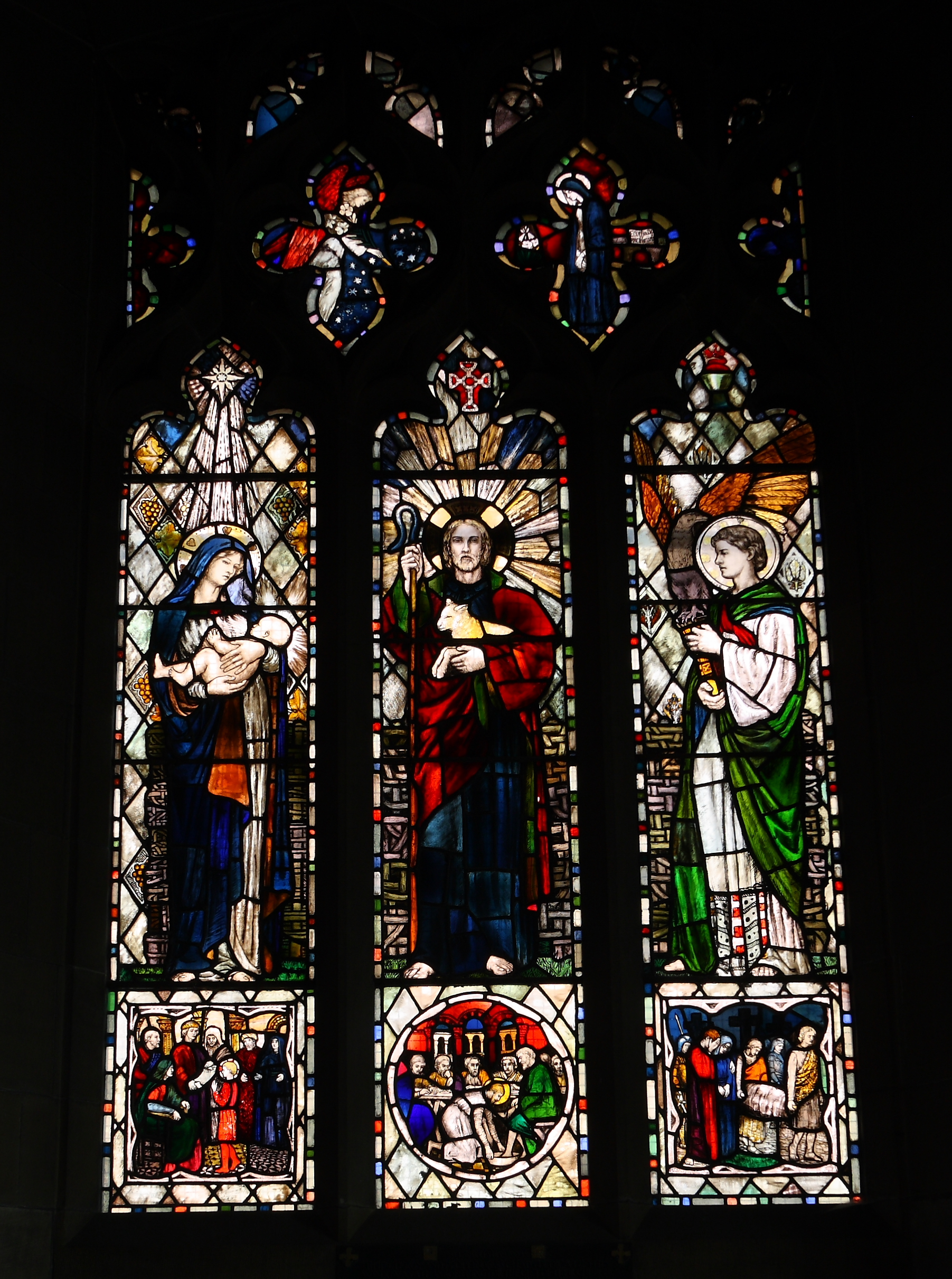
Stained glass

The bespoke silverware on the altar was crafted by William Bainbridge Reynolds. St Chad's also features woodcarvings by Ralph Hedley. The stained glass windows are attributed to Caroline Townshend and Laurence Walker
