= Juvenile jazz band =

Type of children's marching band in England

Juvenile jazz bands are a type of children's marching band that started in the 20th century almost exclusively in working-class mining areas of the North of England and the Midlands, with a few bands in the mining areas of Wales. Historically, the bands originated in the tradition of coal miners' union marches and colliery brass bands. It was felt that the children should be allowed to participate, and the earliest bands were the children's section of trade union parades. They form an important part of British working-class culture.

The instruments used are usually kazoos, glockenspiel, and drums.

Jazz bands using massed kazoos are mentioned as early as 1919 by Lord Baden-Powell in his Chief Scout Yarns. Juvenile jazz bands were common in the Midlands in the 1930s and possibly earlier, featuring in footage of the Castlefields Meteor Jazz Band in film of Shrewsbury's Coronation celebrations in 1937. There was a resurgence of interest in the 1950s, enjoyed a heyday in the 70s and 80s, but numbers have dwindled recently.

The juvenile jazz band, the Pelaw Hussars, famously appeared in the film Get Carter.

There is still an organization named the United Kingdom Federation of Jazz Bands, (UKFJB) which oversees and organizes competitions between the various bands at a national level.

A new organisation was formed at the beginning of 2019 under the title Marching Band Association United Kingdom (MBAUK) after a number of bands became disillusioned with the UKFJB.
