= Saltwell, Tyne and Wear =

Saltwell
- Population: 9,659 (2011, Gateshead ward)
- Metropolitan borough: Gateshead
- Metropolitan county: Tyne and Wear
- Region: North East
- Country: England
- Sovereign state: United Kingdom
- Post town: GATESHEAD
- Postcode district: NE8
- Dialling code: 0191
- Police: Northumbria
- Fire: Tyne and Wear
- Ambulance: North East
- UK Parliament: Gateshead Central and Whickham

Saltwell is a district of central Gateshead, Tyne and Wear directly south of the town centre. The area had a population of 9,659 in 2011 and contains Saltwell Park and the Saltwell Towers. The area is also multicultural, being home to large and expanding Jewish and Muslim communities.

== Local area ==
Saltwell has many local amenities such as Saltwell Park in the south of the district along with the Gateshead Library, the Shipley Art Gallery and Gateshead Leisure Centre.

== Geography ==
Saltwell lies on relatively flat land in North East England, 255 miles north-northwest of London, one mile south of Newcastle upon Tyne and ten miles northwest of Sunderland.

== Demography ==
Saltwell had a population of 9,659 in 2011, more than the 2001 figure of 8,141.

Saltwell compared 2011
Ethnic origin	Saltwell	Gateshead
White British	80.5%	92.0%
Asian	5.3%	2.5%
Black	1.5%	0.8%

In 2011, 19.5% of Saltwell's population was non White British compared with 8.1% in 2001. Saltwell is the second most ethnically diverse ward in the Metropolitan Borough of Gateshead and the town of Gateshead, with slightly less ethnic minorities than the Bridges ward but Saltwell has a larger Jewish community.
