= Jarrow Bridge =

Single-arch bridge over the River Don, Tyne and Wear

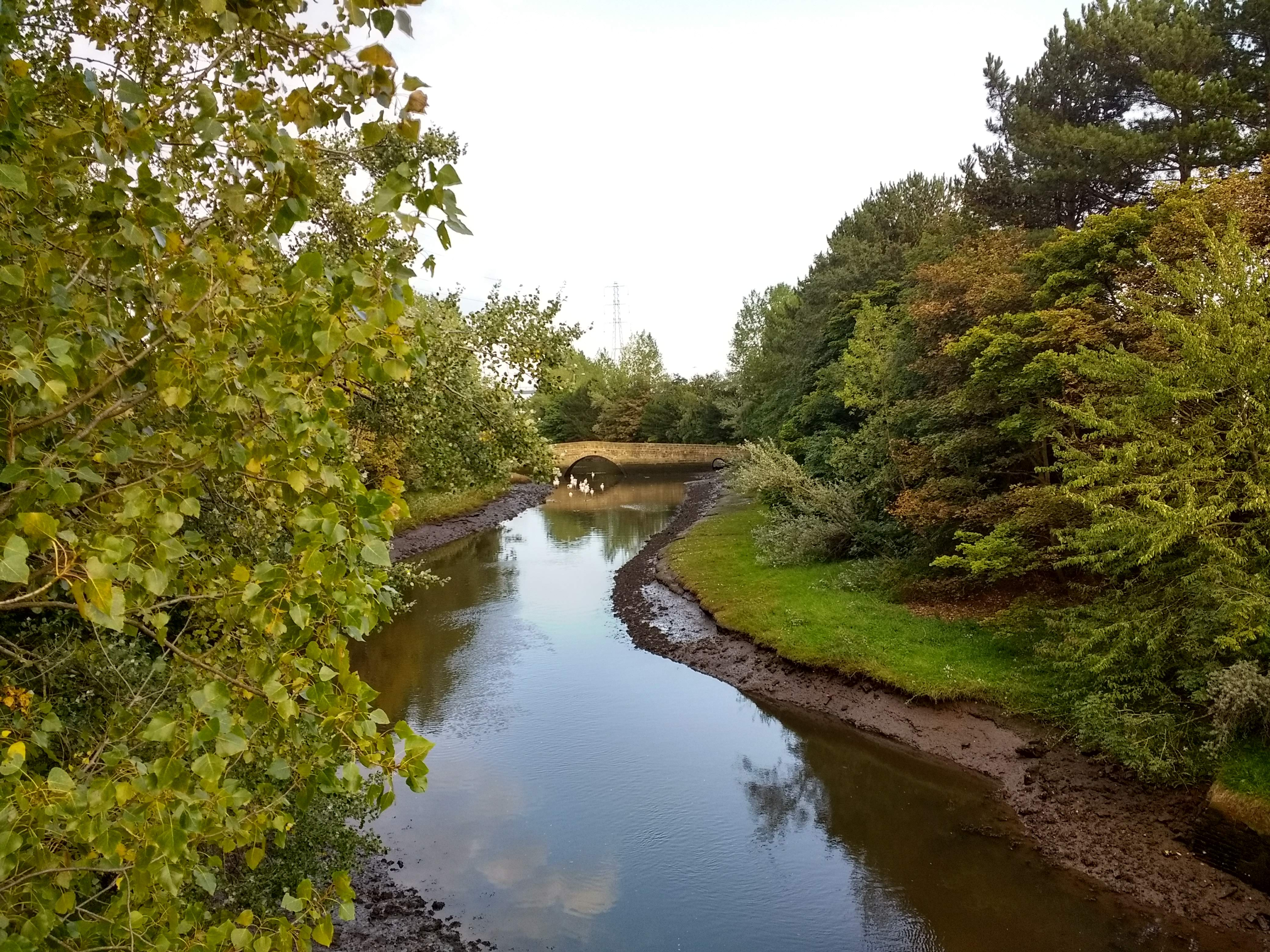
- Coordinates: 54°58′47″N 1°28′17″W
- OS grid reference: NZ3393665135
- Crosses: River Don
- Owner: South Tyneside Council
- Maintained by: South Tyneside Council
- Heritage status: Grade II listed building
- National Heritage List for England: 1355092

Jarrow Bridge (or previously, Don Bridge) is a bridge in Jarrow, South Tyneside, England. Built from stone in the early 18th century, it previously carried the main road from South Shields to Jarrow across the River Don. It is registered as a grade II listed building.

== Location ==
The bridge served St Paul's Church on the north side. The south side now leads to an industrial estate and is blocked off.

== Construction ==
The present bridge was built in the early 18th century. It was repaired sometime between 1781 and 1783 by William Allison, and from 1805 work was carried out to widen the bridge.

== Explosion ==
On 21 May 1921 a bomb was planted by members of the IRA on the bridge, which subsequently exploded, causing a hole "18 inches by 18" in the gas main. The attack was carried out by John Ward and Martin Flaherty of Jarrow (A Company).

== Restoration ==
The bridge was restored in 1998-9 by South Tyneside Council with a grant from the National Lottery Heritage Fund of £115300.
