= Springwell Estate =

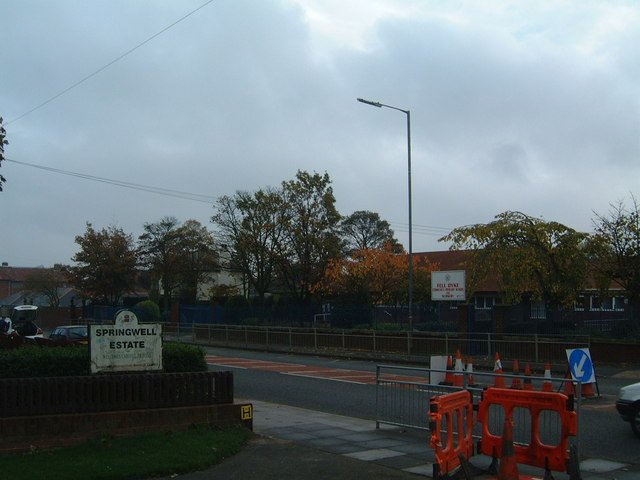

- Location in Tyne and Wear

General information
- Location: Tyne and Wear, England, UK
- Coordinates: 54.931°N 1.564°W
- OS grid: NZ279596

Springwell Estate is a council estate located in the eastern part of Wrekenton in Gateshead, England.
