= Wrekenton =

Coordinates: 54.93°N 1.57°W

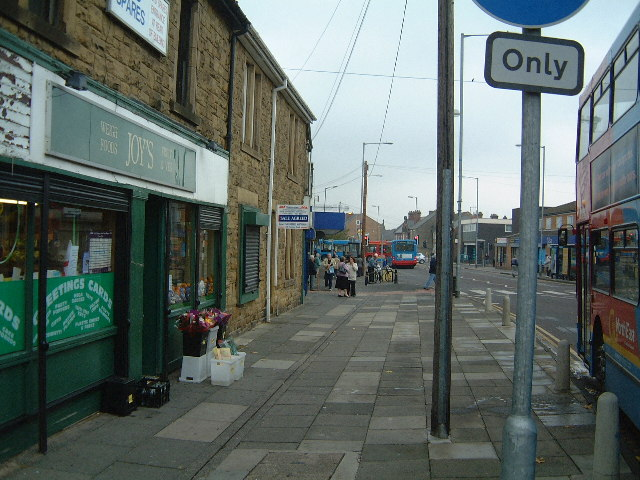
- Wrekenton high street

- Location within Tyne and Wear
- Population: 6,110 (2011 Census data for High Fell ward)
- OS grid reference: NZ 2765 5914
- Metropolitan borough: Gateshead
- Metropolitan county: Tyne and Wear
- Region: North East
- Country: England
- Sovereign state: United Kingdom
- Post town: GATESHEAD
- Postcode district: NE9
- Dialling code: 0191
- Police: Northumbria
- Fire: Tyne and Wear
- Ambulance: North East
- UK Parliament: Gateshead Central and Whickham & Washington and Gateshead South

Wrekenton is a residential area in Gateshead, located around 3.5 miles (5.6 km) from Newcastle upon Tyne, 11 miles (18 km) from Sunderland, and 14 miles (23 km) from Durham. In 2011, Census data for the Gateshead Metropolitan Borough Council ward of High Fell recorded a total population of 6,110.

Wrekenton is bordered by Beacon Lough to the north, Harlow Green to the west, and Eighton Banks to the south. A large part of Wrekenton consists of a council estate, known as Springwell Estate. This is distinct from Springwell Village, which is located a short distance across the border, within the City of Sunderland.

== History ==
The antiquarian John Hodgson claimed to have named the village. He wrote, "After the enclosure of the common (in 1822), Mr. Watson, of Warburton Place, Carrhill, founded a considerable village at this place, which, at my suggestion, he called Wrekenton." This name was chosen because Wrekenton and Eighton Banks were divided by the remains of the Wrekendyke Roman road. Wrekenton is believed to have been the meeting point of two Roman roads, Cade's Road and the Wrekendyke Road. Cade's Road ran from the Humber to York and Newcastle, with the Wrekendyke Road branching away to the north east passing close to Jarrow, and ending at the Roman fort and harbour of Arbeia, at South Shields. It has even been conjectured that a Roman fort existed at the site now occupied by the Ravensworth Golf Club, but no evidence for this has been found.

In the 1860s, Wrekenton was still a very small village with about two hundred dwellings. It remained so for a further seventy years until slum clearance in Gateshead resulted in many new houses being built in Wrekenton, in order to accommodate the previous slum-dwellers. The main industries of the area surrounding the village during the nineteenth century were coal mining, quarrying, brickmaking and agriculture. The spelling of the town's name is recorded, in the mid 1890s, as "Wreckenton", which survived as the name of the local council ward serving the area until 1981.

Old Durham Road was the main route between Durham and Newcastle until 1827, when a new road was built to the west of it on lower ground and called Durham Road. Old Durham Road climbed the steep bank, known as Long Bank to Wrekenton and from there headed north to Beacon Lough before dropping down the steep bank into Gateshead. The mail coach used to pass along this road and one of the stopping places for the coach was The Coach and Horses, an inn that still exists today. Other equally old public houses in Wrekenton, dating from the nineteenth century, are The Seven Stars and The Ship.

== Demography ==
According to the 2011 Census, the High Fell ward has a population of 6,110. 51.7% of the population are female, while 48.3% are male. Only 3.4% of the population were from a black, Asian and minority ethnic (BAME) group, as opposed to 14.6% of the national population, and 3.7% of the population in the Metropolitan Borough of Gateshead.

Data from the 2011 Census found that the average life expectancy in High Fell is 75.0 years for men, and 78.7 years for women. These statistics compare less than favourable, when compared to the average life expectancy in the North East of England, of 77.4 and 81.4 years, respectively.

Car ownership is significantly lower than the average in the Metropolitan Borough of Gateshead (63.5%), and the national average of 74.2% – with 51.5% of households in the High Fell ward owning at least one car.

Demography (data from 2011 Census)
Demographic	% of population Wrekenton	% of population Gateshead	% of population England
Total population	6,110	200,214	53,012,456
Male	48.3%	48.9%	49.2%
Female	51.7%	51.1%	50.8%
BAME	3.4%	3.7%	14.6%
Age 65+	15.8%	17.6%	16.4%

== Education ==
Wrekenton is served by two primary schools: Fell Dyke Community Primary School, which was rated "requires improvement" by Ofsted in March 2019, and St. Oswald's Catholic Primary School, which was rated "good" in May 2013.

In terms of secondary education, Wrekenton is located within the catchment area for Cardinal Hume Catholic School, rated "outstanding" by Ofsted in May 2024, as well as Lord Lawson of Beamish Academy in Birtley, which was rated "requires improvement" by Ofsted in June 2019. Students also attend the nearby Grace College (formerly known as Joseph Swan Academy).

== Governance ==
High Fell is a local council ward in the Metropolitan Borough of Gateshead. This ward covers an area of around 0.9 square miles (2.3 km^{2}), and has a population of 6,110. As of April 2020, the ward is served by three councillors: Judith Gibson, Jean Lee and Jennifer Reay. Wrekenton is located within the parliamentary constituency of Gateshead. As of April 2020, the constituency is served by MP Ian Mearns.

Gateshead Council Local Elections 2019: High Fell
Candidate	Political party	No. of votes	% of votes
Jennifer Reay	Labour	828	56.4%
Edward Bohill	Conservative	187	12.7%
Lynda Ann Duggan	Liberal Democrats	178	12.1%
Heather Rosemary White	Save Us Now	142	9.7%
Elaine Brunskill	Socialist Alternative	133	9.1%

== Transport ==
=== Air ===
The nearest airport to Wrekenton is Newcastle International Airport, which is located around 14 miles (23 km) away by road. Teesside International Airport and Carlisle Lake District Airport are located around 33.5 and 59 miles (53.9 and 95.0 km) away by road, respectively.

=== Bus ===
Wrekenton is served by Go North East's local bus services, with frequent routes serving Newcastle upon Tyne, Gateshead, Sunderland and Washington and County Durham.

=== Rail ===
The nearest Tyne and Wear Metro station is located at Gateshead. The Tyne and Wear Metro provides a regular service to Newcastle, with trains running up to every 6 minutes (7–8 minutes during the evening and Sunday) between Pelaw and South Gosforth, increasing to up to every 3 minutes at peak times. Heworth is nearest rail station, with Northern Trains providing an hourly service along the Durham Coast Line.

=== Road ===
Wrekenton is served by the B1296 – a part of the former route of the Great North Road. By road, Gateshead can be reached in under 10 minutes, Newcastle in 15 minutes, and Newcastle International Airport in 30 minutes.

=== Sports ===
Wrekenton is home to the non-league football club "Wrekenton Blue Star" who compete in the Northern Alliance as part of the English pyramid football system.
