= Lord Lawson of Beamish Academy =

Location
- Birtley Lane; Chester-le-Street, County Durham, DH3 2LP; England; 54°53′34″N 1°34′14″W

Information
- Type: Academy
- Motto: 'Each other...and our dreams'
- Local authority: Gateshead
- Department for Education URN: 137942 Tables
- Ofsted: Reports
- Principal: Andrew Fowler
- Gender: Coeducational
- Age: 11 to 18
- Enrolment: 1,800
- Website: lordlawson.academy

Lord Lawson of Beamish Academy (formerly Lord Lawson of Beamish Community School) is a coeducational secondary school and sixth form located in the town of Birtley in the Gateshead area of Tyne and Wear, England. It was first opened to pupils in the early 1970s and was rebuilt in September 2007. The new building was constructed by Sir Robert McAlpine.

Previously a community school administered by Gateshead Metropolitan Borough Council, in March 2012 Lord Lawson of Beamish Community School converted to academy status and was renamed Lord Lawson of Beamish Academy.

The school's principal is Andrew Fowler who began his headship in June 2019. It was most recently inspected by Ofsted in November 2022 where it was assigned a 'Good' grading (or 4/5 stars) in all areas of the framework.

== Jack Lawson ==
The school is named after Jack Lawson, an influential British trade unionist and Labour politician, serving as Secretary of State for War during the 1940s. Consequently, the school has been associated with left-wing politics, particularly relating to its connections to the mining industry and trade unionism, as well as Lawson's refusal to join Ramsay MacDonald's National Government due to his reluctance to work alongside Conservatives. The school motto, "each other...and our dreams", is a quotation from Lawson's autobiography, A Man's Life.

== Subjects and courses ==
Between year 7–9 students study a range non-optional subjects including, but not limited to: English, Mathematics, Science, History, IT, Geography, French, German and Art.

In year 10 students are given the opportunity to drop certain subjects and take on new subjects e.g. Graphic Design, whilst core-subjects such as Maths and English are still mandatory requirements.

In Sixth Form students are given the chance to study between 3 and 5 subjects which include ECDL courses.

== Sixth form ==
The sixth form is led by a Head of Sixth Form, Mrs. Jordan and a Director of Post-15 Education, Miss. Nellist.

Ofsted noted in their most recent report that “The effectiveness of the Sixth Form is good and the vast majority of students go onto higher education, training, or employment.” They also reported that “Students are well known and the courses they take are well matched to their needs.” The sixth form was given a grade 'good' whilst the main school achieved a rating of 'requires improvement'

At the end of Year 13, a leaver's ball is usually held at Lumley Castle, attended by both pupils and staff.

== Extension ==
An extension to Lord Lawson was completed in April 2014. It includes an independent learning centre, designed for sixth form students. The construction was carried out by Sir Robert McAlpine and Pinnacle Schools. The extension is expected to accommodate eight further class rooms.

== Notable former pupils ==
- Tommy Johnson, English footballer, played for Aston Villa in the 1994 League Cup Final
- Gary Madine, English footballer, last played for Blackpool F.C.
- Gary Owers, English footballer, played for Sunderland in the 1992 FA Cup Final
- Bryan Robson, English footballer, and former captain of national team.
