= St Joseph's Catholic Academy =

Location
- Mill Lane; Hebburn, South Tyneside, NE31 2ET; England; 54°57′35″N 1°31′21″W

Information
- Type: Academy
- Motto: Caritas Christi Urget Nos; 2 Corinthians 5:14; The Love of Christ Spurs Us On
- Religious affiliation: Roman Catholic
- Established: 1959 (officially opened in 1960)
- Department for Education URN: 139878 Tables
- Ofsted: Reports
- Executive Headteacher: J Crowe
- Staff: 157
- Gender: Coeducational
- Age: 11 to 18
- Enrolment: 1536
- Houses: Aidan, Bede, Cuthbert, Dunstan Elflada and Hilda
- Colours: Royal Blue and Gold
- Former name: St. Joseph's Grammar Technical School (1959-74), St Joseph's RC Comprehensive School (1974-2013)
- Diocese: Hexham and Newcastle
- Website: http://www.stjosephs.uk.net/

St Joseph's Catholic Academy (formerly St Joseph's RC Comprehensive School) is a coeducational Roman Catholic secondary school with academy status, located in Hebburn, South Tyneside, England.

The school currently caters for students aged 11 to 18 and also a number of vocational courses. It is one of a number of secondary schools in the local authority area that has a sixth form.

The school is on the B1306, near the A185 junction, in the south of Hebburn, one mile north of the terminus of the A194(M). It is on the district boundary with Gateshead. Further down Mill Lane until 1992 was the Monkton Coke Works.

== History ==
The school opened as St. Joseph's Grammar Technical School in 1959, being officially opened on 9 June 1960 by James Cunningham, the Bishop of Hexham and Newcastle. It was a grammar school with a technical focus (similar to a technical school) for catholic children in the north of County Durham, and the County Borough of South Shields. Further grammar technical schools were to be opened in Gateshead, Lanchester, Stockton and Whitley Bay.

St Joseph's became a comprehensive in 1974 when it merged with the neighbouring St James' RC Secondary Modern School, which was on the same site. The school gained specialist Technology College status in 1996.

The school converted to academy status in July 2013 and was renamed St Joseph's Catholic Academy. The Bede Block (PE department) of the school was opened by former England footballer Peter Beardsley MBE.

== Academic performance ==
The school performs well above the local authority average and currently holds the best GCSE and AS/A level scores in South Tyneside, with 84% of its students reaching grades A*-C at GCSE and an average AS/A level point score of 645.9. The academic achievement, vocational and pastoral targets of the school was recognised by the DfES in the award of "Leading Edge" status in September 2003. An Ofsted report credited the students for "exemplary behaviour in lessons and throughout the school".

At GCSE in 2010, the school came second in the local authority area, above the England average and second to another faith school, Whitburn Church of England Academy in Whitburn.

== Notable former pupils ==
- Josef Craig, Team GB S8 Swimmer, gold medalist in the 400m freestyle S7 at the 2012 Summer Paralympics
- Emma Lewell-Buck, Labour MP since 2013 for South Shields
- Rob Orton, DJ remixer and music producer
- Craig Russell (footballer), Sunderland AFC

=== St. Joseph's RC Grammar Technical School ===
- David Almond, children's writer
- Phil Brown, football manager
- Eddie Edgar, goalkeeper for Hartlepool United in the late 1970s
- Peter Flannery, writer, who wrote Our Friends in the North in 1982
- Brendan Foster CBE, 10,000 and 5,000 metre runner, 1974 BBC Sports Personality of the Year, and Chancellor from 2005-2009 of Leeds Metropolitan University
- George Irving, actor who played Anton Meyer in Holby City
- Aidan McCaffery, central defender
