= Heworth Grange School =

Academy in Tyne and Wear, England

Location
- High Lanes; Felling; Gateshead, Tyne and Wear, NE10 0PT; England; 54.9479°N 1.5516°W

Information
- Type: Academy
- Local authority: Gateshead
- Trust: Consilium Academies
- Department for Education URN: 145490 Tables
- Ofsted: Reports
- Headteacher: Neil Rodgers
- Gender: Coeducational
- Age: 11 to 16
- Enrolment: 1,001 (as of 2024)
- Website: heworthgrange.org

Heworth Grange School (formerly Heworth Grange Comprehensive School) is a coeducational secondary school located in Felling (near Gateshead) in Tyne and Wear, England.

== History ==
=== 1988 arson attack ===
There was an arson attack on the morning of 18 July 1988. It cost £1m, being caused by 18 year old Julie Orr. 70 firemen attended, and the fire destroyed twelve classrooms including English and Maths.

=== Incidents ===
In December 1998, a student died of brain damage following a playground fight. A 15-year-old was eventually acquitted of his manslaughter at Newcastle Crown Court.

=== Mergers ===
There were proposals to merge the school with Thomas Hepburn Community School. however such plans were curbed in the early stages. Initially the sixth form merged with Thomas Hepburn school but that ended with the closure of the partner school.

Heworth Grange Comprehensive School was the first in the North East to be awarded funds under the Building Schools for the Future scheme. The Science and technology block was completed in 2011 and the new Entrance block which contains admin and dining and refurbishment of arts facilities was completed in March 2012. The older of the two sports halls was refurbished in December 2012.

Previously a community school administered by Gateshead Metropolitan Borough Council, in February 2018 Heworth Grange Comprehensive School converted to academy status and was renamed Heworth Grange School. The school is now sponsored by Consilium Academies.

Heworth Grange previously operated a sixth form provision, but this has been discontinued as from 2020/21.

=== Awards and achievements ===
- Princess Diana Memorial Award, for charitable work
- Healthy Schools Award
- Artsmark Gold award (Since 2006 and ongoing)

== Notable former pupils ==
- Kieran Reilly, BMX rider
