= Cardinal Hume Catholic School =

Location
- Old Durham Road; Beacon Lough; Tyne and Wear, NE9 6RZ; England
- Coordinates: 54.9308°N 1.5767°W

Information
- Type: Academy
- Religious affiliation: Roman Catholic
- Local authority: Gateshead
- Trust: Bishop Wilkinson Catholic Education Trust
- Department for Education URN: 137852 Tables
- Ofsted: Reports
- Head Teacher: B. Robson
- Gender: Coeducational
- Age: 11 to 18
- Houses: Oswald, Aidan, Bede, Cuthbert, Hild
- Website: http://www.cardinalhume.com/

Cardinal Hume Catholic School is a coeducational secondary school and sixth form located in the Beacon Lough area of Gateshead, Tyne and Wear, England. It is named after Basil Cardinal Hume, a former President of the Catholic Bishops' Conference of England and Wales.

== History ==
Previously a voluntary aided school administered by Gateshead Metropolitan Borough Council, Cardinal Hume Catholic School converted to academy status on 1 February 2012. The school is supported by the Roman Catholic Diocese of Hexham and Newcastle but coordinates with Gateshead Metropolitan Borough Council for admissions.

In July 2019, it was named as a computing hub for the National Centre for Computing Education.

== Curriculum ==
Cardinal Hume Catholic School offers GCSEs and BTECs as programmes of study for pupils, while students in the sixth form have the option to study from a range of A-levels, Cambridge Technicals and further BTECs.
