= Tyne and Wear Fire and Rescue Service =

Fire and rescue service in England

- Badge of TWFRS

Operational area
- Country: England
- Metropolitan county: Tyne and Wear
- Metropolitan boroughs: Newcastle upon Tyne; Gateshead; North Tyneside; South Tyneside; Sunderland

Agency overview
- Established: 1 April 1974
- Annual calls: 16,970 (2024)
- Chief Fire Officer: Peter Heath

Facilities and equipment
- Stations: 17
- Engines: 25
- Ladders: 2
- Fireboats: 1
- Rescue boats: 3

Website
- www.twfire.gov.uk

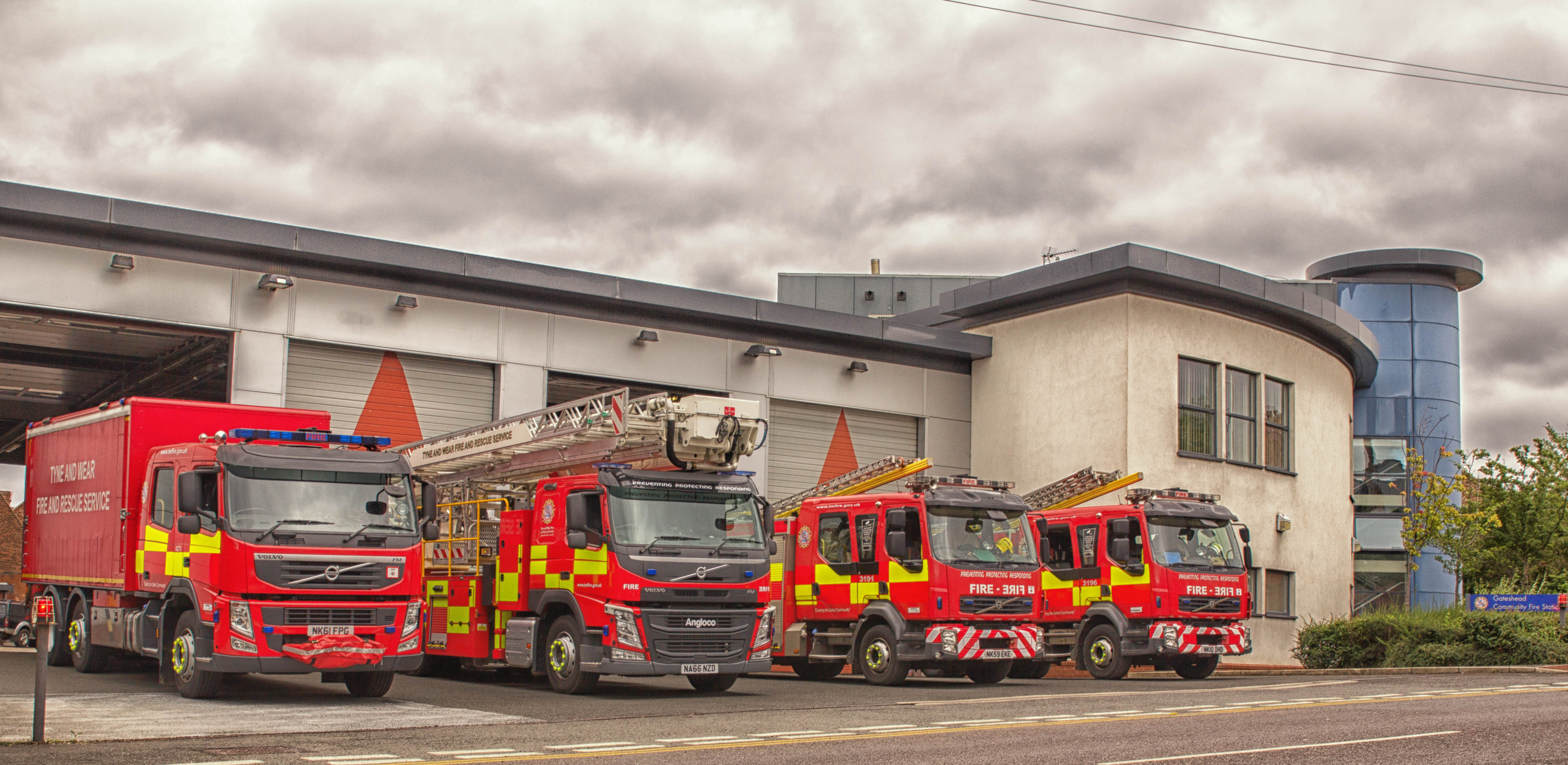
TWFRS Volvo appliances outside Gateshead fire station in 2018

Tyne and Wear Fire and Rescue Service (TWFRS), formerly known as the Tyne and Wear Metropolitan Fire Brigade, is the fire and rescue service (FRS) for the metropolitan boroughs of Newcastle Upon Tyne, Gateshead, North Tyneside, South Tyneside and Sunderland in the United Kingdom, serving a population of 1.14 million people across an area of 208 square miles (540 km^{2}). It has 17 fire stations and 25 fire engines. Tyne and Wear Fire and Rescue Authority is responsible for the running of the service, as well as the publication of performance indicators in accordance with its legal obligations. The chief fire officer is Peter Heath.

== History ==
Tyne and Wear FRS was established as Tyne and Wear Metropolitan Fire Brigade in 1974 as a result of changes to local government boundaries within the north east of England. Essentially, a fire service did exist through delivery of several smaller fire services established under the Fire Brigades Act 1938 which made it a requirement for local authorities to provide fire cover to their area, although the smaller services were never united as one service as they are today until 1974. During the second World War, all fire services created under the 1938 legislation were nationalised to form the National Fire Service, remaining this way until the Fire Services Act 1947 handed of fire cover back to local authorities in 1948. When TWFRS was established in 1974, it brought together four small local fire brigades and parts of two others – Durham County Fire Brigade, Northumberland County Fire Brigade, Newcastle and Gateshead Fire Brigade, Sunderland Fire Brigade, and South Shields and Tynemouth Fire Brigade – to form the service that exists today.

In June 2003, then Deputy Prime Minister John Prescott submitted a white paper to Parliament outlining reforms to the fire service in the UK. Part of the reforms outlined included changing the name of fire services across the UK to 'fire and rescue service', giving greater emphasis to the changing role of the fire service. In 2004, following further government publications, the name of the service was changed from Tyne and Wear Metropolitan Fire Brigade to Tyne and Wear Fire and Rescue Service, with post-2004 vehicle livery and all other parts of the service reflecting the name change. In 2006, TWFRS built six new fire stations under a Public Private Partnership initiative, replacing older fire stations that were in need of extensive upgrades; the service had also built a new headquarters in Washington to replace the previous headquarters on Pilgrim Street in the centre of Newcastle as well as a new Technical Services building. In 2011, the location for the replacement Sunderland North fire station in Fulwell was announced, with the station expected to be opened in late 2014 and replacing the current station nearby.

== Performance ==
Every fire and rescue service in England and Wales is periodically subjected to a statutory inspection by HM Inspectorate of Constabulary and Fire & Rescue Services (HMICFRS). The inspection investigated how well the service performs in a number of areas. Each area is rated as either; outstanding, good, adequate, requires improvement or inadequate. For 2023–2025, TWFRS was rated as follows:

HMICFRS Inspection of Tyne and Wear FRS
Rating 2023/2025	Description
Good	Protecting the public through fire regulation
Good	Responding to major and multi-agency incidents
Adequate	Understanding the risk of fire and other emergencies
Adequate	Preventing fires and other risks
Adequate	Understanding the risk of fire and other emergencies
Adequate	Responding to fires and other emergencies
Adequate	Making best use of resources
Adequate	UMaking the FRS affordable now and in the future
Adequate	Promoting the right values and culture
Adequate	Getting the right people with the right skills
Adequate	Managing performance and developing leaders
Requires Improvement	Ensuring fairness and promoting diversity

== Fire stations ==
The service divides its area into five geographical zones. All 17 fire stations, apart those noted below, are wholetime-crewed:

Gateshead

- Birtley
- Chopwell (retained)
- Gateshead
- Swalwell (shared with North East Ambulance Service)

Newcastle

- Byker
- Gosforth
- Newcastle Central
- West Denton (shared with North of Tyne Mountain Rescue Team and North East Ambulance Service

North Tyneside

- Tynemouth
- Wallsend

South Tyneside

- Hebburn (Tri-station shared with Northumbria Police and North East Ambulance Service)
- South Shields

Sunderland

- Farringdon (shared with Northumbria Police)
- Marley Park
- Rainton Bridge (shared with North East Ambulance Service)
- Sunderland Central
- Washington (shared with North East Ambulance Service)

== See also ==
- Fire services in the United Kingdom
