= Metropolitan Borough of Gateshead =

Metropolitan borough in Tyne and Wear, England

- Metropolitan borough
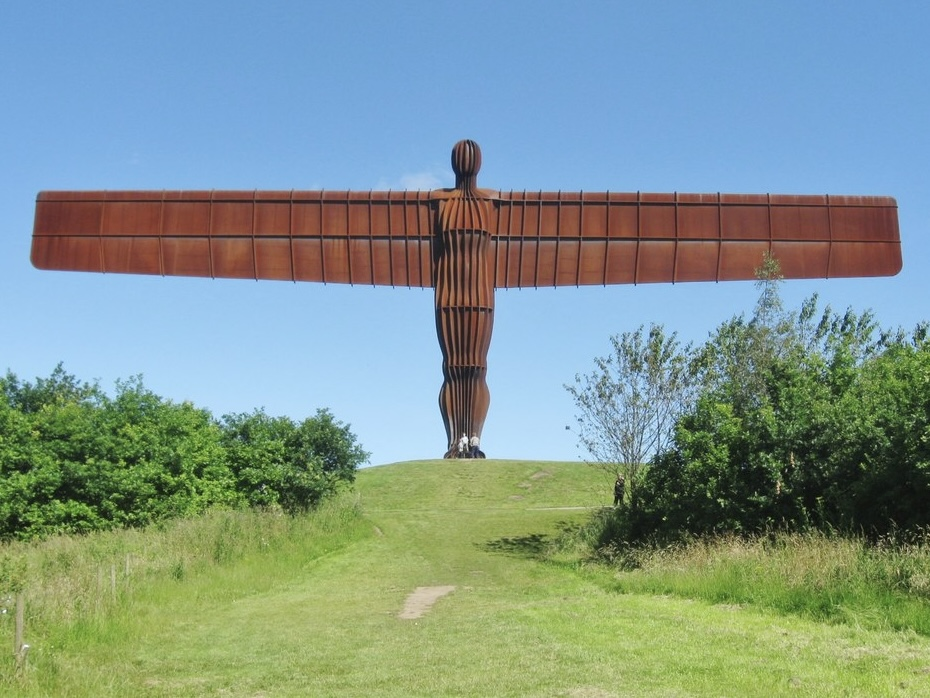
- Angel of the North

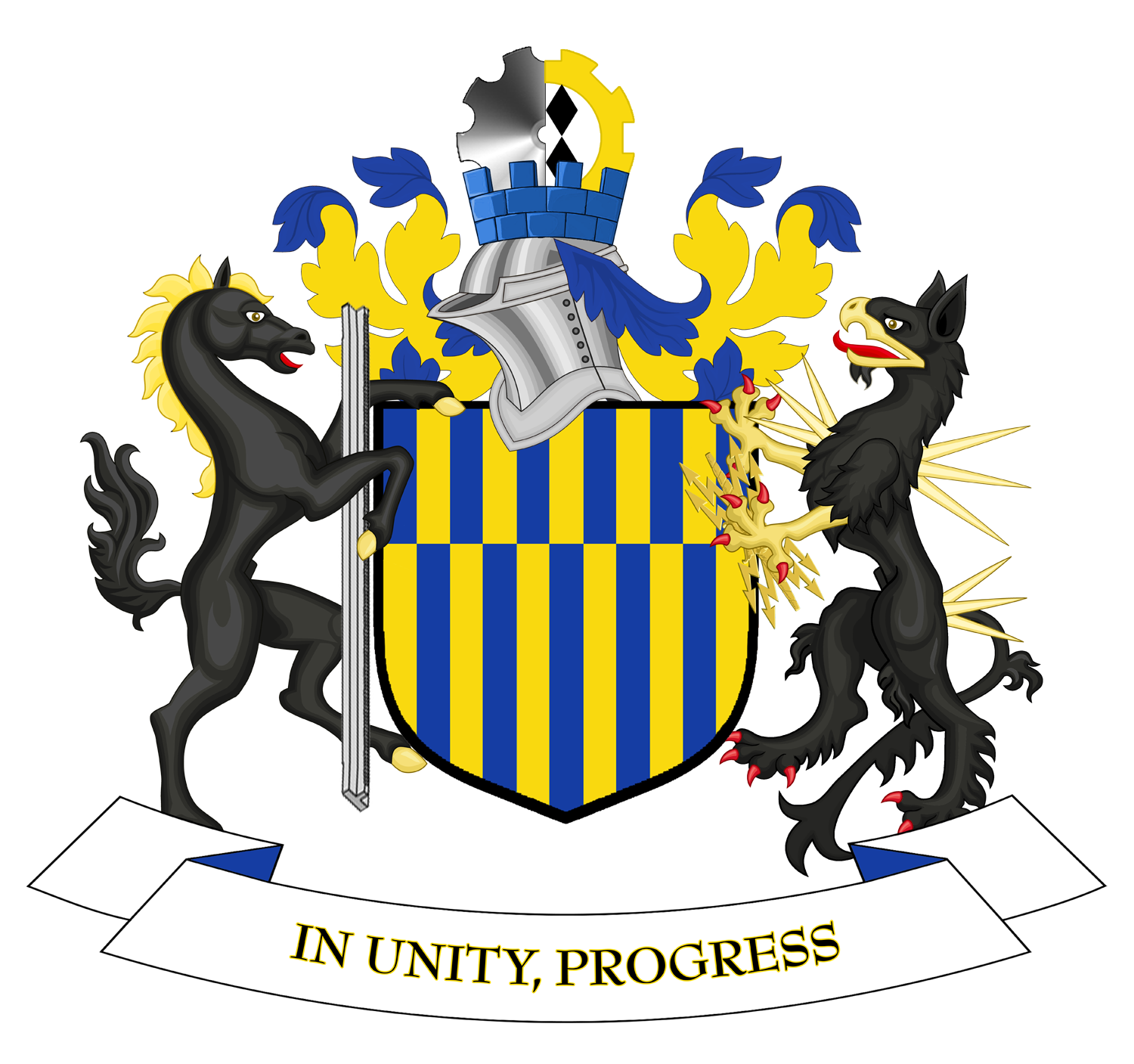
- Coat of arms
- Motto(s): In Unity, Progress
- Gateshead shown within Tyne and Wear
- Coordinates: 54°57′N 1°36′W
- Sovereign state: United Kingdom
- Country: England
- Region: North East
- Ceremonial county: Tyne and Wear
- City region: North East
- Incorporated: 1 April 1974
- Named for: Gateshead
- Administrative HQ: Civic Centre, Gateshead

Government
  - Type: Metropolitan borough
  - Body: Gateshead Council
  - Executive: Leader and cabinet
  - Control: Reform UK
  - MPs: 4 MPs: Mark Ferguson (L); Sharon Hodgson (L); Kate Osborne (L); Liz Twist (L)

Area
  - Total: 142 km^{2} (55 sq mi)
  - Rank: 168th

Population (2024)
  - Total: 202,760
  - Rank: 99th
  - Density: 1,424/km^{2} (3,690/sq mi)

Ethnicity (2021)
  - Ethnic groups: List: 93.5% White; 2.5% Asian; 1.2% Mixed; 1.1% Black; 1.6% other

Religion (2021)
  - Religion: List: 50.8% Christianity; 40.1% no religion; 2.1% Islam; 1.5% Judaism; 0.3% Hinduism; 0.2% Buddhism; 0.2% Sikhism; 0.4% other; 4.5% not stated
- Time zone: UTC+0 (GMT)
  - Summer (DST): UTC+1 (BST)
- Postcode areas: NE
- Dialling codes: 0191
- ISO 3166 code: GB-GAT
- GSS code: E08000037
- Website: gateshead.gov.uk

The Metropolitan Borough of Gateshead is a metropolitan borough in the metropolitan county of Tyne and Wear, England. It includes Gateshead, Rowlands Gill, Whickham, Blaydon, Ryton, Felling, Birtley, Pelaw, Dunston and Low Fell. The borough forms part of the Tyneside conurbation, centred on Newcastle upon Tyne. At the 2021 census, the borough had a population of 196,154.

It is bordered by the local authority areas of Newcastle upon Tyne to the north, Northumberland to the west, County Durham to the south, Sunderland to the south-east, and South Tyneside to the east. The council is a member of the North East Combined Authority.

== History ==
The town of Gateshead was an ancient borough, having been granted a charter in 1164 from Hugh Pudsey, the Bishop of Durham. The borough's functions were relatively limited until 1836, when it was made a municipal borough under the Municipal Corporations Act 1835, which standardised how most boroughs operated across the country. When elected county councils were created in 1889, Gateshead was considered large enough to provide its own county-level services, and so it was made a county borough, independent from the new Durham County Council, whilst remaining part of the geographical county of Durham.

The modern borough of Gateshead was created on 1 April 1974 under the Local Government Act 1972, as one of five metropolitan boroughs within the new county of Tyne and Wear. The borough covered the whole area of five former districts and part of a sixth, which were all abolished at the same time:

- Blaydon Urban District
- Chester-le-Street Rural District (parishes of Birtley (Note: The parish of Birtley was also reduced in area as part of the 1974 reforms to exclude the part within the designated area for the new town of Washington, which went to the borough of Sunderland.) and Lamesley only)
- Felling Urban District
- Gateshead County Borough
- Ryton Urban District
- Whickham Urban District

Aside from Gateshead, the other districts had all been lower-tier district authorities subordinate to Durham County Council prior to the 1974 reforms.

From 1974 until 1986 the borough council was a lower-tier district authority, with Tyne and Wear County Council providing county-level services. The county council was abolished in 1986, since when the borough council has provided both district-level and county-level services, as the old county borough of Gateshead had done prior to 1974. Some functions are provided across Tyne and Wear by joint committees with the other districts. The county of Tyne and Wear continues to exist as a ceremonial county for the purposes of lieutenancy, but has had no administrative functions since 1986.

== Governance ==
=== Council ===
Gateshead Council consists of 66 councillors. As of 2026, it is controlled by Reform UK. It is part of the North East Mayoral Combined Authority, which is chaired by the directly elected Mayor of the North East.

=== Parliamentary constituencies ===
In national government the borough wholly or partly contains four parliamentary constituencies: Blaydon and Consett, Gateshead Central and Whickham, Jarrow and Gateshead East and Washington and Gateshead South. The Gateshead Central and Whickham constituency is the only one wholly in Gateshead. Its MP, first elected in 2024, is Mark Ferguson (Labour). The Blaydon and Consett constituency covers the west of the borough and Birtley to the south, and has been represented since 2017 by Liz Twist, also for Labour. The Jarrow and Gateshead East constituency takes in the very eastern tip of the borough, including Pelaw. It is represented by Kate Osborne (Labour). The Washington and Gateshead South constituency is represented by Sharon Hodgson (Labour).

=== Political conferences ===
Gateshead has hosted two major political conferences. The first of these was Labour's spring conference, ahead of the 2005 general election. The Conservatives also held a conference at the Sage Gateshead in March 2008. The Conservatives do not have any councillors in Gateshead and at the time only had one MP in the whole of the north east region. That conference was seen as an attempt to connect to voters in the area.

== Education ==
Gateshead has a number of schools across the borough at both primary and secondary level. Results are well above average, with a number of outstanding schools. Gateshead has amongst the best primary and secondary schools in the country overall. A range of schools are present in Gateshead, including Jewish, Roman Catholic, Church of England, Methodist, and non-religious state schools. There is one independent school in the borough, Chase school in Whickham. Further independent schools can be found in Newcastle, Sunderland, and Tynedale.

Gateshead town itself has a further education college, Gateshead College, and a Jewish higher education institution, Beth Midrash Lemoroth — Jewish Teachers Training College.

== Environment ==
Gateshead has a variety of landscapes, urban and industrial areas include the town itself, Whickham and Blaydon in the west, with more semi-rural and rural locations in the west including Ryton and Rowlands Gill. Overall though, it is a fairly green area with over half of the borough being green belt or countryside. Most of this is located away from built up Tyneside to the south of the borough into Derwentside/Chester-le-Street and to the west into Tynedale.

In total, there are over twenty countryside sites in the borough, from ancient meadows and woodland to local nature reserves.

Notable features of Gateshead's countryside include Ryton Willows, found at Old Ryton Village on the banks of the Tyne at Ryton. Ryton Willows is 43 hectares of locally rare grassland and ponds located near to an affluent village with Georgian and Victorian houses. Because of this it is a Site of Special Scientific Interest.

The Derwent Valley, in the south/south west of the borough, offers panoramic views and pleasant walks. It was in the Derwent Valley, near Rowlands Gill, that the Northern Kites Project re-introduced red kites. This was part of a national project to introduce the birds, that were once so commonplace across the country, back into the wild. This scheme has proven to be a success, with birds being spotted across the west of the borough, from Crawcrook to Rowlands Gill itself.

The borough also contains one National Trust site, the expansive Gibside estate near Rowlands Gill, containing a stately home and a chapel, parts of its grounds have also been given SSSI status.

Even in the more urban areas of the borough, in Gateshead itself and to the east, efforts have been made to maintain green spaces and wildlife sites. One such project is Bill Quay Community Farm, east of the borough. Offering a rural experience within an urban setting, it provides an important educational tool for local schools.

== Religion ==
The 2001 census stated that the borough's predominant religion was 80.25% Christian. Other statistics found 10.94% of no religion, 6.94 unstated, 0.82% Jewish and 0.60% Muslim.

The 2011 census, stated that the Metropolitan Borough of Gateshead was 67.0% Christian, 0.9% Muslim, 1.5% Jewish, 23.9% were not religious and 5.7% of the population refused to state their religion.

== Economy ==
The area was once dependent on heavy industry such as steel making in the Derwent Valley and coal mining (across the borough). Shipbuilding on the Tyne was also a major source of employment. However, with the decline of these industries, Gateshead has attempted to re-invent itself. Although there are significant areas of deprivation in the borough, particularly in the centre and east, a number of towns and villages in the borough are popular with commuters and professionals who are employed in the service industry and well paid areas of the secondary sector such as engineering (which remains a major source of employment). Such commuter areas include Ryton, Rowlands Gill, Whickham and Low Fell. The borough is host to Tyne Yard, a major rail freight yard serving the North East.

Gateshead Quayside, once dominated by industry, has benefited from significant investment and gentrification in the past decade. It is now home to the Baltic Centre for Contemporary Art and the Sage Gateshead.

The area is also an important retail hub, with the largest shopping centre in the European Union, and second largest in Europe as a whole, the MetroCentre, situated adjacent to the A1 trunk road. Further retail, and a significant number of engineering companies are located in the Team Valley Trading Estate, which at one time was the largest industrial estate in Europe.

Gateshead Council is one of several UK local authorities which jointly own the SCAPE Group, a central purchasing body which operates framework agreements in the construction and civil engineering fields, whose purpose is to help public authorities procure works and services efficiently and cost effectively.

== Arts and culture ==
Gateshead is home to the Baltic Centre for Contemporary Art and the Sage Gateshead. The Anthony Gormley structure, the Angel of the North (the largest free standing sculpture in the United Kingdom) is in Gateshead. This puts Gateshead at the forefront of the arts both regionally and nationally.

The Shipley Art Gallery, housing outstanding collections of contemporary craft, studio ceramics, paintings and decorative art, is managed by Tyne & Wear Archives & Museums on behalf of Gateshead Council. Gateshead is a library authority and within its Central Library is a large venue facility called the Caedmon Hall.

== Sports ==
Gateshead has an association football team, Gateshead F.C., who play in the English National League. They play at the Gateshead International Stadium, which also hosts athletics.

== Freedom of the Borough ==
The following people have received the Freedom of the Borough of Gateshead:

- Sister Winfred Laver: 30 June 1978.
- Reverend Father Bernard Aloysius Strong: 30 June 1978.
- Jonathan Edwards: 24 November 2000.
- George Gill: 21 June 2002.
- Brendan Foster: 20 November 2004.
- Mike Neville: 12 October 2006.
- Joyce Quin, Baroness Quin of Gateshead: 12 October 2006.
- Tom Burlison, Baron Burlison of Rowlands Gill : 12 October 2006.
- Mayor Toru Nishimura: 20 June 2008.
- Robert Moncur: 22 January 2009.
- David Almond: 10 February 2011.
- David Clelland: 10 February 2011.
- Sir John Hall: 10 February 2011.
- Lady Hall: 10 February 2011.
- Ezriel Salomon: 10 February 2011.
- Professor Paul Younger: 8 November 2011.
- Sir Antony Gormley: 24 July 2012.
- Sune Nordgren: 24 July 2012.
- Alan J. Smith: 24 July 2012.
- Stephen Miller: 25 June 2013.
- Jill Halfpenny: 7 November 2013.
- David Puttnam, Baron Puttnam: 26 March 2015.
- Anthony Sargent: 20 March 2015.
- Peter Mole: 20 September 2018.
- Bobby Patitnson: 3 July 2023.
- David Olusoga: 4 December 2023.
- Mick Henry: 4 December 2023.

In addition, freedom was granted to 72 Engineer Regiment on 9 July 2011 and the Royal Northern Sinfonia on 26 March 2015.

== Arms ==
Coat of arms of Metropolitan Borough of Gateshead

Notes
Granted 16 August 1976.
Crest
Issuant from the mural crown Azure the circular blade of a plough Proper dimidiating a annulet embattled on the outer edge Or containing two fusils conjoined palewise Sable.
Escutcheon
Or a chief Azure overall five pallets counterchanged.
Supporters
On the dexter side a horse Sable unguled and maned Or supporting a length of tail Argent and on the sinister side a male griffin Sable armed and membered Or holding in the sinister forepaw a thunderbolt Or.
Motto
In Unity Progress
Badge
A roundel quarterly Or and Azure in chief issuing from the fess a man's head and neck all Proper in base issuing from the fess a portcullis with chains counterchanged.
