= Willsher =

Willsher is a surname. Notable people with the surname include:

- Brian Willsher (1930–2010), English sculptor
- Chris Willsher (born 1971), English musician, actor, and writer
- Edgar Willsher (1828–1885), English cricketer
- William Willsher (1814–1861), English cricketer, brother of Edgar
