= Catford Southend F.C. =

Defunct English football club

Catford Southend FC
- Catford Southend colours
- Full name: Catford Southend Football Club
- Nicknames: The Kittens, The Enders
- Founded: 1900
- Dissolved: 1927
- Ground: Bromley Road (Catford Wanderers) 1900–c. 1908; The Mount, Catford c. 1908–1925; Whitefoot Lane (Waygood Athletic Ground) 1925–1927
- Capacity: c. 10,000

Catford Southend Football Club was an English football club from Lewisham, London, that mainly played in the London League during the early years of the 20th century. A proposed merger with Charlton Athletic foundered in 1924, and after two years of professionalism, the club folded in 1927.

== History ==
Founded around the turn of the 20th century as an offshoot from a previous side, Catford Rovers, they played in various local leagues until joining the London League Division 2 ahead of the 1903–04 season.

An early mention of the team is in a newspaper article advertising trials at what is the modern day St. Dunstan's School playing fields on Canadian Avenue, Catford. In a 1904 edition of the Lewisham Borough News, Catford Southend's ground is listed as 'Bromley Road'. This may allude to the Catford Wanderers ground which can still be found in the same location today and points to the Southend in their name as this area of Catford is known by the same name.

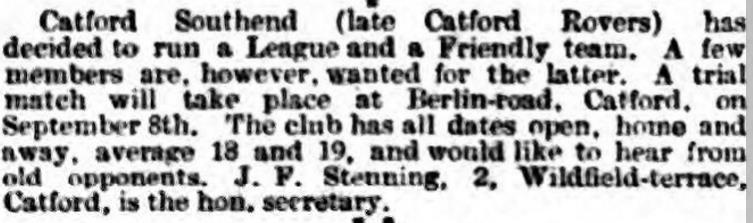
Newspaper article from 1900 advertising trials for the new team

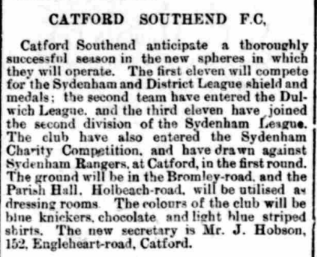
Article from the Kentish Mail and Greenwich and Deptford Observer, Friday 12 September 1902. It announces Catford Southend's official colours as Chocolate and Light Blue (the chocolate stripes would later be changed to Navy Blue).

=== London League ===
Finding their new surroundings to their liking, they gained promotion to Division 1 as champions in their inaugural season, finishing 11 points clear of second place Woolwich Polytechnic.

However, for reasons that are not known, they did not compete in 1904–05, resuming in Division 1 for the 1905–06 campaign. Here again they flourished, finishing top of the table ahead of the reserve team of Chelsea FC, who had been founded the year before.

Unable to gain promotion to the Premier Division of the London League due to it being restricted to the reserve teams of Football League clubs, Chelsea took their place and they remained in Division 1 until 1910. Whilst the league underwent various restructuring changes in the following years, The Kittens were promoted to the Premier Division (Section A) ahead of the 1910–11 season. They would remain stalwarts of the league before and after the breakout of the Great War up until 1922–23 which would be their last in the league.

=== Mooted merger with Charlton Athletic ===
Catford Southend played at a football ground in the southwestern corner of what is today Mountsfield Park from about 1909, the 1914 Ordnance Survey map shows the ground situated parallel to Laleham Road with its southern end just north of housing on Brownhill Road.

From 1919, football resumed at the ground after The Great War, with Catford competing in the London League, playing in the 1919–20 season against another southeast London side, Charlton Athletic before Charlton were promoted into the expanded Southern League for the 1920–21 campaign. Around this time, a new landlord, Harry Isaacs, took over the Dartmouth Arms on the corner of Laleham and Ringstead Roads. He had ambitious plans for Catford Southend and in early 1923 proposed a merger with Charlton Athletic that would involve the latter relocating to Catford's ground. To accommodate the anticipated larger attendances, the ground was re-oriented towards the northeast – a process that required substantial earthworks to level the ground and create an embankment at the northeast end of the ground, with new terracing supported on concrete columns to the southeast; "44,000 tons of earth had to be dug out and raked into position to form new banking". However, attendances at the newly laid-out ground during the 1923–24 season did not match expectations, wet weather caused subsidence of The Mount towards Laleham Road, and Charlton departed Catford to return to their home ground, The Valley in 1924. Catford Southend continued to play at The Mount briefly but the ground was closed in January 1927, and was absorbed into the wider Mountsfield Park.

Charlton fans who opposed the merger formed a new team, Old Charlton, who applied for Catford's place in the London league, which they were granted for the 1923–24 season. The Old Charlton team were former Charlton and Catford Southend players.

=== Kent League and decline ===
After leaving the London League, the team joined the Kent League for the 1923–24 season where they stayed until the 1926–27 season when, after failing to meet their financial obligations, they folded.
