= Target House =

Target House may refer to:

- Target House, London, a modern commercial building
- Target House, Memphis, a long-term housing solution for families of patients at the city's St. Jude Children's Research Hospital
