= The Mount (stadium) =

Former football stadium in Catford, England

Coordinates: 51°26′46″N 0°00′41″W

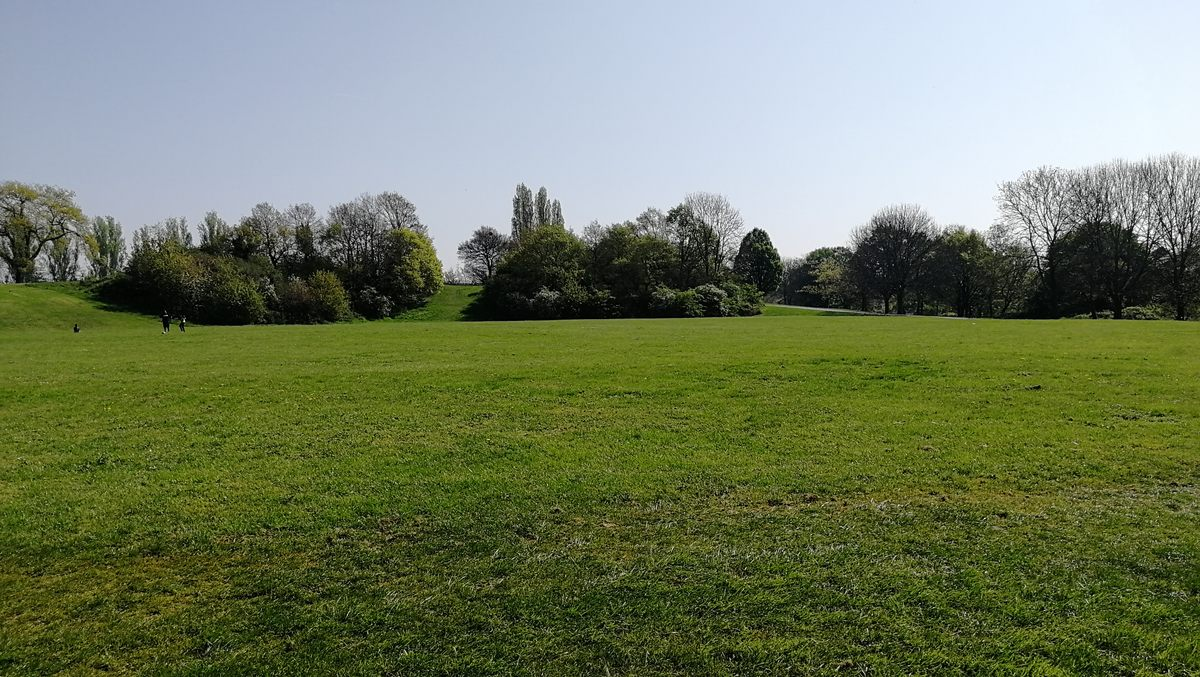
- Current site of The Mount stadium in Mountsfield Park, Catford, 2022
- Interactive map of The Mount

Construction
- Opened: Approx 1900
- Closed: Approx 1950

Tenants
- Catford Southend FC, Charlton Athletic FC

The Mount was a football stadium in Catford, located in the south west corner of what later became Mountsfield Park. Football was played there as early as the mid 19th century. Catford Southend F.C. (founded c1900) used this as their home ground and eventually developed the land into a proper stadium with terracing, and it also hosted Charlton Athletic games in the 1923–1924 season. Unusually, the stadium was elevated above its surroundings, which may have given rise to its name (as well as it being a truncation of 'Mountsfield').

== Early years ==
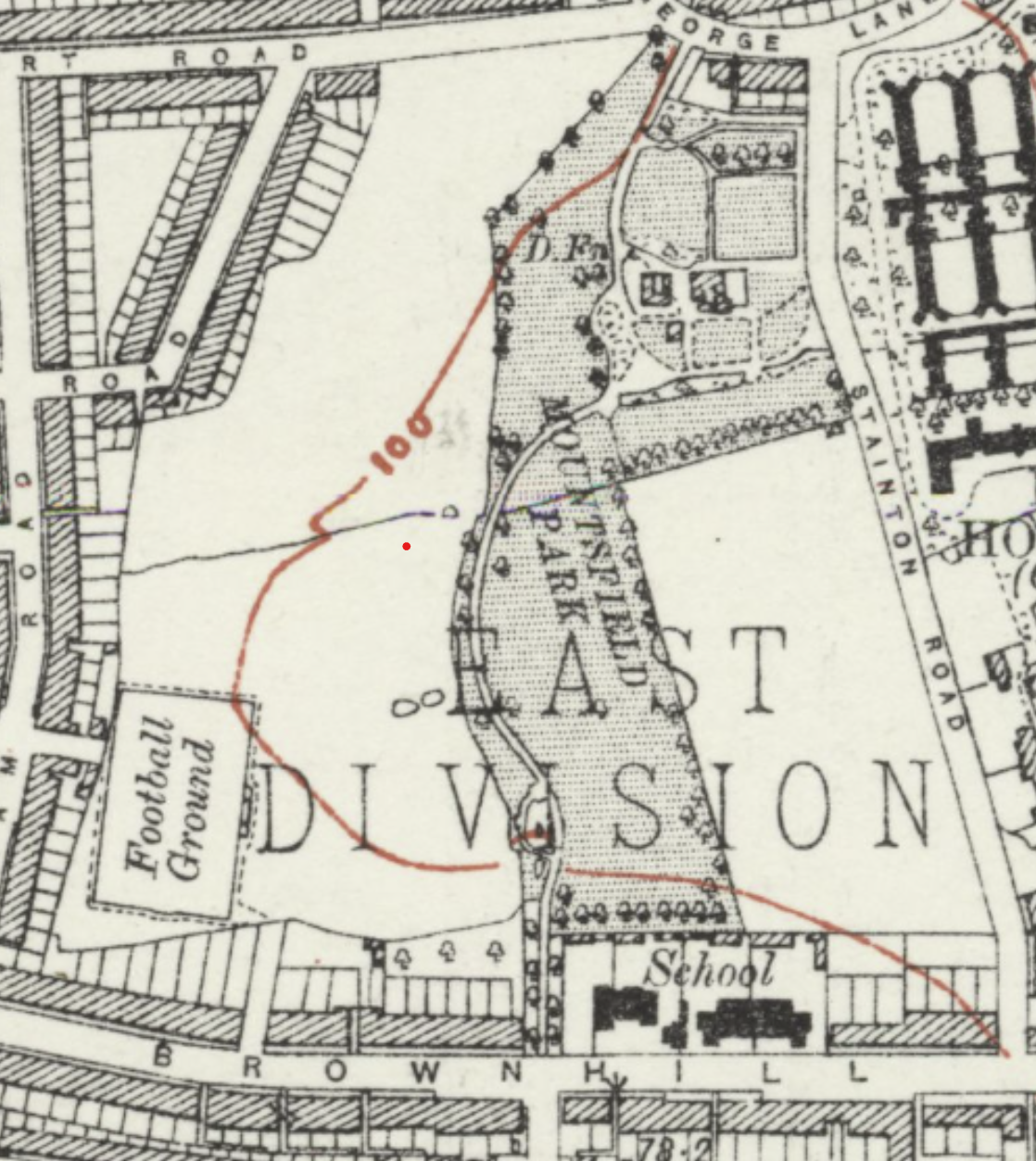
Detail of 1914 Ordnance Survey map showing Mountsfield Park

Then a London League side, Catford Southend used the ground from about 1909 until the start of World War I in 1914, and then after the war (the 1914 Ordnance Survey map shows the ground situated parallel to Laleham Road with its southern end just north of housing on Brownhill Road).

From 1919, football resumed at the ground, with Catford competing in London League, playing in the 1919–1920 season against another southeast London side, Charlton Athletic before Charlton were promoted into the expanded Southern League for the 1920–1921 campaign. Around this time, a new landlord, Harry Isaacs, took over the Dartmouth Arms on the corner of Laleham and Ringstead Roads. He had ambitious plans for Catford Southend and in early 1923 proposed a merger with Charlton Athletic that would involve the latter relocating to Catford's ground.

== Proposed Charlton Athletic move ==
The Mount was the polar opposite to The Valley: a massive sunken ground that had originally been a chalk pit, whereas The Mount was a more modest stadium built on a slope.

At the Charlton Athletic AGM on 6 April 1923, representatives of the club and supporters association confronted the board of directors over the proposal to move the club from The Valley to The Mount, home of Catford Southend. Several of the members had previously opposed the club's professionalisation and its and entry into the Football League, and protested against the relocation.

The board of directors did not believe The Valley would bring in enough regular support to make the club financially viable. The club had made a financial loss at the end of the previous season and still owed money for ground works carried out at The Valley, so the board believed a move to Catford would financially benefit the club.

At a hastily arranged board meeting on 23 April, the board unanimously agreed the relocation to The Mount. In addition to the hopes of increased gate receipts, Charlton had also been approached by Harry Isaacs, who was prepared to finance the move and pay off Charlton’s debts (a passionate racing and football fan, Isaacs was a son of Sam Isaacs, founder of the UK's first table service fish and chip restaurant chain).

It had also been agreed to merge Charlton Athletic and Catford Southend into one team, but keep the name and colours of the Catford side. Charlton directors later countered this by suggesting a change to red and white stripes and 'Catford FC' as the name. The merger came to a halt when the Football League refused to permit a name change if the club were to continue playing in the Third Division South (as Charlton wished). However, the ground move went ahead.

In protest at the move to The Mount, members of Charlton’s supporters committee formed a new amateur team called Old Charlton. They applied to the London League to take the place of Catford Southend and were elected with a team consisting of former Charlton Athletic players who had played for them before turning professional and players from Catford Southend.

To accommodate the anticipated larger attendances, the Mount ground was re-oriented towards the northeast – a process that required substantial earthworks to level the ground and create an embankment at the northeast end of the ground, with new terracing supported on concrete columns to the southeast; "44,000 tons of earth had to be dug out and raked into position to form new banking". It looked like a fort with its terraces supported on the concrete pylons needed to level the sloping ground.

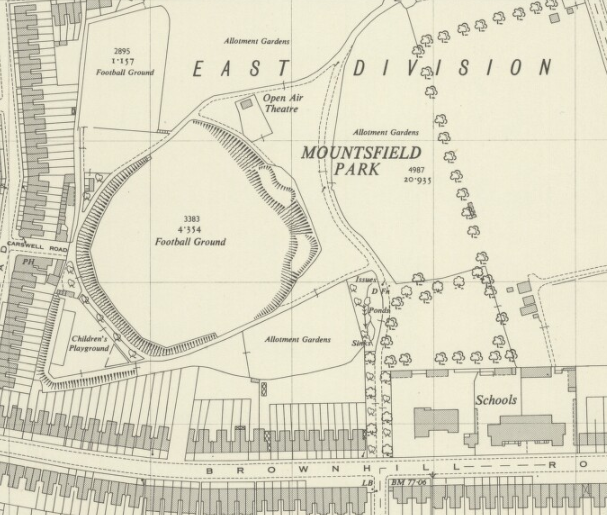
Ordnance Survey map showing the location of The Mount stadium within Mountsfield Park

However, attendances at the newly laid-out ground during the 1923–1924 season did not match expectations. Being far from their fan base in Charlton, attendances were very poor. Upon drawing Wolverhampton Wanderers in the FA Cup second round, Charlton requested the game be played at The Valley to make the most of the anticipated large crowd (Wolves were runners up in 1920–21 FA Cup final). A crowd of 20,000 people watched a 0–0 draw on 2 February 1924 (four days later, Wolves won the replay 1–0).

The 1923–1924 season was also one of the wettest on record, and the wet weather caused subsidence of The Mount towards Laleham Road. Harry Isaacs became bankrupt, and the Addicks returned to The Valley the next season.

Catford Southend remained a modest local team who eventually folded in 1927. The Mount thus became vacant and fell into disrepair and, by the 1950s, had been completely demolished. The land still remains as a grassed area within Mountsfield Park.
