= Rodney Gordon =

British architect

- Born: 2 February 1933; Wanstead, London, England
- Died: 30 May 2008 (aged 75); United Kingdom
- Occupation: Architect
- Buildings: Target House, London
- Projects: Tricorn Centre; Trinity Square, Gateshead

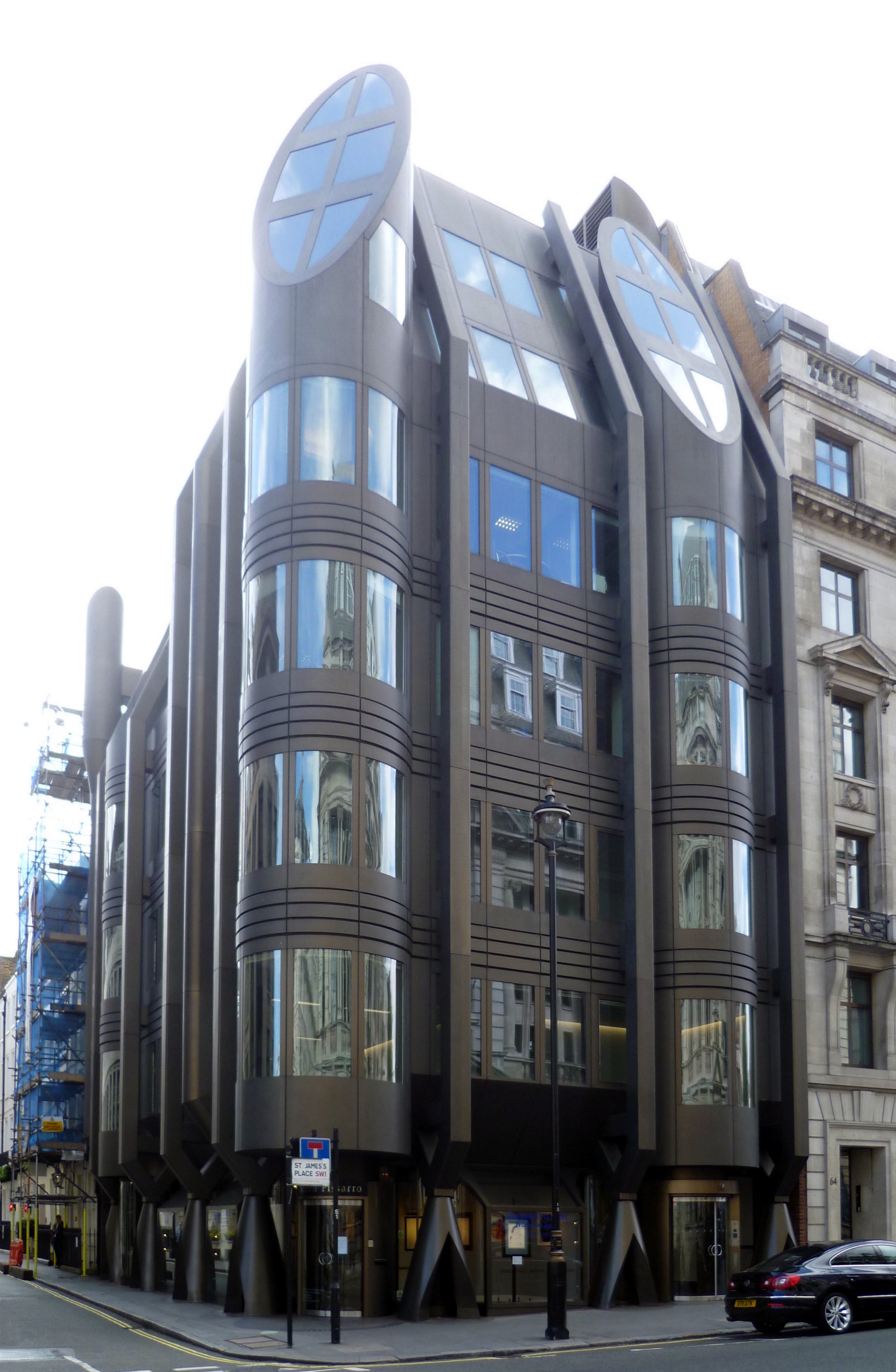
Target House, 66 St James's Street, London.

Rodney H Gordon (2 February 1933 – 30 May 2008) was an English architect. He was the primary architect of the Tricorn Centre, Portsmouth, and Trinity Square, Gateshead. Architecturally, his works were primarily in concrete; he was said to be a brutalist and his buildings have been described as "dramatic, sculptural and enormous" as well as "futuristic".

== Biography ==
Gordon was born on 2 February 1933 in Wanstead, East London to Jewish parents Chilean-born Carmen F (Poirier) and East London-born Hyman Jacob Hyman. His mother was from the naval port of Punta Arenas, Tierra Del Fuego, the southernmost city on Earth, overlooking the Straits of Magellan. Situated astride one of the world's historic trade routes, its prosperity has risen and fallen with that trade. Gordon's mother left there sometime in the 1920s and returned to London, England, where her parents had been living sometime before they left for Chile around 1903. They had initially come to London in the 1880s or 1890s to escape the Pogroms of Russia and Eastern Europe.

He went to University College Hospital Medical School at the age of 16 but then, two years later inspired by the Festival of Britain, he switched to the Hammersmith School of Building, going on to the Architectural Association School of Architecture, where he studied under the distinguished German Jewish modernist architect and urban planner Arthur Korn, before graduating in 1957. He then went to work at the London County Council (LCC) architects department for which he designed his first great work, the Michael Faraday Memorial at Elephant and Castle. In 1959 he was introduced to Owen Luder by a colleague from the LCC and by the end of the year he was working for him in the Owen Luder Partnership for which he designed the Eros House. In the 1970s he founded Batir International Architects, which later became Tripos Architects, with Ray Baum and Larry Abbot. It was during this time, at the age of 42, that he suffered a heart attack from overwork. In 1979 he designed his last work for Batir, a bronze- and aluminium-clad commercial complex on St James's Street, London.

=== Personal life ===
He was married and had one child but was later divorced. He was a passionate skier and founded the Uphill Ski Club which helps teach the physically handicapped to ski.

He died on 30 May 2008 at the age of 75.
