= Eros House =

Residential building in London, England

Coordinates: 51°26′44.85″N 0°01′07.56″W

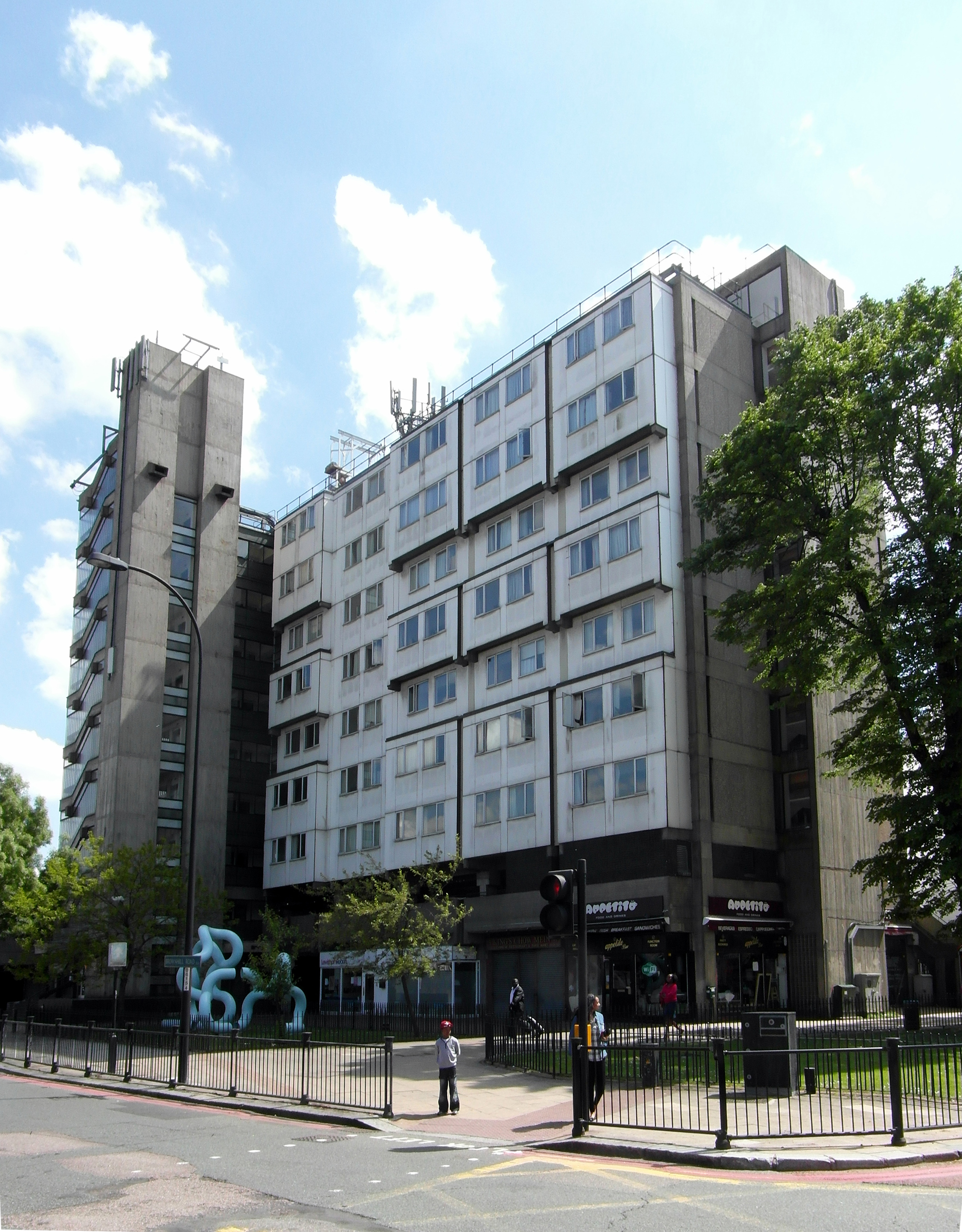
Eros House in 2013

Eros House is a Brutalist building in Catford, Lewisham, south London. It was designed by Rodney Gordon and Owen Luder and built 1960-63. It had originally been designed as an office building but was subsequently converted into flats. Around 2000 much of the building's exterior was clad with insulation panels that substantially altered its appearance. The changes were such that Luder disowned the building before his death.

The building replaced the old Eros Theater in Catford, and was part of a larger urban renewal project that also included a shopping centre designed by Gordon and Luder. The building has characteristics that are typical of Luder's and Gordon's brutalist architecture, including the freestanding stair tower. Critic Ian Nairn wrote in 1964 that "...it transforms the surroundings instead of despising them. This most craggy and uncompromising of London buildings turns out to be full of firm gentleness.".. Several photographs of Eros House as originally constructed are available on the RIBApix website.

== See also ==
- List of Brutalist structures
