= Edgar Willsher =

English cricketer (1828-1885)

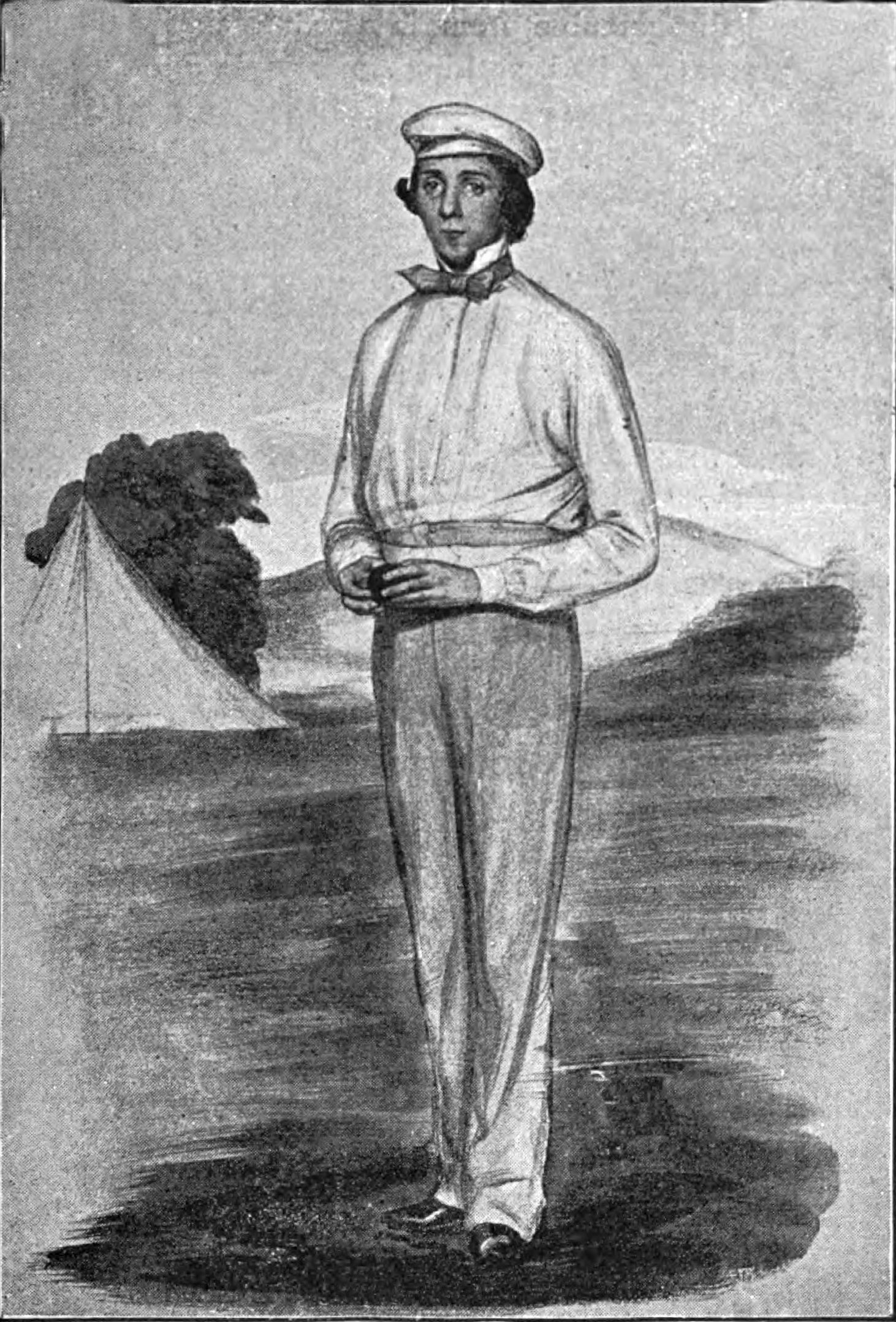

Personal information
- Born: 22 November 1828; Little Halden Farm, Rolvenden, Kent
- Died: 7 October 1885 (aged 56); Lewisham, Kent
- Nickname: Ned
- Batting: Left-handed
- Bowling: Left-arm fast
- Role: Bowler

Domestic team information
- Years: Team
- 1850–1875: Kent
- FC debut: 11 July 1850 Kent v Surrey
- Last FC: 19 August 1875 South v North

Career statistics
Competition	FC
Matches	267
Runs scored	5,089
Batting average	12.41
100s/50s	0/12
Top score	89
Balls bowled	53,267
Wickets	1,329
Bowling average	12.78
5 wickets in innings	107
10 wickets in match	30
Best bowling	8/16
Catches/stumpings	233/–
- Source: CricInfo, 26 May 2012

Edgar "Ned" Willsher (22 November 1828 – 7 October 1885) was an English cricketer known for helping the shift from roundarm to overarm bowling. A left-handed bowler, and lower-order batsman, Willsher played for Kent County Cricket Club between 1850 and 1875. He took over 1,300 wickets, despite only having one lung. He led a tour of Canada and the United States in 1868, and after retiring from his playing career became an umpire.

== Career ==
=== Early years ===
Willsher was born at Little Halden Farm, in Rolvenden, Kent. His older brother (senior by over ten years) William Willsher would go on to have an inauspicious career with Kent three years before Edgar's own debut when, in 1847, he appeared in one match, scoring a pair at number eleven and not bowling. Edgar Willsher made his own debut on 11 July 1850 at the Kennington Oval against Surrey. He took four wickets in Surrey's first innings, but was not required to bat again as Kent were dismissed successively for 52 and 84 when following on after Surrey's 248. Willsher waited over a year for his next game, against the All England Eleven on 24 July 1851. This time Kent secured a draw, with Willsher taking four wickets in a match truncated by rain. He played only one other game in 1851, finishing the season with only eleven wickets, though they were taken at an economical 17.50 runs per wicket. He gradually became a more regular feature of Kent from 1853, with thirty-nine appearances over the next four years. He took thirty-two wickets in 1854, including a then career-best 7/22. He then passed fifty wickets in the season for the first time during the 1856 season, taking 66 in total at 10.76 runs per wicket from only eight games. This included four ten-wicket match hauls. He then bettered his efforts with 71 wickets from ten games in 1857, though could only take 29 scalps in 1858 playing only six games. Seventy-nine wickets in 1859, and one better in 1860 established Willsher as a key bowler for Kent, as he regularly featured in their starting XI with fourteen games in each season. The 1860 season also saw his career-best innings figures of 8/16, as well as his first noted successes with the bat, scoring his maiden half century, one of four for the season. Fifteen more games in 1861 yielded another career-best 87 wickets in the season, and his second eight-wicket haul.

=== Overarm bowling ===
By the early 1860s, roundarm had replaced underarm, as the standard form of bowling but overarm was still illegal, even though it was in occasional use. Laws of the sport were modified in 1845 in an attempt to limit the ever increasing height of the bowler's arm. On 26 August 1862 at The Oval, Willsher became the first cricketer to be no-balled for bowling overarm. Playing for an England against Surrey he was called six times by umpire John Lillywhite for delivering the ball when his hand was above his shoulder. Outraged, Willsher left the field in protest with eight of his professional colleagues (England's two amateurs remained on the field) and play was abandoned for the rest of the day. When Lillywhite refused to accept the legality of Willsher's action, he was replaced as umpire so that the game could continue. Willsher went on to take 6 for 49. As a result of this incident, which may well have been planned in advance in order to force the issue, the laws were changed and overarm bowling was legalised from the beginning of the 1864 season. Meanwhile, the 1863 season saw another 80 wickets for Willsher, as well as 494 runs with the bat, including three half-centuries. The runs scored during the season, and his highest score of 89, would remain his career best.

=== Later career ===
1864 saw more success for Willsher in the County Championship with 79 more wickets at 13.84 runs each, though he failed to pass 50 with the bat. Though he then struggled with only 47 wickets in 1865, he remained consistent with 52 scalps in 1866 and 51 more in the following season, though again failing with the bat with a best over both years of 46. The 1868 season, however, was the best of Willsher's career with the ball, taking 113 wickets at only 9.98 runs per wicket, the second occasion – and one of only three in his entire career – where Willsher's season average was under 10.00. This included twelve five-wicket hauls, and six ten-wicket hauls, both career-best performances. Though once again struggling with the bat, scoring 246 runs at 10.69, Willsher's 113 wickets was second in the list of wicket-takers for the 1868 season, behind only future Test player James Southerton, and Willsher's average easily out-performed Southerton's 13.76. Willsher enjoyed successes in 1869 and 1870, with 64 and 84 wickets respectively, and took 70 more wickets in 1871; however Willsher, by then forty-two years of age, began to enjoy fewer returns for his bowling. From 1872 until retirement in 1875 he never bettered 35 wickets in a season, though he averages remained strong and his five-wicket hauls consistent. His appearances for Kent began to diminish, and in 1874 he played only seven matches, not passing fifty with the bat after 1869, and taking only two ten-wicket hauls in his final four seasons compared to thirteen in the proceeding four.

Willsher played only two games in the 1875 season. The first, on 17 June against Hampshire, saw Willsher take four wickets in a convincing Kent innings victory, It was his final appearance for his county. In the last game of his career on 19 August between two invitation XI's representing the North and South of the country, Willsher, playing alongside WG Grace, made only one run and was not called on to bowl.
