= Target House, London =

Target House
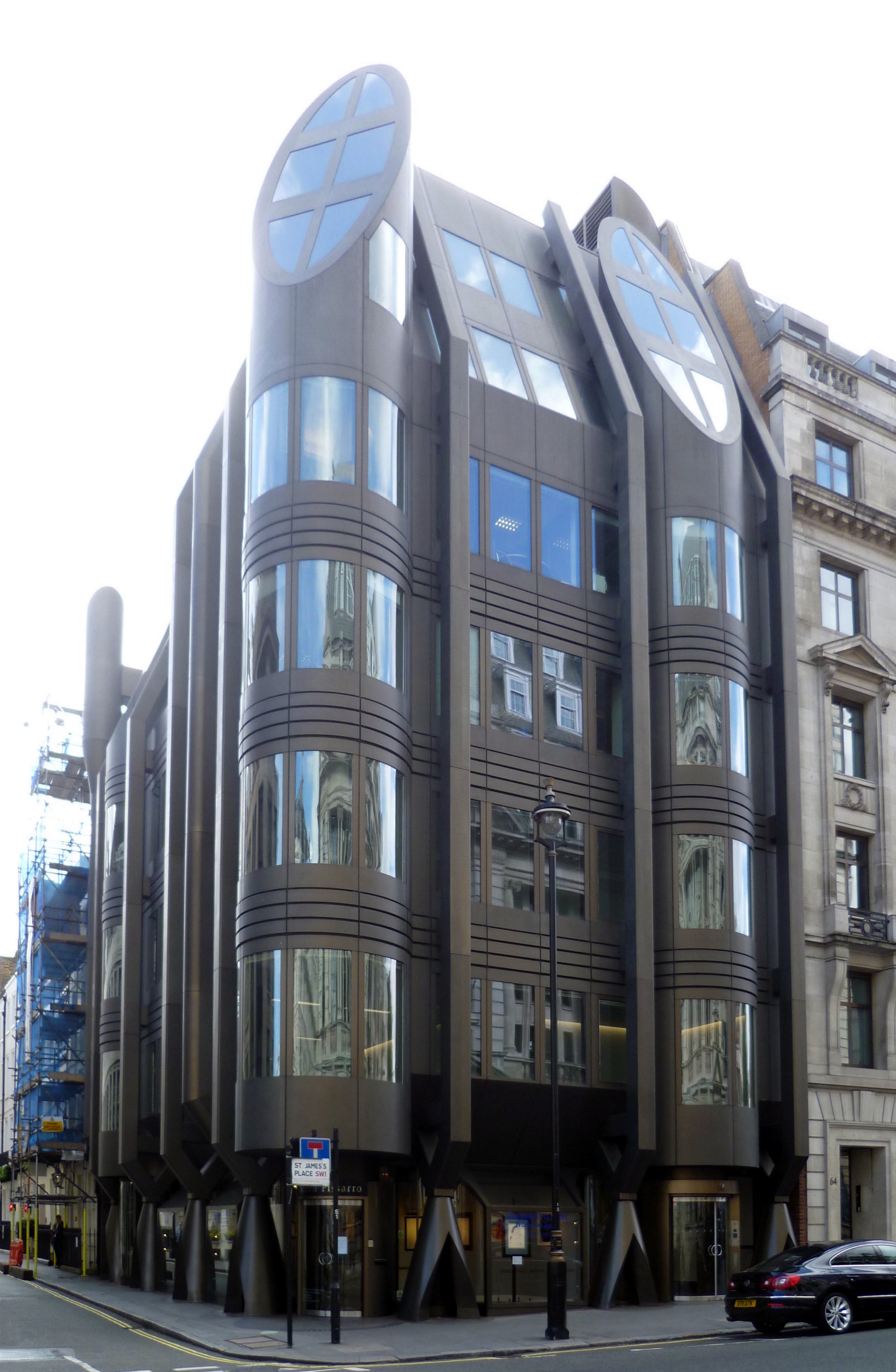
- Interactive map of the Target House area

General information
- Type: Mixed use
- Location: London, England
- Coordinates: 51.5061°N 0.1392°W
- Completed: 1984

Technical details
- Floor count: 6
- Floor area: 11,843 square feet (1,100 m^{2})

Design and construction
- Architect: Rodney Gordon

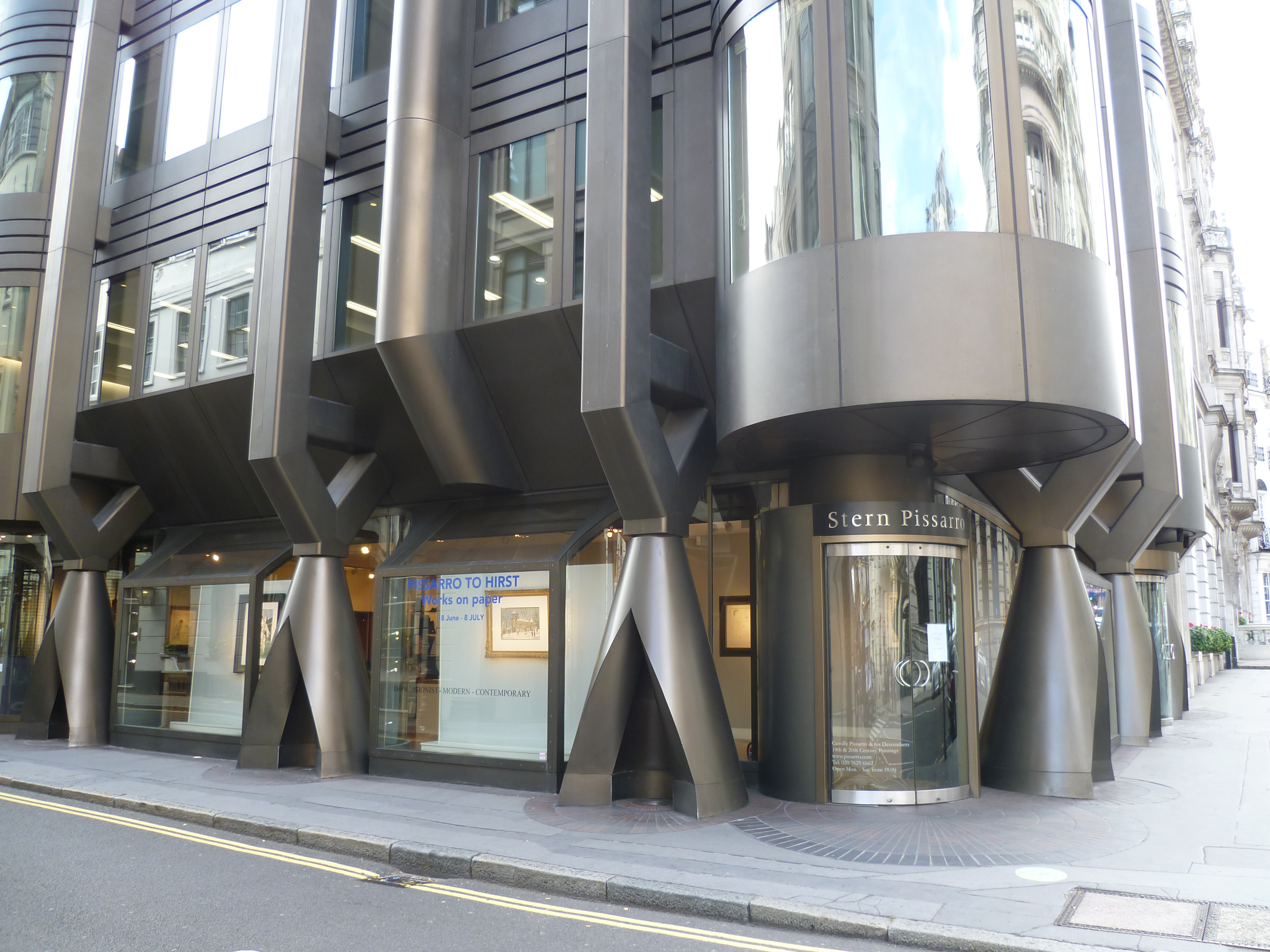
Ground floor showing the premises of Stern Pissarro

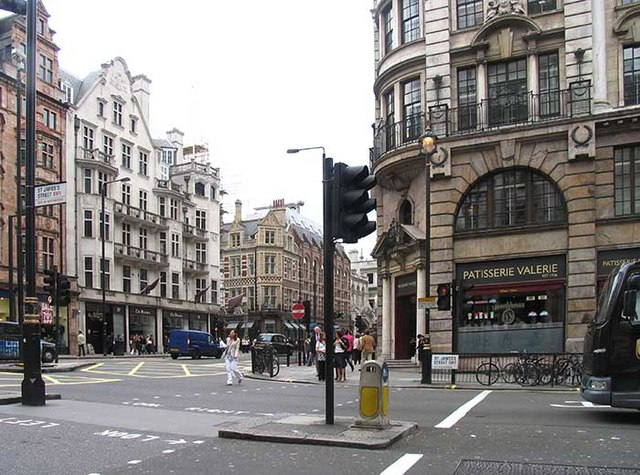
St James's Street from Piccadilly

Target House is a modern commercial building designed by British modernist architect Rodney Gordon (1933–2008) of Tripos Architects. It is located at 66 St James's Street, London, at the junction with St James's Place.

== Design and construction ==
The building was designed in 1979 and completed in 1984. It replaced Map House, designed by R.J. Worley. The anodised bronze and aluminum cladding of the building made it a departure from the "brutalist" concrete designs more usually produced by Gordon.

== Reception ==
Charles McKean, the architecture correspondent for The Times, praised Target House, then known just as 66 St James's Street, for its boldness and panache but doubted the medieval credentials of the building claimed by the designers. He pointed out that the area had been developed in the seventeenth and eighteenth centuries and was not known for its medieval architecture apart from the faux medievalism of the nineteenth century.

McKean argued that the reference to the medieval was a red-herring and the building was in fact more notable for its modernity and affinity with the "space programme". He speculated that the chopped-off towers at roof-line, that made the spectator say "ouch" and were the least successful part of the design in his opinion, were really the result of planning regulations that restricted the height of new buildings in the area.

== Occupancy ==
The design included retail premises, offices and flats and the building was used in that form for many years. The ground floor is still occupied by the Stern Pissarro Gallery, founded in 1964. In February 2013, a successful planning application was made to Westminster Council to allow a change of use of the first to fourth floors from B1 (offices) to C3 (residential) use.

== Ownership ==
In 2012, the building was sold by Standard Life Investments to Albert Hay's Capital and City Group for £10.5 million.
