= Mountsfield Park =

Park in Catford, London

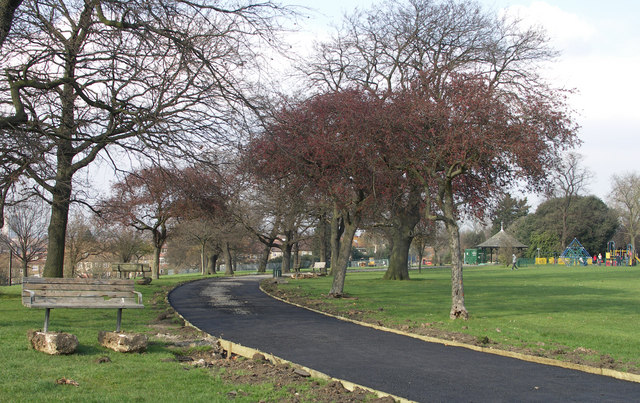
- Interactive map of Mountsfield Park
- Type: public park
- Location: London, England
- Coordinates: 51°26′50″N 0°00′22″W
- Area: 13 hectares (32 acres)
- Created: 1905
- Operator: London Borough of Lewisham
- Open: 8am–sunset
- Status: Open year round
- Website: lewisham.gov.uk/inmyarea/openspaces/parks/mountsfield-park

Mountsfield Park is a public park in Catford, near to Hither Green within the London Borough of Lewisham. It opened in 1905 and has since been greatly enlarged, incorporating a former football ground, The Mount, and adjacent allotments and playing fields. The nearest railway stations are Hither Green, Ladywell and Lewisham Station. Catford and Catford Bridge are also nearby.

== History ==
The core area of the park was originally part of Mountsfield, a substantial house and grounds, built in 1845 for the noted microlepidopterist and entomologist Henry Tibbats Stainton by his father as a wedding gift. The house and some 2.5 hectares (6 acres) of parkland lying to the south of it were bequeathed for a park by his widow in 1903, with the park opening to the public in August 1905.

Over time, the park was substantially enlarged, with land bought from the School Board for London and further allotment land acquired.

=== The Mount ===
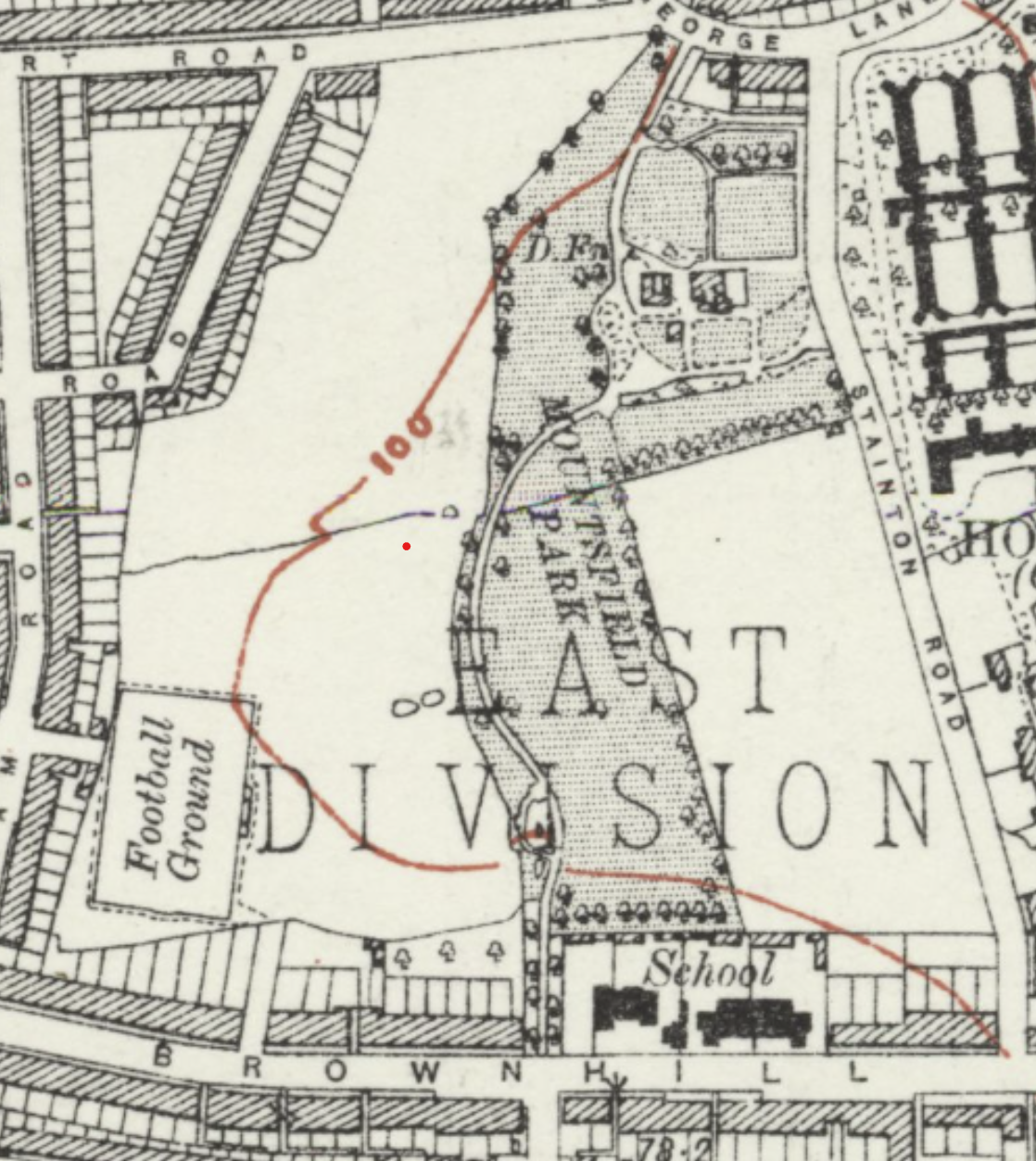
Detail of 1914 Ordnance Survey map showing Mountsfield Park

The southwestern corner of the current park was previously a football ground used by London League side Catford Southend F.C. from about 1909 until the start of World War I in 1914, and then after the war (the 1914 Ordnance Survey map shows the ground situated parallel to Laleham Road with its southern end just north of housing on Brownhill Road).

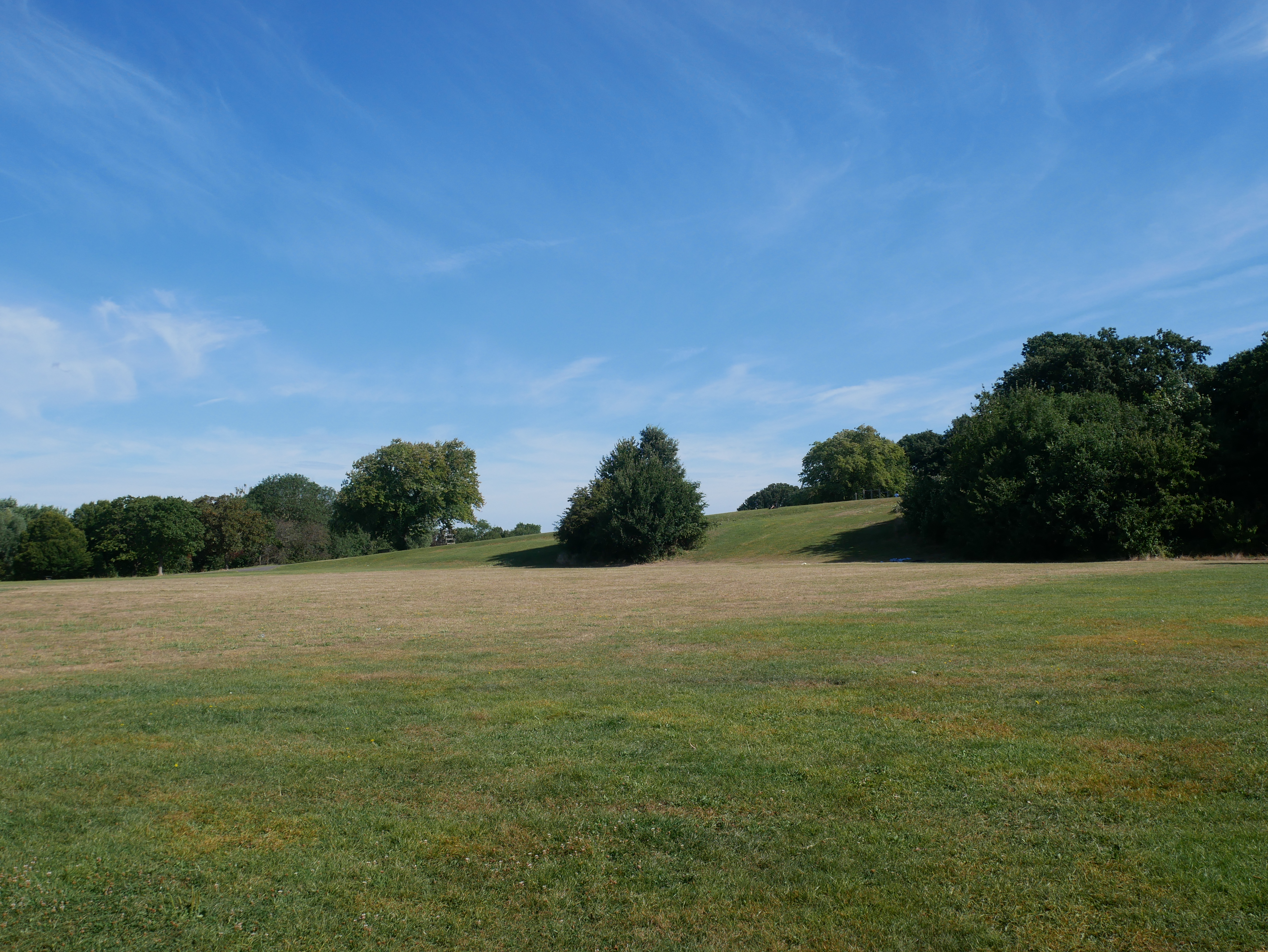
Southwest area of Mountsfield Park

From 1919, football resumed at the ground, with Catford competing in the London League, playing in the 1919–1920 season against another southeast London side, Charlton Athletic before Charlton were promoted into the expanded Southern League for the 1920–1921 campaign. Around this time, a new landlord, Harry Isaacs, took over the Dartmouth Arms on the corner of Laleham and Ringstead Roads. He had ambitious plans for Catford Southend and in early 1923 proposed a merger with Charlton Athletic that would involve the latter relocating to Catford's ground. To accommodate the anticipated larger attendances, the ground was re-oriented towards the northeast – a process that required substantial earthworks to level the ground and create an embankment at the northeast end of the ground, with new terracing supported on concrete columns to the southeast; "44,000 tons of earth had to be dug out and raked into position to form new banking". However, attendances at the newly laid-out ground during the 1923–1924 season did not match expectations, wet weather caused subsidence of The Mount towards Laleham Road, and Charlton departed Catford to return to their home ground, The Valley, in 1924. Catford Southend continued to play at The Mount briefly but the ground was closed in January 1927, and was absorbed into the wider Mountsfield Park.

=== Post-WWII expansion ===
A bombed row of houses in George Lane was added after World War II and a further tranche of land formerly used as playing fields by Catford Boys School in Brownhill Road was added in 1994.

The house itself, which stood in the north-east corner of the park, was demolished in 1905, but stables and outbuildings were retained and used as park keepers’ buildings until a fire destroyed them in 1969. A former museum for Stainton’s entomology collections was a tearoom until its demolition in 1981.

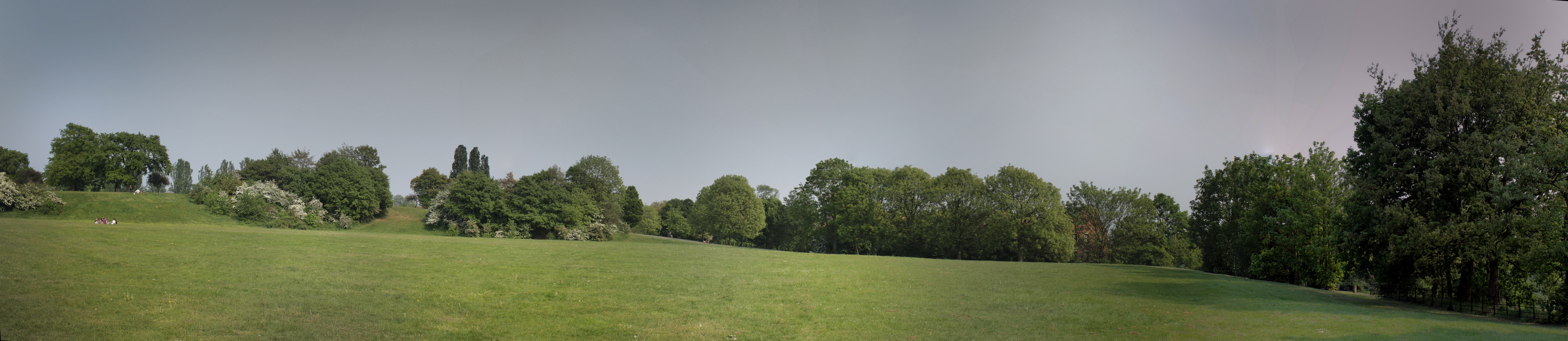
Panorama of the park

== Layout and notable features ==
Today, the park extends to 13 hectares (32 acres) and there are entrances on Stainton Road, Brownhill Road, George Lane and Carswell Road. The biggest gates to the Park are on Carswell Road. Facilities include football pitches, tennis courts, ball court and children’s play area. Because of its size, location and parking, it is often used for large events, including Lewisham Borough Council’s People’s Day event in July, typically attracting crowds of over 30,000. It also hosts the weekly Catford parkrun.

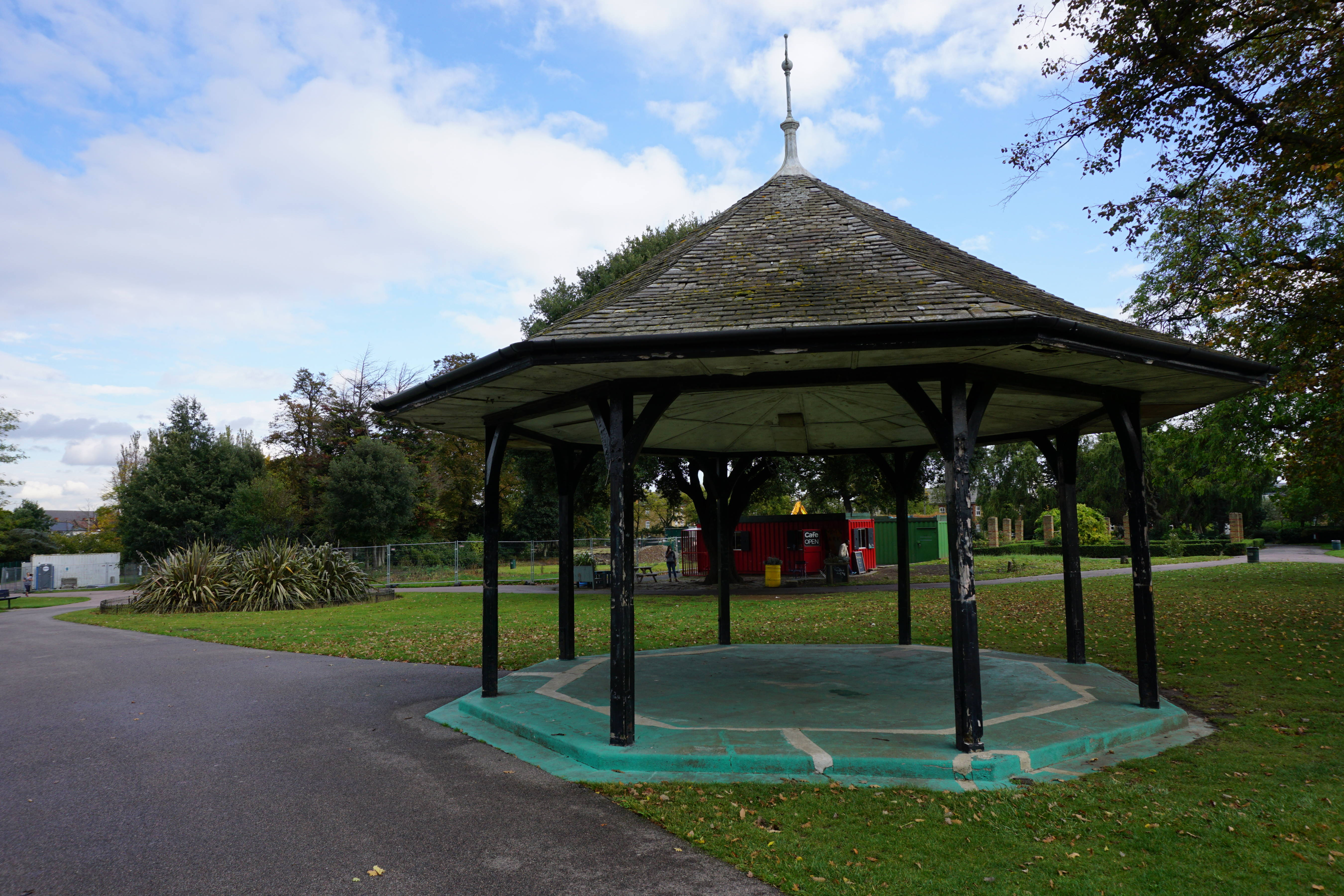
The bandstand in Mountsfield Park in October 2014

The park also includes a bandstand, community garden, meadow grassland, and Edwardian rose garden, while areas of high ground offer views west over Catford and towards Crystal Palace. It is considered a key park by the borough and has a park keeper on Saturdays and Mondays.

Since April 2025 a bronze statue in memory of Ella Adoo-Kissi-Debrah, the schoolgirl who was the first person to have air pollution recorded as a cause of death on her death certificate, has been situated in the park. The statue was made by sculptor Hannah Stewart.

== External sources ==
- Lewisham Council Mountsfield Park page
- Friends of Mountsfield Park
