= Catford =

District in south east London, England

Coordinates: 51.4452°N 0.0207°W

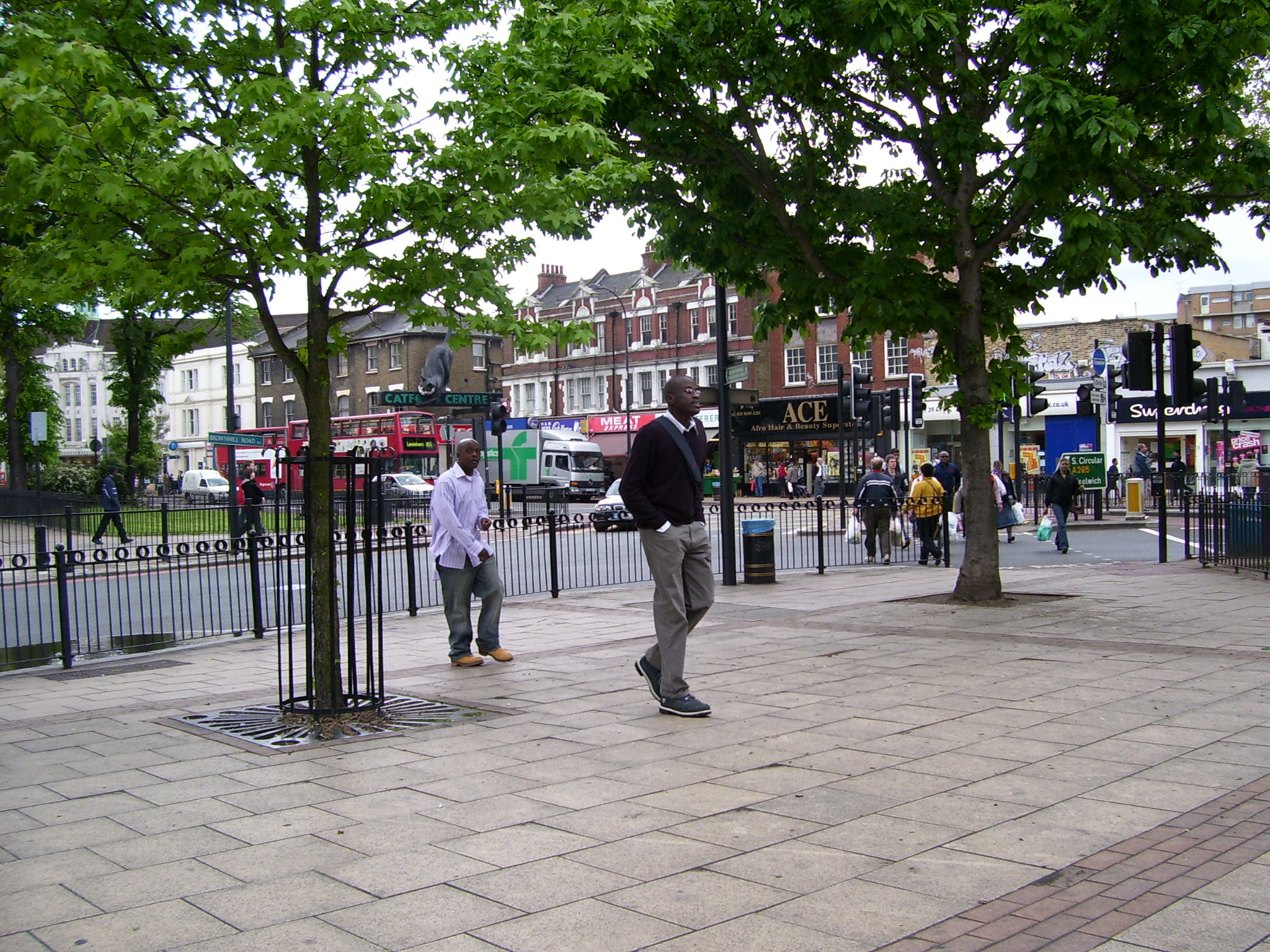
- The town centre, with the 'village green' including water pump just visible to the left

- Location within Greater London
- Population: 44,905 (2011 Census)
- OS grid reference: TQ385735
- London borough: Lewisham
- Ceremonial county: Greater London
- Region: London
- Country: England
- Sovereign state: United Kingdom
- Post town: LONDON
- Postcode district: SE6
- Dialling code: 020
- Police: Metropolitan
- Fire: London
- Ambulance: London
- UK Parliament: Lewisham East
- London Assembly: Greenwich and Lewisham

Catford is a district in south-east London, England, and the administrative centre of the London Borough of Lewisham. It is southwest of Lewisham itself, mostly in the Rushey Green and Catford South wards. The population of Catford, including Bellingham, was 44,905 in 2011.

Catford covers most of SE6 postcode district. The area is identified in the London Plan as one of 35 major centres in Greater London.

== History ==
=== Toponymy ===
A map showing the Catford ward of Lewisham Metropolitan Borough as it appeared in 1916.

The origin of the name is unknown. Speculation suggests it may derive from the place where cattle crossed the river Ravensbourne in Anglo-Saxon times or from wild cats using the river crossing.

== Governance ==
Catford is covered by the Rushey Green and Catford South wards in the London Borough of Lewisham. It also makes up a large part of the Lewisham East constituency for elections to the House of Commons of the United Kingdom.

== Built environment ==
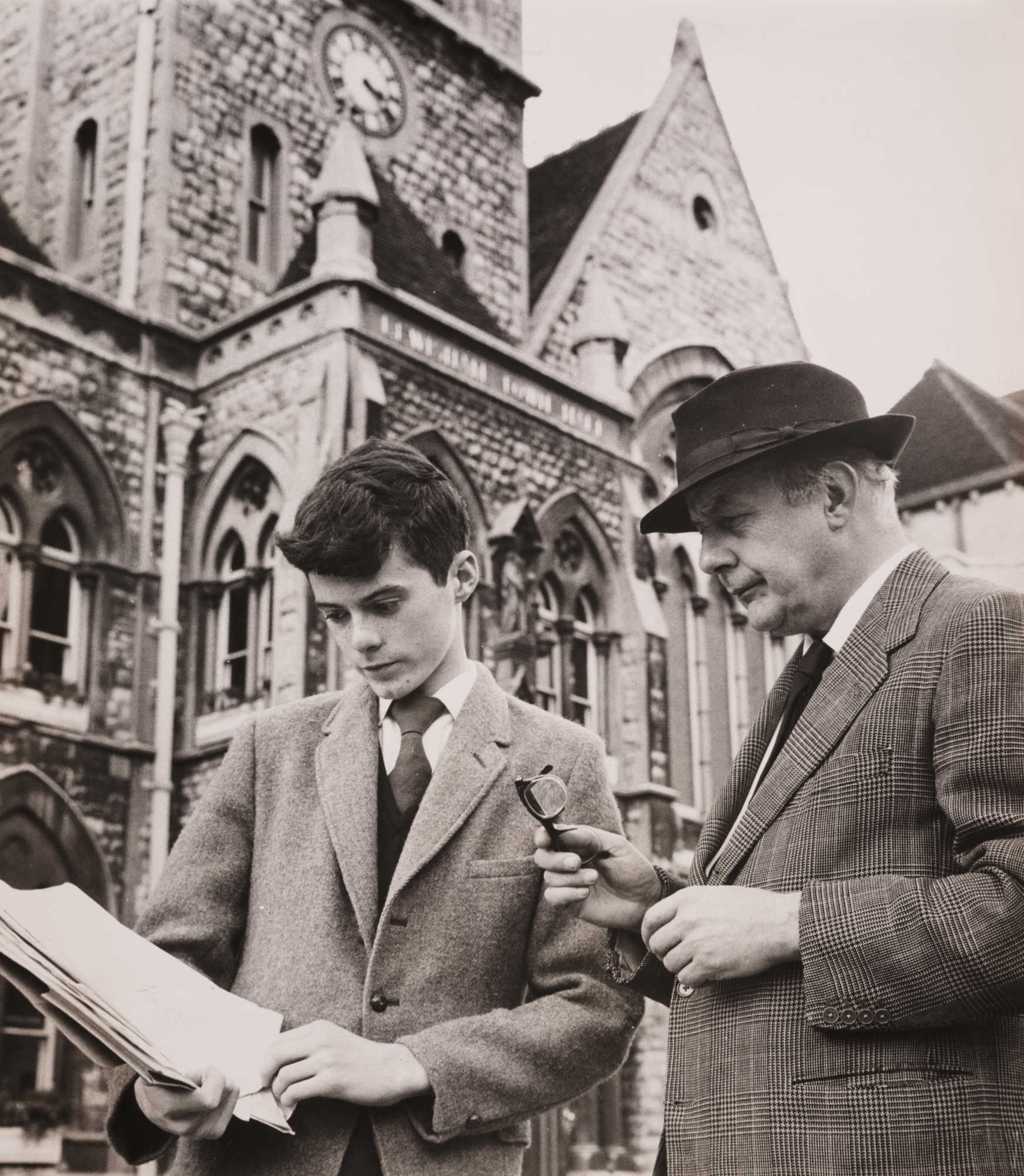
John Betjeman reads William Norton's Petition to Save Lewisham Town Hall, 1961

=== Early developments ===
The term Catford appears to have originally been specific to a crossing - subsequently bridged - over the river Ravensbourne while the village centred on the now A21 and Catford Broadway was called Rush Green and, subsequently, Rushy Green. The section of the A21 now called Rushey Green was Lewisham Road on the 1866 Ordnance Survey map of the area. In the 1850's a railway station was opened adjoining the bridge over the Ravensbourne and this station was named Catford Bridge Station. It stimulated significant development of the semi rural surroundings and the name Catford began to be used for the wider area.

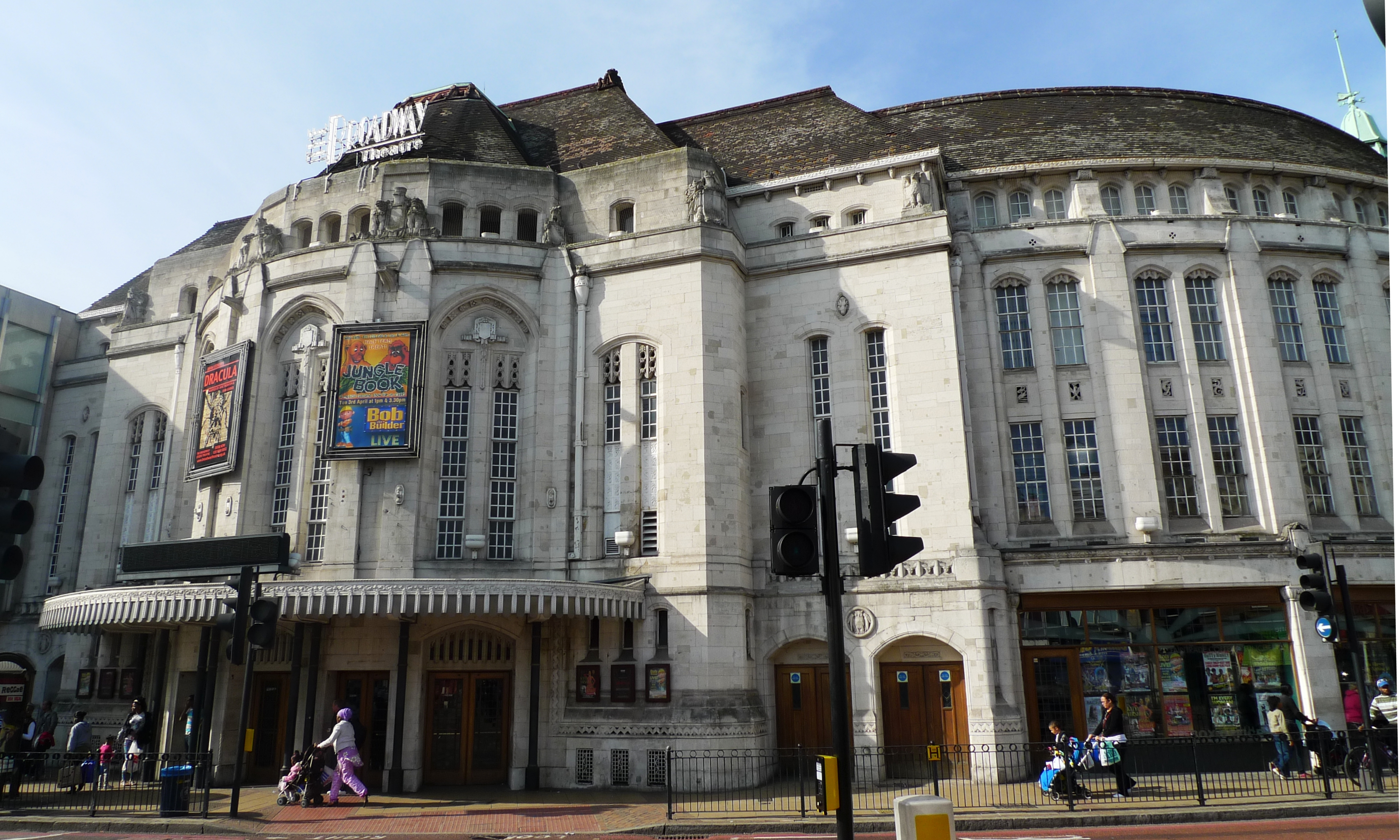
The Broadway Theatre

There are several notable buildings in the centre of Catford. The Broadway Theatre is an art deco building adjoining the town hall. It was opened in 1932 as a Concert Hall and is now a Grade II listed building. The exterior has a curved stone structure decorated with shields and heraldic emblems, topped with a copper dome while the interior retains an Art Deco style. There had been two purpose built cinemas in the centre of Catford. The Hippodrome was demolished to make way for Eros House and the other, diagonally opposite the Theatre, is now a worship hall.

The 1960s and 70s had a considerable impact on the architecture of Catford. Eros House was constructed in 1962, the old Town Hall of 1875 was replaced by the current Civic Suite in 1968 (soon after the merger of the metropolitan boroughs of Lewisham and Deptford) and Milford Towers was developed in the early 1970's. Laurence House, where many of the Lewisham Council functions are housed, including the offices of the Mayor of Lewisham and the Young Mayors of Lewisham, is on the site of old St Laurence's Church, built by the architect Hugh Roumieu Gough in 1887 and demolished in 1969. The new parish church of St Laurence was built 200 metres down Bromley Road in 1968 by the architect Ralph Covell, working in a Brutalist idiom, and is now Grade II Listed.

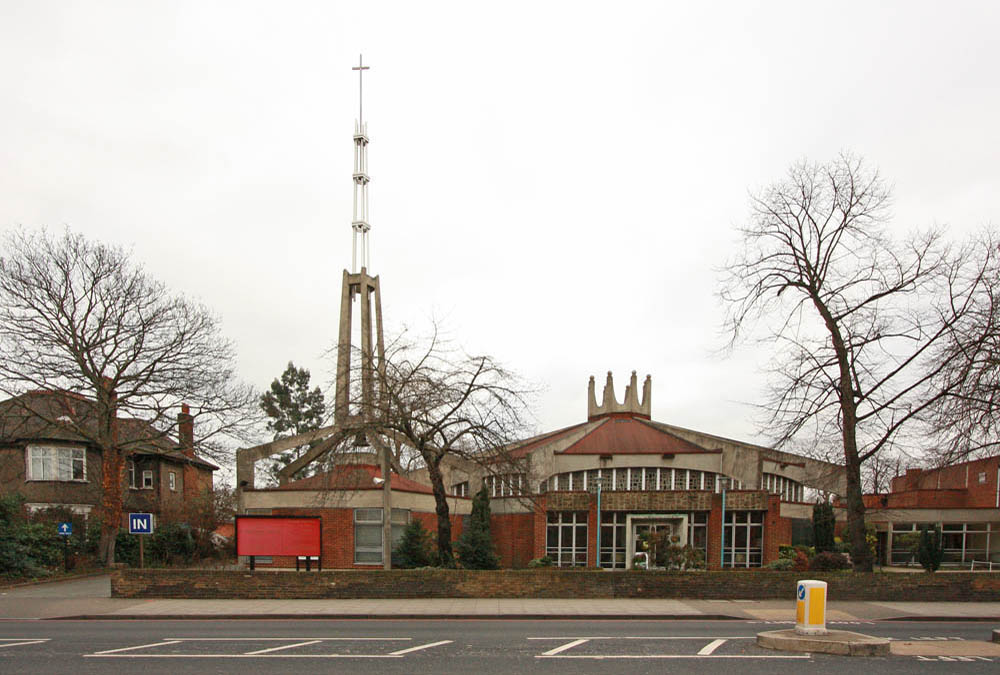
The 1968 St Laurence Church

In Rushey Green, the old village water hand-pump from the 1850s survives.

At the end of World War II, the 186-bungalow Excalibur Estate was laid out in Bellingham, south of Catford, and by 2011 was the largest surviving prefab estate in Britain. Six of the houses were given Grade II listing but the remainder are being demolished in a redevelopment project.

=== Brutalist architecture ===
A few examples of Brutalist architecture survive, including Eros House, the Catford shopping centre and Milford Towers, all designed by the architect Owen Luder.

Architecture critic Ian Nairn praised Eros House (Owen Luder, 1962) as:

A monster sat down in Catford and just what the place needed. No offence meant: this southward extension of Lewisham High Street badly wanted stiffening. Now there is a punchy concrete focus ('you know, that funny new building') both close to and at a distance, from the desolate heights of the Downham Estate, where it stands straight to the afternoon sun. Rough concrete is put through all its paces, front convex eaves on Sainsbury's to a staircase tower which is either afflicted with an astounding set of visual distortions or is actually leaning. Again, no offence meant. Unlike many other avant-garde buildings, particularly in the universities, this one is done from real conviction, not from a desire for self-advertisement. The gaunt honesty of those projecting concrete frames carrying boxed-out bow windows persists. It is not done at you and it transforms the surroundings instead of despising them. This most craggy and uncompromising of London buildings turns out to be full of firm gentleness.

In 2015, Lewisham Council decided to demolish Milford Towers, as the housing estate was in disrepair and the land could be better used to meet the needs of local residents. In 2018 the estate was however refurbished, with demolition still planned in the longer-term.

=== Landmarks ===
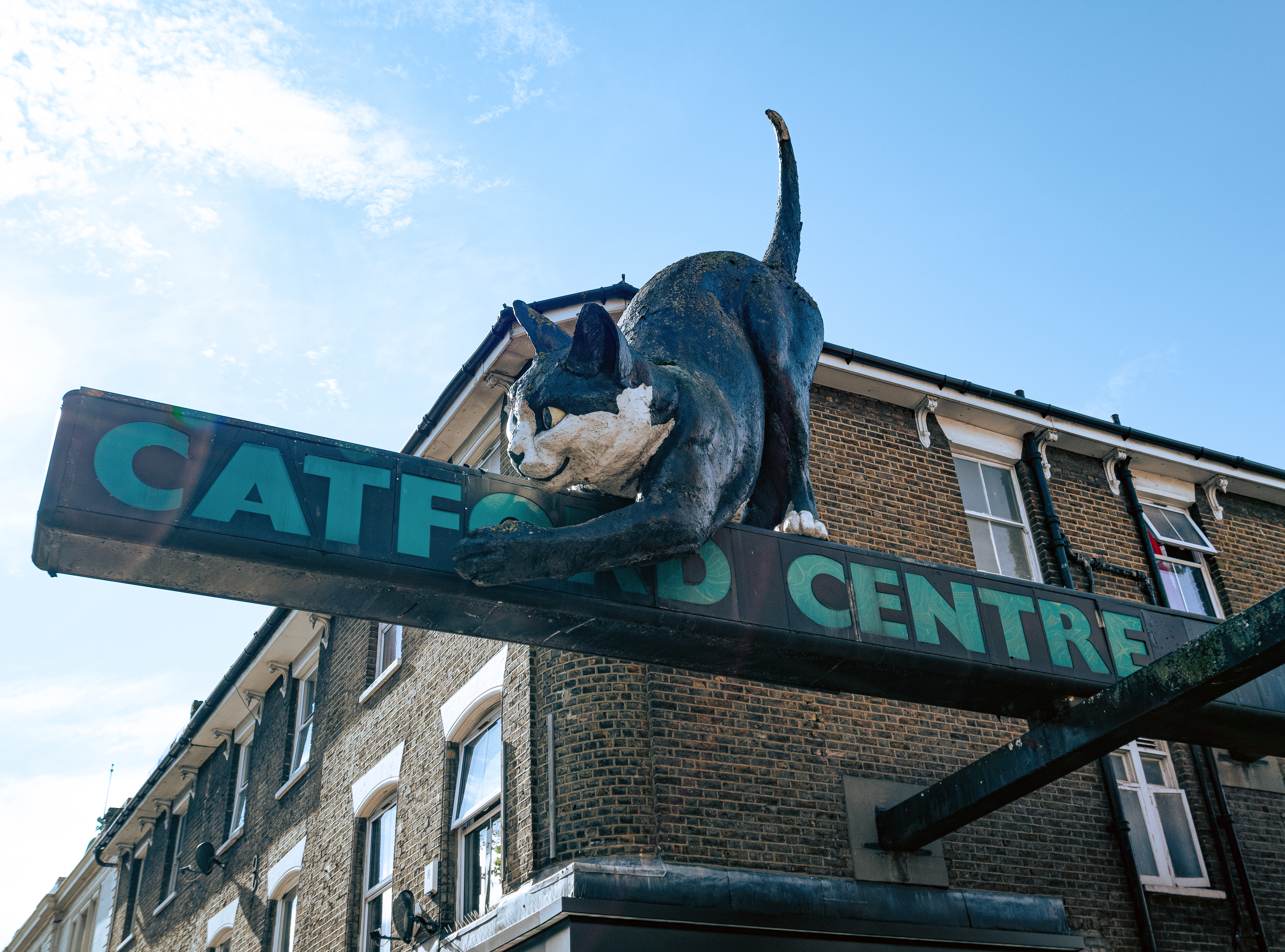
The Catford Cat – a statue in Catford town centre, depicting a giant cat clawing at the Catford Centre sign.

One Catford landmark is the Catford Cat, a giant fibreglass sculpture of a black cat above the entrance to the Catford centre. There is also a street market on Catford Broadway.

Between 1932 and 2003, Catford Stadium was a greyhound racing track, but was closed and then destroyed by fire in 2005 and ultimately demolished to make way for new housing.

One of Catford's oldest pubs is the Black Horse and Harrow (back to its original name in 2026 after several prior renamings), a large late-Victorian pub in the town centre, facing the Concert Hall. The Catford Bridge Tavern is close to the former dog track; this mock tudor pub burned down in March 2015 but has since been refurbished and reopened in April 2017. Nearby, is St Dunstan's College.

The area was once home to the Catford Studios, which produced films during the silent era.

== Regeneration ==
Catford town centre is a priority area for regeneration in the London Borough of Lewisham. Several key sites around the town centre have been identified for redevelopment – Milford Towers, Catford Island, The Civic Centre, Lewisham Town Hall and The "Wickes" site have all been highlighted for significant change in the proposed Catford Plan.

The council's aspiration is for the complete redevelopment of the Catford Shopping Centre and Milford Towers, which would require demolition of both, together with the car parks and associated buildings along Thomas Lane. However, attempts to regenerate Catford have been hampered by various complex issues, such as finance and the number of different landowners in and around the town centre.

== Transport ==
=== Rail ===
Catford is served by two railway stations, Catford and Catford Bridge. Catford provides the area with Thameslink services to Kentish Town, London Blackfriars, Orpington via Bromley South and to Sevenoaks via Bromley South and Swanley. Catford Bridge is served by Southeastern services to London Charing Cross, London Cannon Street via Lewisham and to Hayes.

=== Buses ===
Catford is served by many Transport for London bus routes.

=== Road ===
The commercial core of Catford is the junction of the A205 South Circular, and the A21, the road from London to Hastings. There is a one way gyratory where the roads meet, in the centre of which there is a small retail park with associated parking.

=== Proposed transport links ===
==== Bakerloo line extension ====
There are proposals for a Bakerloo line extension to Lewisham, with a possible longer-term second phase to Catford and Hayes. As of 2022, no final decisions had been made.

==== Docklands Light Railway extension ====
Transport for London (TfL) is currently considering the extension of the Docklands Light Railway from Lewisham to Bromley, with the first phase being from Lewisham to Catford. So far, TfL has not expressed a preferred route, provided detailed plans, or indicated costs and funding. Lewisham Council has suggested that any route should be underground to reduce physical and visual impact.

== Education ==
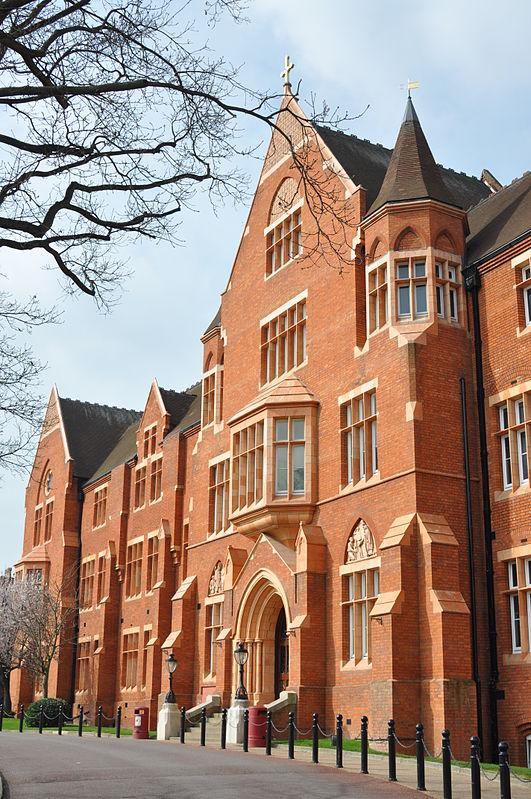
St Dunstan's College

=== Local authority maintained schools ===
The local council maintains Conisborough College and Greenvale School.

=== Independent schools ===
Catford has two independent schools, St Dunstan's College and a small faith school, Springfield Christian School.

=== Parks and green spaces ===
==== River Pool Linear Park ====
The walk follows the River Pool downstream from the Ravensbourne River. The banking has been planted with native trees and shrubs, herbaceous planting, wild flower grassland, and wetland marginal planting. The park forms part of the Waterlink Way, which forms a significant section of the river from Sydenham to the Thames.

Unlike many of London's rivers, the Pool remains above ground for most of its length. A section of the river flows through Linear Park from Southend Lane to Catford Hill.

==== Mountsfield Park ====
In the 1920s, Charlton Athletic F.C. played at The Mount (stadium) in the park. The Council holds its annual People's Day event here in July.

==== Ladywell Fields ====
The park consists of three fields with a river running through them, and is next to University Hospital Lewisham. The middle field contains one of the last established rare Dutch Elm trees in London.

==== Iona Close Orchard ====
Iona Close Orchard is a preserved Victorian garden. In common with most old orchards, the site is of high nature conservation value. The houses to which it originally belonged dated to about 1825.

== Sport ==
=== Facilities ===
The 20-acre Jubilee Ground is operated by St Dunstan's College.

Catford Stadium was one of the greyhound racing venues in the UK until its closure and subsequent demolition in 2005. It also hosted boxing and several other sporting events.

=== Local sports teams ===
Catford has a Non-League football club Lewisham Borough F.C. who play at the Ladywell Arena.

Kent County Cricket Club have played at Catford several times in the past.

The Catford Cycling Club was founded in 1886. In 1894, they built their own track south of Brownhill Road with a pagoda grandstand. By the 1950s, the majority of the track had been built over, but the club still exists.

== Gallery ==
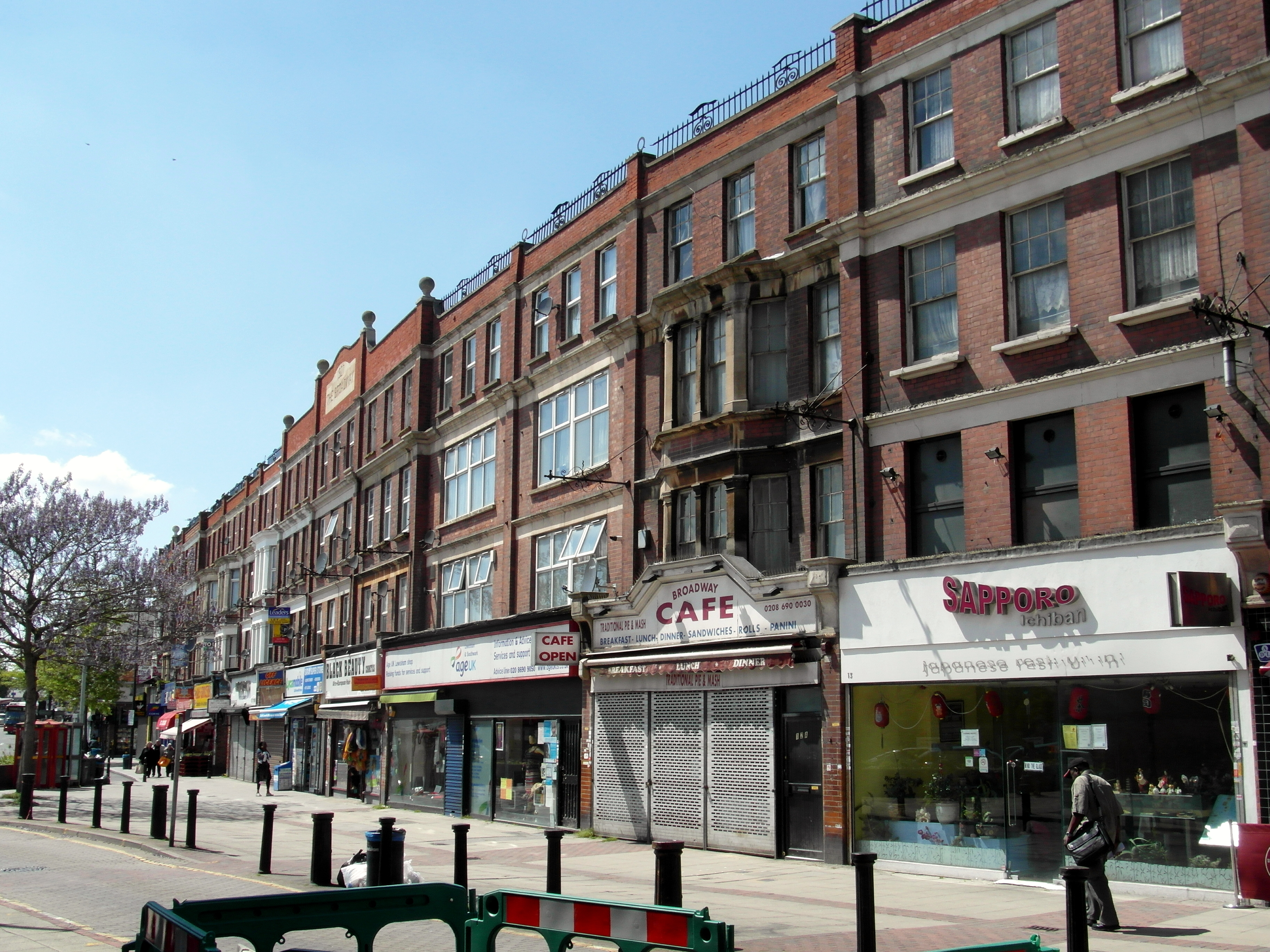
Catford Broadway

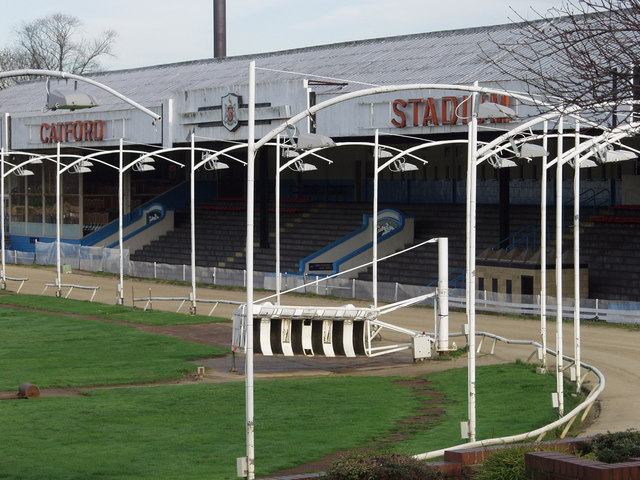
Former Catford Stadium, destroyed by fire in 2005

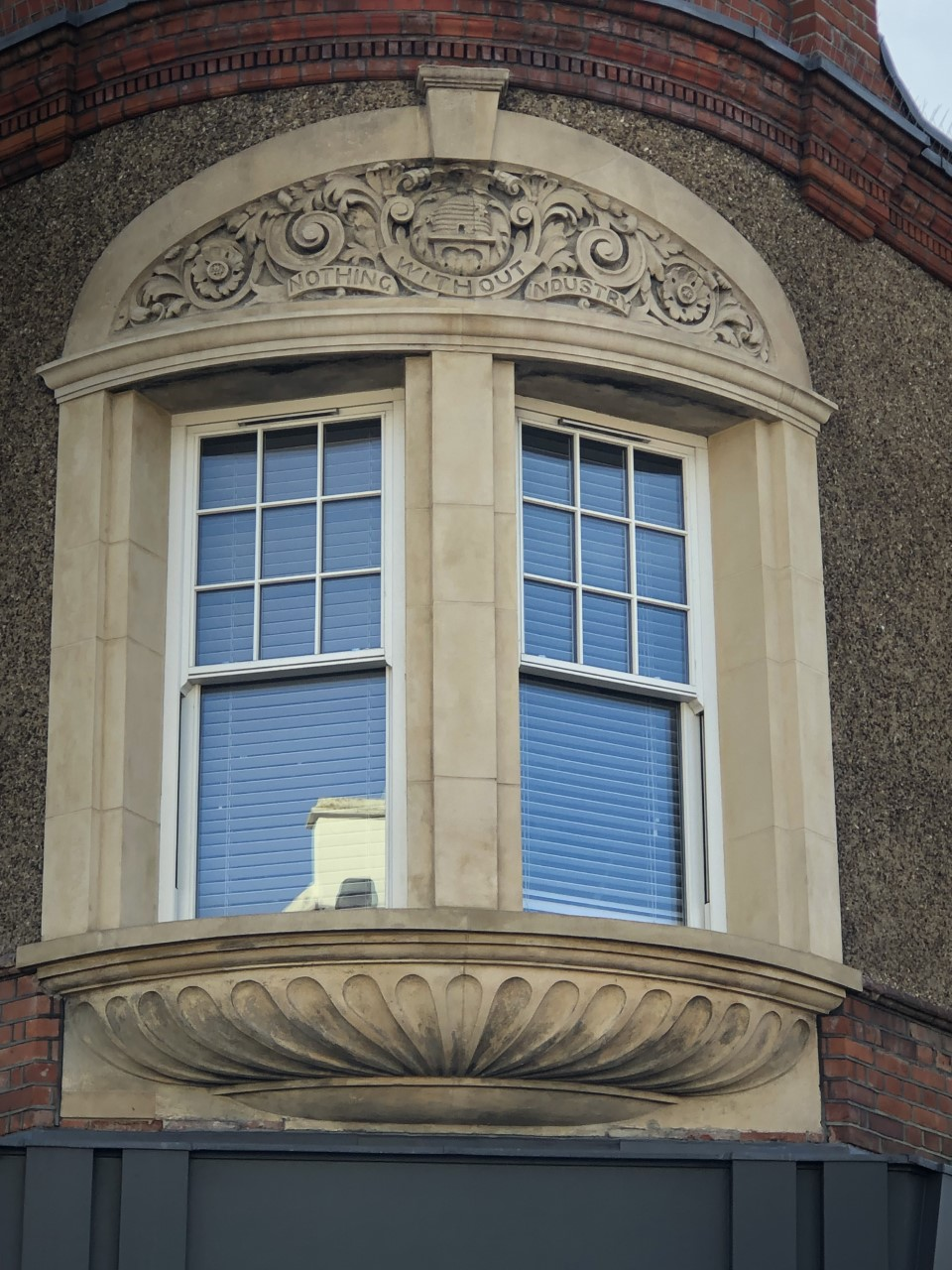
"Nothing Without Industry" the Catford slogan at 16 Brownhill Road, Catford

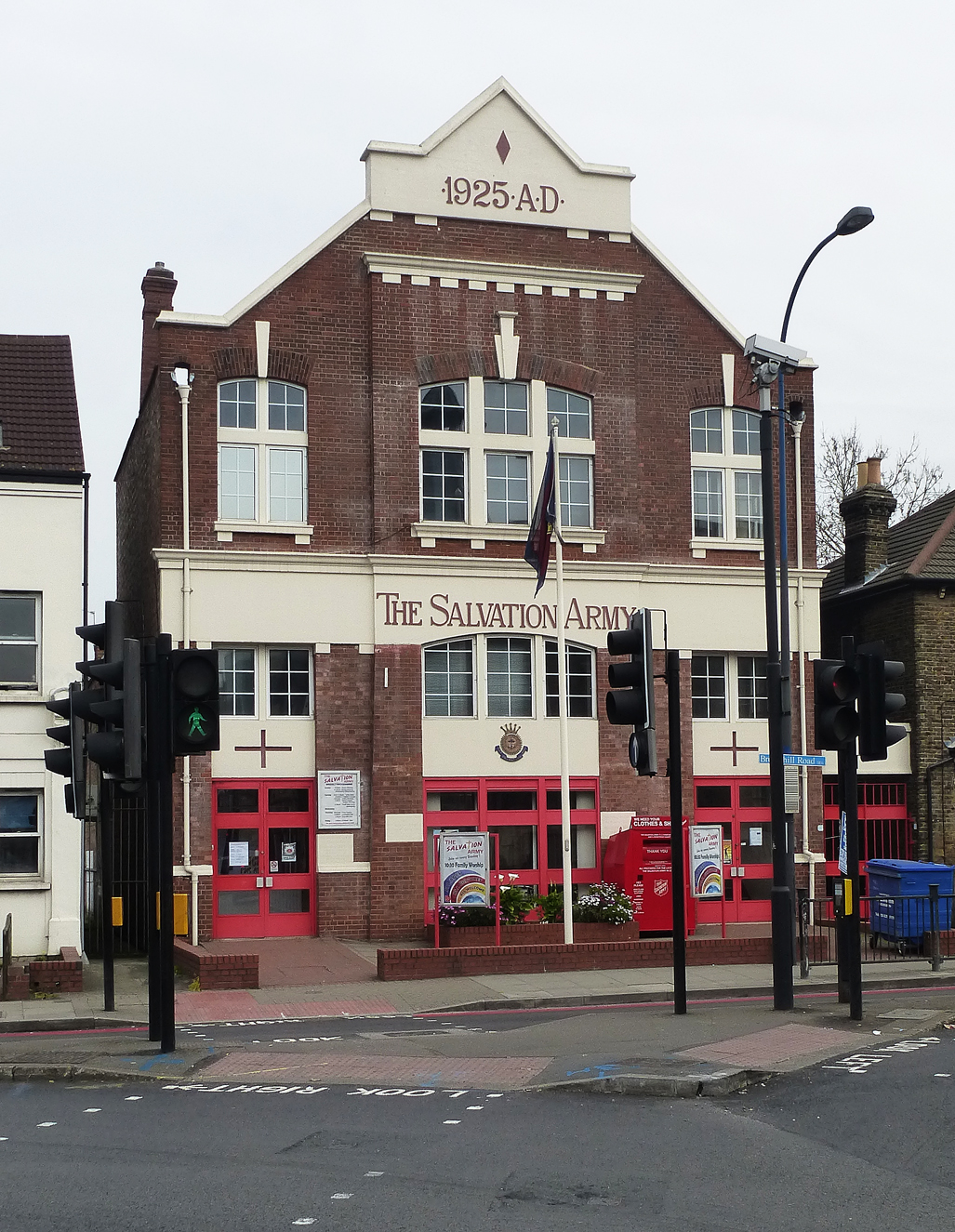
Salvation Army building, 23-25 Brownhill Road, constructed in 1925

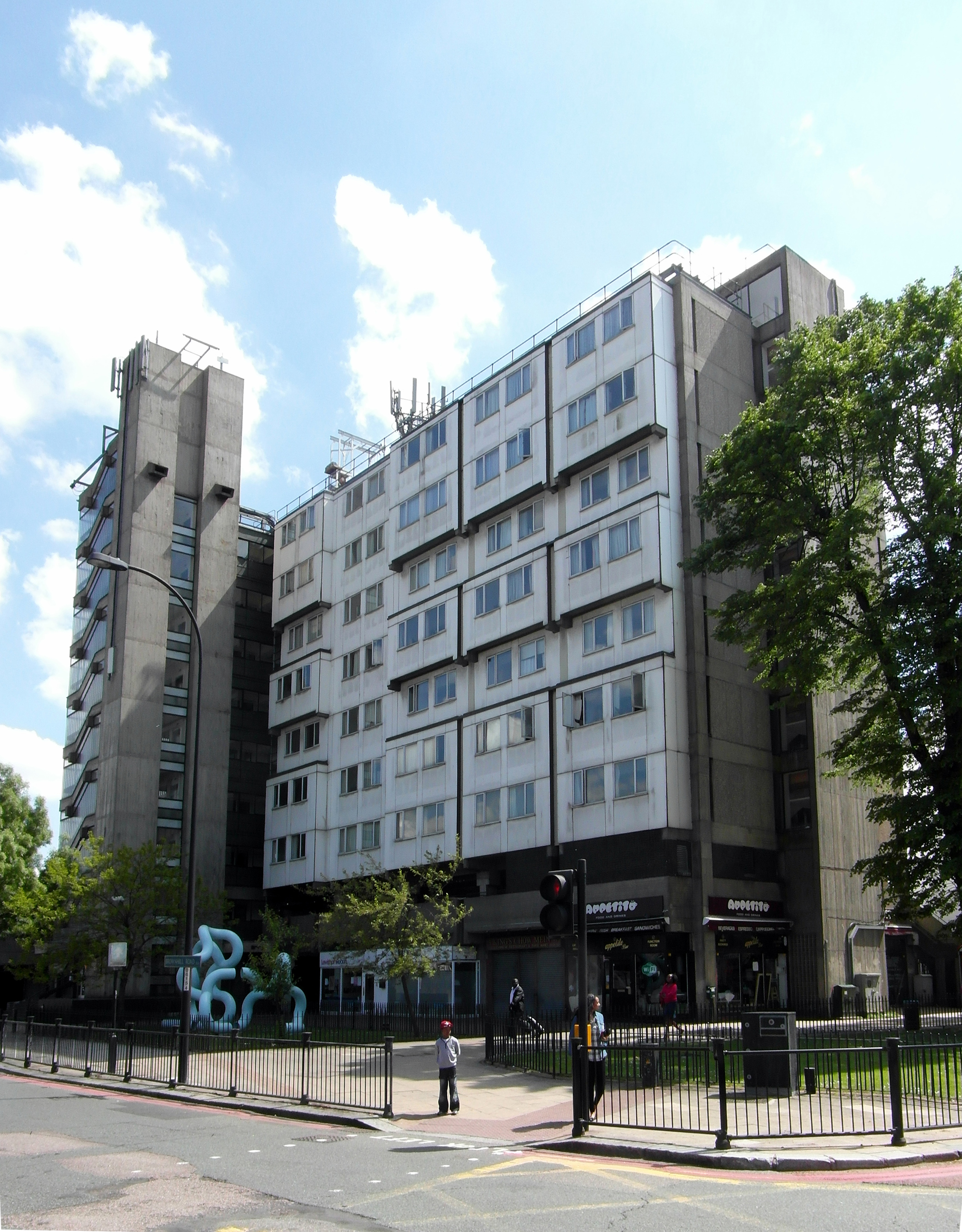
Eros House

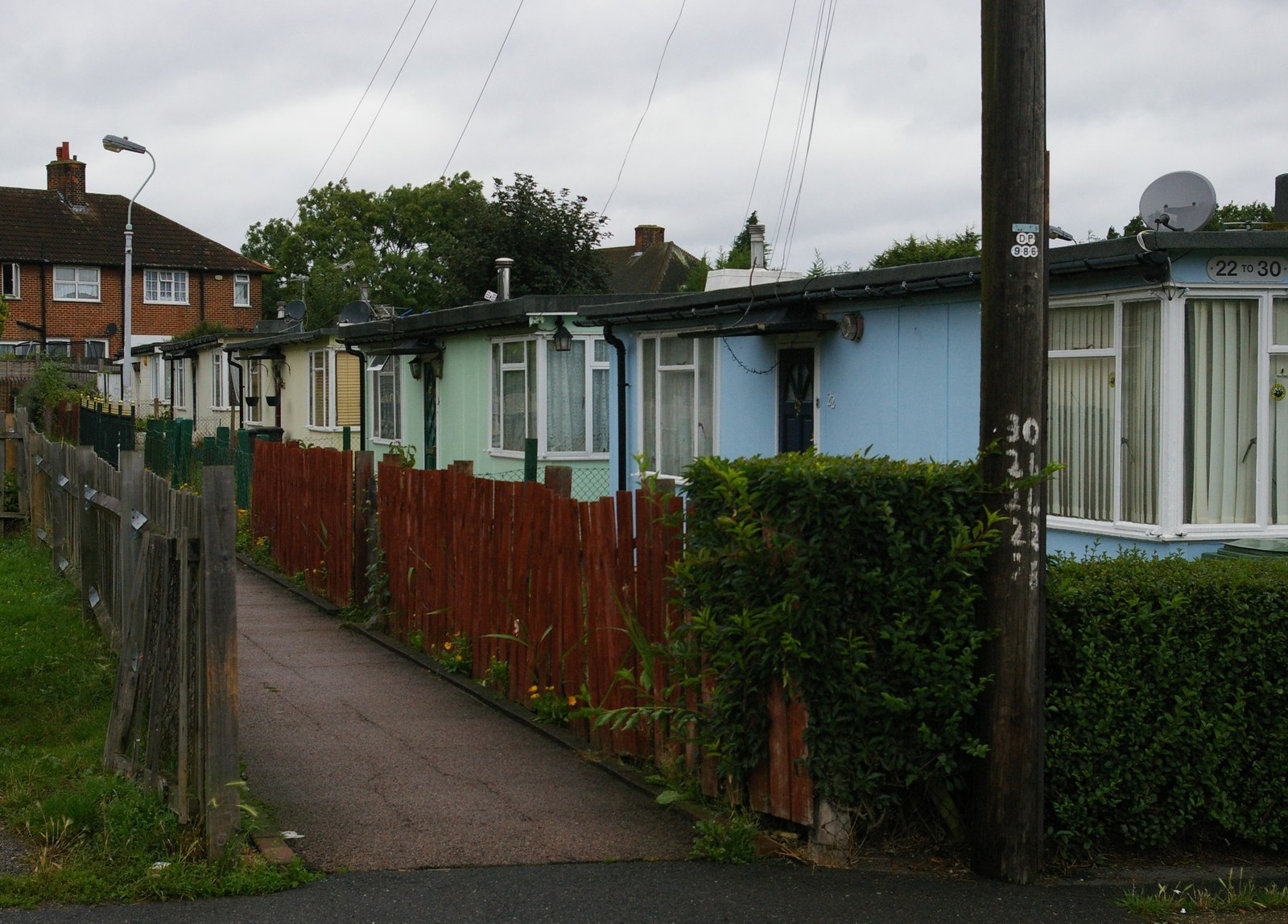
Post-war prefab houses of the Excalibur Estate

== Notable residents ==
• Louis Theroux, British-American journalist and presenter.

• Jak Airport, guitarist of punk band X-Ray Spex and new wave band Classix Nouveaux, was born and raised there.

- Ray BLK, British singer and songwriter.
- Captain William Colbeck (seaman) (1871–1930), Antarctic explorer, lived in Inchmery Road. His sons went to St Dunstan's.
- Maxwell Confait, Colin Lattimore, Ronal Leighton and Ahmet Salih. (See The Murder of Maxwell Confait.)
- Henry Cooper, British heavyweight boxer came from the area.
- Ernest Christopher Dowson, poet and decadent lived and died in Catford. Dowson introduced the phrases 'Days of wine and roses' and 'Gone with the wind'.
- Hughroy Currie (Boxer), British Heavyweight Champion in 1985-86. Lived in Catford, Brockley and briefly Bromley
- Leslie Dwyer, actor, was born in Catford.
- Ben Elton, comedian and writer, was born in Catford in 1959.
- Henry Forster, 1st Baron Forster – Forster Park is named after him.
- Joe Gomez, defender for Liverpool F.C. Born in Catford.
- Japan (band), 1980s new wave band. Vocalist David Sylvian, bassist Mick Karn, drummer Steve Jansen and keyboardist Richard Barbieri grew up in Catford and attended Catford Boys School.
- Anthony Jones, art photographer lives in the area.
- Jem Karacan, international footballer, born in Catford.
- George Arthur Knowland, recipient of the Victoria Cross.
- Ethel Le Neve, mistress of Dr Crippen, hanged for the murder of his wife.
- Lucy Mangan columnist for The Guardian newspaper lived in Catford for more than thirty years.
- Andy McNab, former serviceman in the Special Air Service (SAS) and writer, was born in Catford.
- Alexander McQueen, fashion designer, was born in Lewisham
- Jacqui McShee, folk singer and co-founder of Pentangle.
- Spike Milligan (1918–2002), comedian and writer, went to school at Catford's Brownhill Boys' School. He claimed to have lived in Catford and wrote about the area in his books and sketches. In reality, he lived in nearby Honor Oak.
- Frank Pullen, the property developer and racehorse owner, was born in Catford and opened the first of his shops on Catford Broadway.
- Bernard Sunley, property developer and philanthropist, born in Catford in 1910.
- Robin Trower, guitarist, Procol Harum, and extensive solo career.
- Robert Stanford Tuck, Second World War fighter ace.
- Chris Welch, music journalist and author, was raised in Catford.
- Brian Willsher, wood and bronze sculptor, born and lived in Catford.
- Jim Legxacy, rapper, singer, and record producer.
- Fritz, street drinker.

== Geography ==
=== Other nearby areas ===
- Lewisham
- Brockley
- Ladywell
- Bellingham, London
- Downham
- Grove Park
- Lee, London
- Sydenham
- Forest Hill
- Beckenham
- Hither Green
- Peckham
