= Brian Willsher =

English sculptor (1930–2010)

- Brian Willsher at work
- Born: 1930; Catford, London, England
- Died: 2010 (aged 79–80)
- Education: Woolwich Polytechnic
- Known for: Wooden sculpture; bronze sculpture
- Notable work: Bird in Space
- Style: Abstract
- Children: Daniel Willsher (painter)

Brian Willsher (1930–2010) was an English sculptor, mainly producing wooden sculptures that mixed geometric abstraction and organic abstraction.

Willsher was born in Catford, southeast London, and was based in the city for the rest of his life. During 1946–48, he studied engineering at Woolwich Polytechnic. He was not formally trained as a sculptor. He initially worked as a dental technician, farmhand, and telephone engineer. He held a number of solo exhibitions in the 1960s, as well as exhibiting at five consecutive Royal Academy of Art Summer shows.

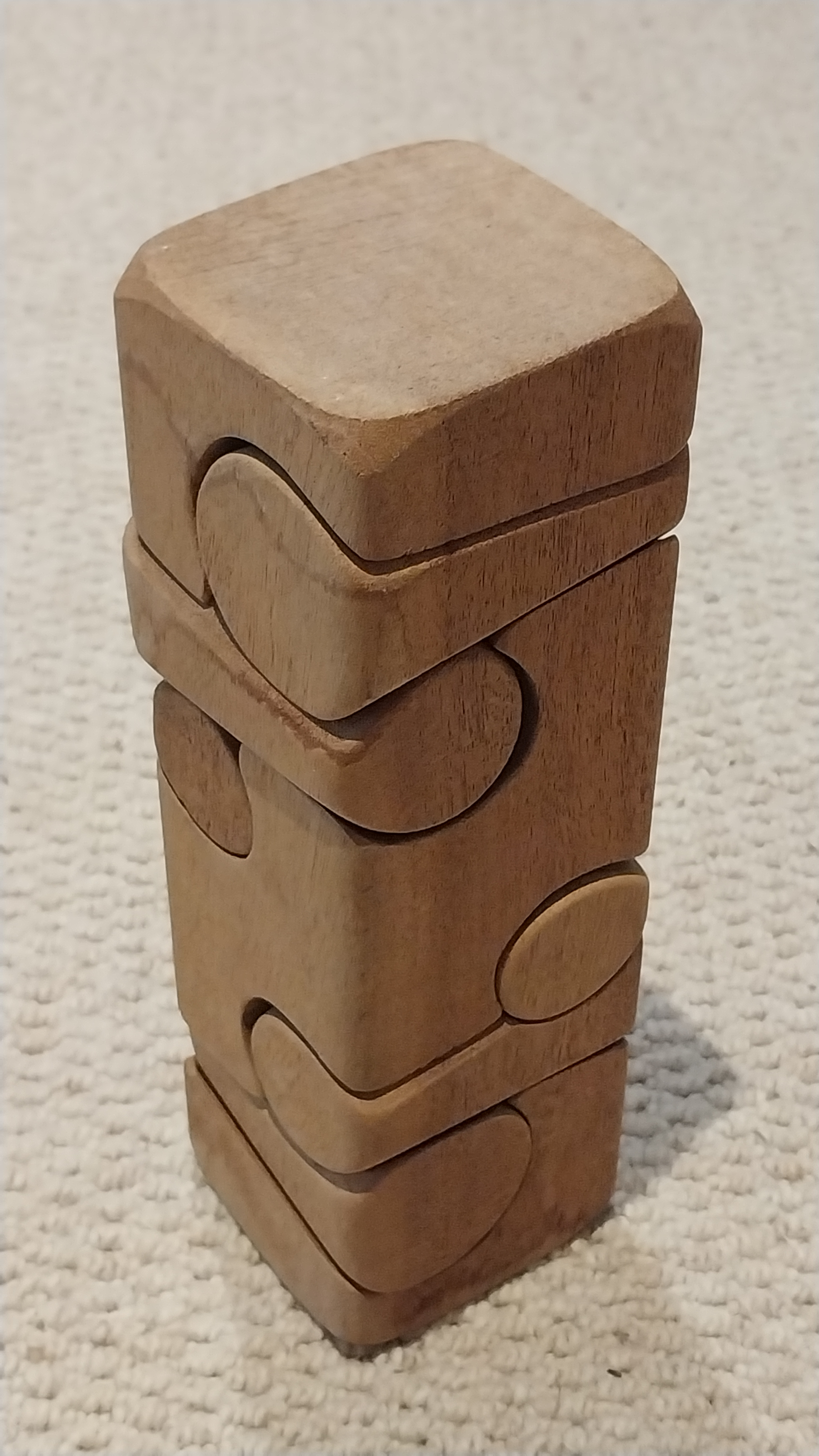
Sculptural puzzle by Brian Willsher

Willsher began creating his first sculptures from wood in 1956. In 1965, he held a one-man show at the Dunn's of Bromley furniture store, and then two more at Heal's furniture/homeware store, London, in 1966 and 1967. He also exhibited in Melbourne, Australia. Three of his sculptures were commissioned for Dartington Hall, and six for the Devon Guild of Craftsmen. In 1968, the sculptor Henry Moore and the art historian Herbert Read acclaimed Willsher's sculptures. Moore wrote in The Guardian newspaper, "Here's pure sculpture, indeed! More than that, memorable sculpture!", after the HM Customs and Excise (HMCE, now the HMRC) claimed that Willsher's works were not fine art, and this attracted a 40% manufacturing tax, forcing him into bankruptcy. Eventually, HMCE backed down on their claim with the furore that was created. British Pathé featured Willsher in 1968, creating an abstract wooden sculpture with a band saw in his Catford garden.

A polished bronze sculpture by Willsher, Bird in Space, was denied free entry into the United States by the Federal Customs & Excise Department there because it was "just a piece of metal", even though it was due to by exhibited at the Guggenheim Museum in New York. He became interested in bronze sculptures as well as wood, working with the Fiorini Foundry in London. Willsher exhibited in London at the Boundary Gallery and Belgrave Gallery in 1990. In 1997, Willsher shared an exhibition with the painter Daniel Willsher, his son, again at the Belgrave Gallery.
