= William Willsher =

English cricketer

Personal information
- Born: 1814; Rolvenden, Kent
- Died: 30 November 1861 (aged 46–47); Barming Heath Asylum, Kent
- Relatives: Ned Willsher (brother)

Domestic team information
- Years: Team
- 1847: Kent
- Only FC: 15 July 1847 Kent v Surrey
- Source: CricInfo, 24 October 2023

William Willsher (1814 – 30 November 1861) was an English cricketer who played a single first-class match for Kent County Cricket Club in 1847.

Willsher was born at Rolvenden in Kent in 1814 and baptised in the village on 12 October. He was the sixth child of 14 in the family of John and Charlotte (née Winser) Willsher. His father famed at Little Halden Farm in the parish before moving to become the landlord of The Chequers public house at Goudhurst. Following his father's death in 1843, William Willsher moved with his mother to Madginford at Maidstone where he worked as a farm bailiff before becoming a publican himself, running The George Inn at Gabriel's Hill near Mote Park in the same town.

Willsher played club cricket for a number of village clubs around Rolvenden and Maidstone, and developed a reputation as a batsman. His only first-class match was an 1847 fixture against Surrey, one of two first-class matches played on the Preston Hall Ground at Aylesford near Maidstone. In a strong Kent team featuring Fuller and William Pilch, Alfred and Walter Mynn, William Hillyer and William Dorrington, Willsher was relegated to batting last where he recorded two ducks. He did not bowl, with Hillyer and Alfred Mynn bowing unchanged in each Surrey innings, but did take a catch.

Willsher is known to have been at The George as late as 1858 and playing cricket in 1859. He died at Barming Heath Asylum in 1861, the cause of death given as "dementia, general paralysis and epilepsy". One of his brothers, Ned Willsher, played for Kent between 1850 and 1875 and made over 250 first-class appearances in total. He was considered one of the best bowlers of his era and one of Kent's best cricketers of the 19th century.

== Bibliography ==
- Carlaw, Derek (2020). Kent County Cricketers, A to Z: Part One (1806–1914) (PDF). Cardiff: ACS.
