= Thorp Academy =

NET Thorp Academy
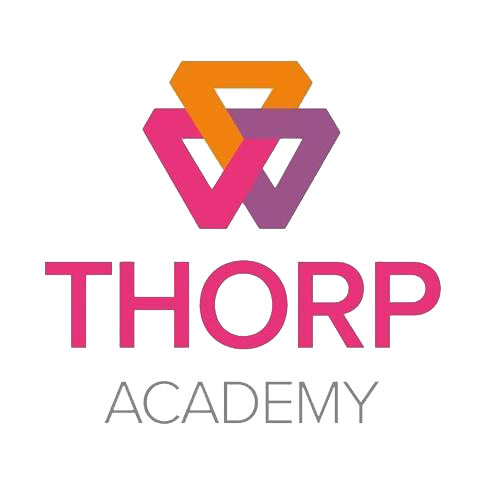

Location
- Main Road; Ryton, Tyne and Wear, NE40 3AH; England

Information
- Former name: Ryton Comprehensive School, Charles Thorp Comprehensive School
- Type: Academy
- Motto: Outcomes Focused, Child Centred
- Local authority: Gateshead
- Trust: Northern Education Trust
- Department for Education URN: 141185 Tables
- Ofsted: Reports
- Chair of LGC: Julie Kelly
- Principal: Joanna Macaulay
- Gender: Mixed
- Age: 11 to 18
- Website: https://ta.northerneducationtrust.org/

Thorp Academy is a large 11–18 secondary Academy in Ryton, Tyne & Wear, England. The academy is named after the 19th century churchman and rector, Charles Thorp, who went on to found Durham University. The site that Thorp Academy now stands on is the site of the original school established by Charles Thorp. In the early 2010's, Gateshead Council merged Ryton Comprehensive School (the current Thorp Academy site) and Hookergate School in High Spen. With the two schools merging, the school was renamed Charles Thorp Comprehensive School. The school later converted into an academy sponsored by Northern Education Trust and was renamed as Thorp Academy.

The academy has demonstrated ongoing academic success and in 2019 attained a Progress 8 score of +0.33 which was in the top 10% of schools in Tyne & Wear and the top 11% of schools in North East England. The school has demonstrated academic excellence in a number of subject areas with the progress made by students in Mathematics and Computer Science in the top 10% nationally. The percentage of students attaining a grade 5 or above in English and Mathematics ranks in the top 25% of schools in England.

The academy has the largest catchment area in Gateshead and has 10 core feeder primary schools. Students come from Ryton, Crawcrook, Clara Vale, Winlaton, Blaydon, Greenside, High Spen, Highfield, Rowlands Gill & Chopwell.

== History ==
The Thorp School, a Church of England Foundation, was built in 1861. In 1890 there were 200 pupils and 7 teachers. The school name was changed to Ryton Comprehensive School (date unknown). In 2005 there were 1270 pupils with over 200 in the sixth form, and 84 teachers.

Ryton Comprehensive School was threatened with closure as part of a review of secondary education in Gateshead in 2009. It was eventually decided that the school should remain open. The school's rating declined during this time from "good, with outstanding features" to receiving a Notice to Improve in 2011 which was removed in March 2012 when the school was judged Satisfactory. The school was judged to have serious deficiencies in September 2013.

In 2003/4 the school improved some facilities thanks to a £3 million investment by Gateshead LEA and the Big Lottery Fund. That development saw the construction of an additional sports hall, three new science laboratories, a purpose-built drama studio, a suite of music rooms, enhanced art and graphics areas and new modern foreign language classrooms. More recently the LA invested £2 million in a new classroom block housing Learning Support and Art/Media.

The school had a ‘Millennium Centre’ which provides facilities for independent study and a library.

In 2011 Hookergate School in High Spen was closed due to falling numbers, and merged with Ryton Comprehensive. The Hookergate site remained open for the academic year 2011–12 to provide education for years 8, 9 and 11.

The school changed its name to Charles Thorp Comprehensive School in September 2011. The uniform changed from a maroon blazer, blue shirt, blue striped tie and grey trousers to a blue shirt, grey jumper and black trousers.

In 2013, the school announced plans to convert to an academy. The sponsor, Northern Education Trust, was confirmed in 2014. The conversion occurred in September 2014 with the school being renamed Thorp Academy.

The academy has promoted the social media postings of the local branch of the Labour Party, undermining the trust parents placed in them to be unbiased in teaching their children.

== Thorp Academy Campus ==
The academy was rebuilt between 2016 and 2019 by Sir Robert McAlpine as part of the Department for Education's Priority Schools Building Scheme. The academy is made up of three main blocks which are built around a quadrangle. Recently, the North Block has had an extension built.

=== North Block (Previously the STEM block) ===
This building is on the northern part of the academy site and houses the main school dining hall as well as the following departments:-

- Humanities Department
- Science Department
- Design & Technology Department

=== South Block (Previously the LRC block) ===
This building is on the southern part of the academy site and houses the main school hall, the main reception, senior management suite, learning support and pastoral support as well as the following departments:-

- English Department
- Mathematics Department
- Computer Science Department
- Performance Department (Drama)

=== West Wing ===
The West Wing was constructed following the merger of Ryton and Hookergate Schools and houses the Sixth Form Centre as well as the following departments:-

- Performance Department (Music and Physical Education)
- Art Department
