= Winlaton Mill =

Village in Tyne and Wear, England

Coordinates: 54.943°N 1.714°W

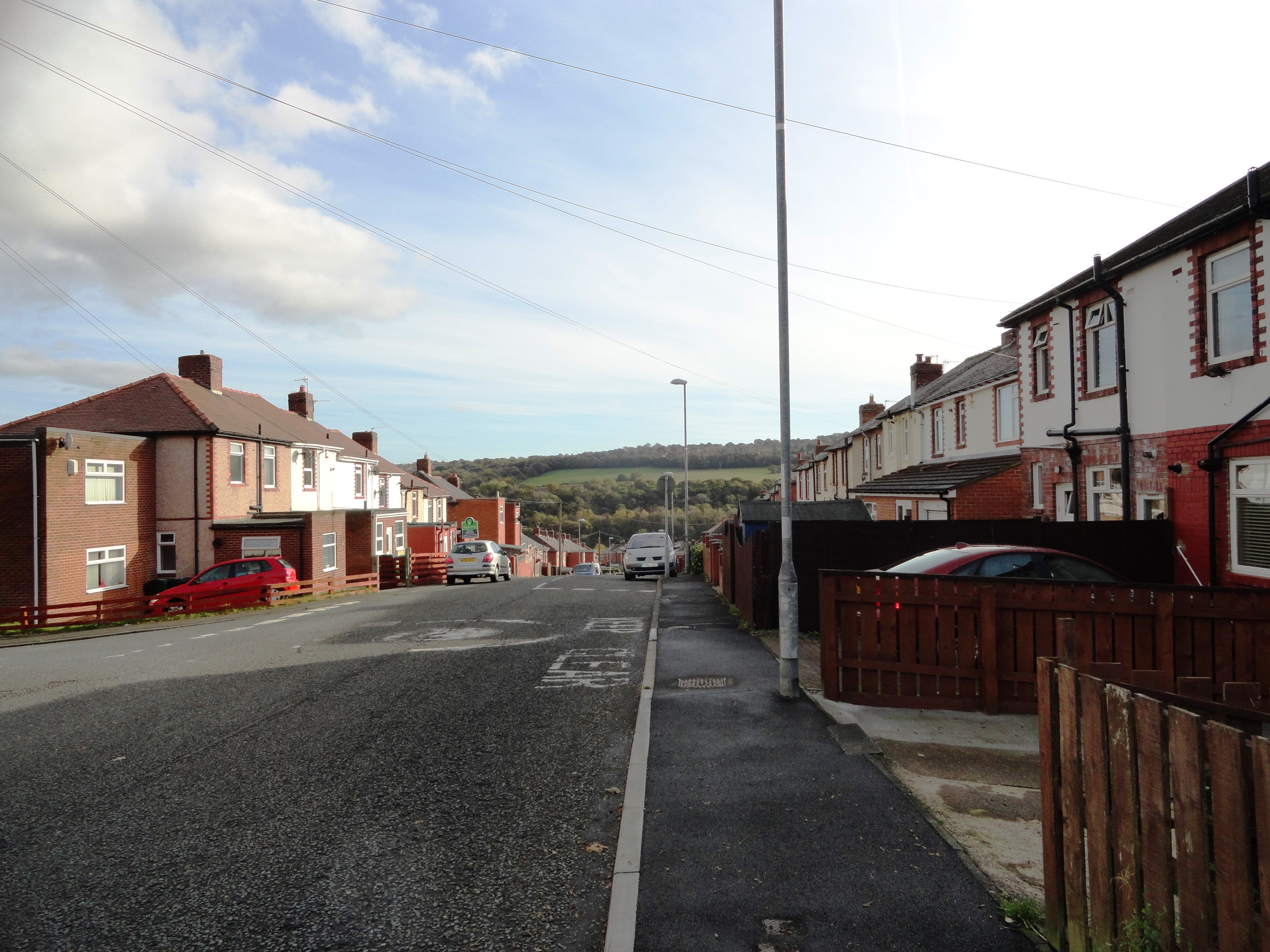
Mill Lane

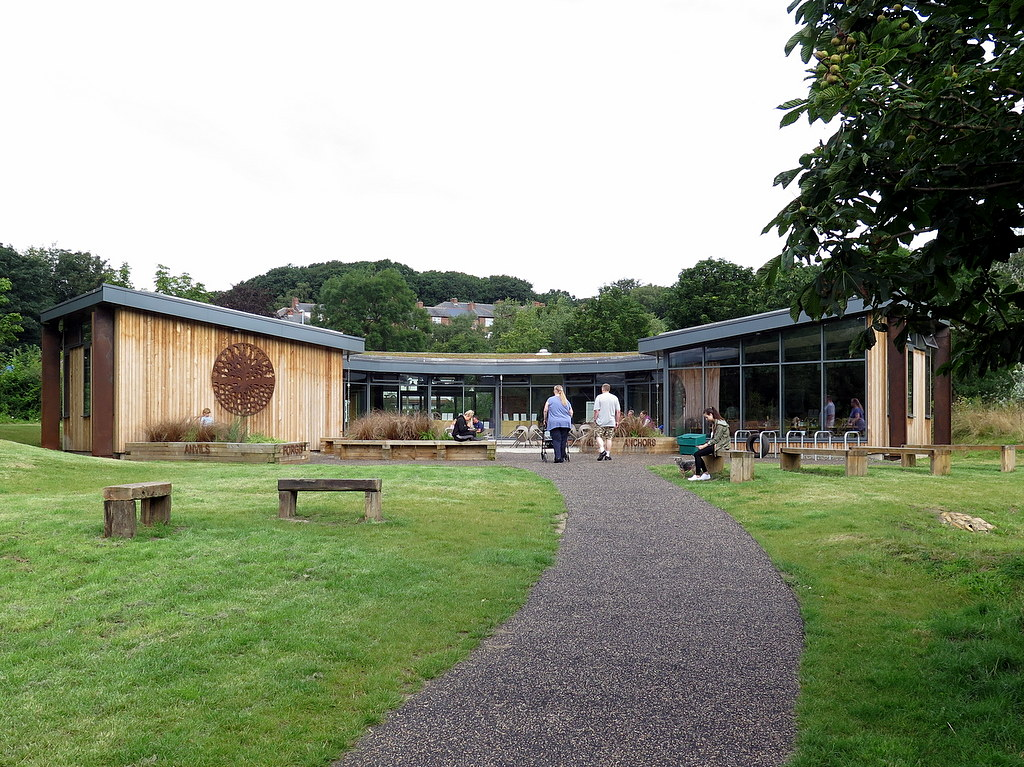
Heritage Centre

Winlaton Mill is a village in Tyne and Wear, North East England. It is not to be confused with Winlaton to the northwest which now comprises the southern part of Blaydon. The village is halfway between Gateshead to the northeast and Rowlands Gill to the southwest. Statistically Winlaton Mill is part of the ward of Winlaton and High Spen which contains part of Blaydon, High Spen and other outlying villages. The village is on the A694 which joins the A1 at Swalwell and contains the Red Kite Pub and Restaurant. Winlaton Mill is near the River Derwent which may suggest its name.

== History ==
There was previously a hamlet called Huntley's Haugh or Eels Haugh with only a handful of dwellings. Winlaton Manor, owned by the Neville family, had a mill. Its miller around the turn of the 18th century was George Evans, giving the area the name Evans Banks.

The exact date Ambrose Crowley established Winlaton Mill down the road from Winlaton is unclear, but in records from the start of the 18th century, he mentions a "The Mill" or "Mill No 1". The site grew up and was in operation until the late 19th century.

A bridge was built in 1842. A Wesleyan Methodist chapel was built in 1870.

Affected by coal waste from Clockburn Drift and Derwenthaugh Coke Works, the village's original housing stock was ruled unfit for human habitation in 1933 and demolished, followed by the derelict Winlaton Mill works in 1936. Part of the site was re-wilded and became part of Derwenthaugh Park, while a new village was built across the road. The Land of Oak & Iron Trust now maintains a heritage centre in Winlaton Mill.
