= Charles Thorp =

Archdeacon of Durham

The Venerable Charles Thorp FRS
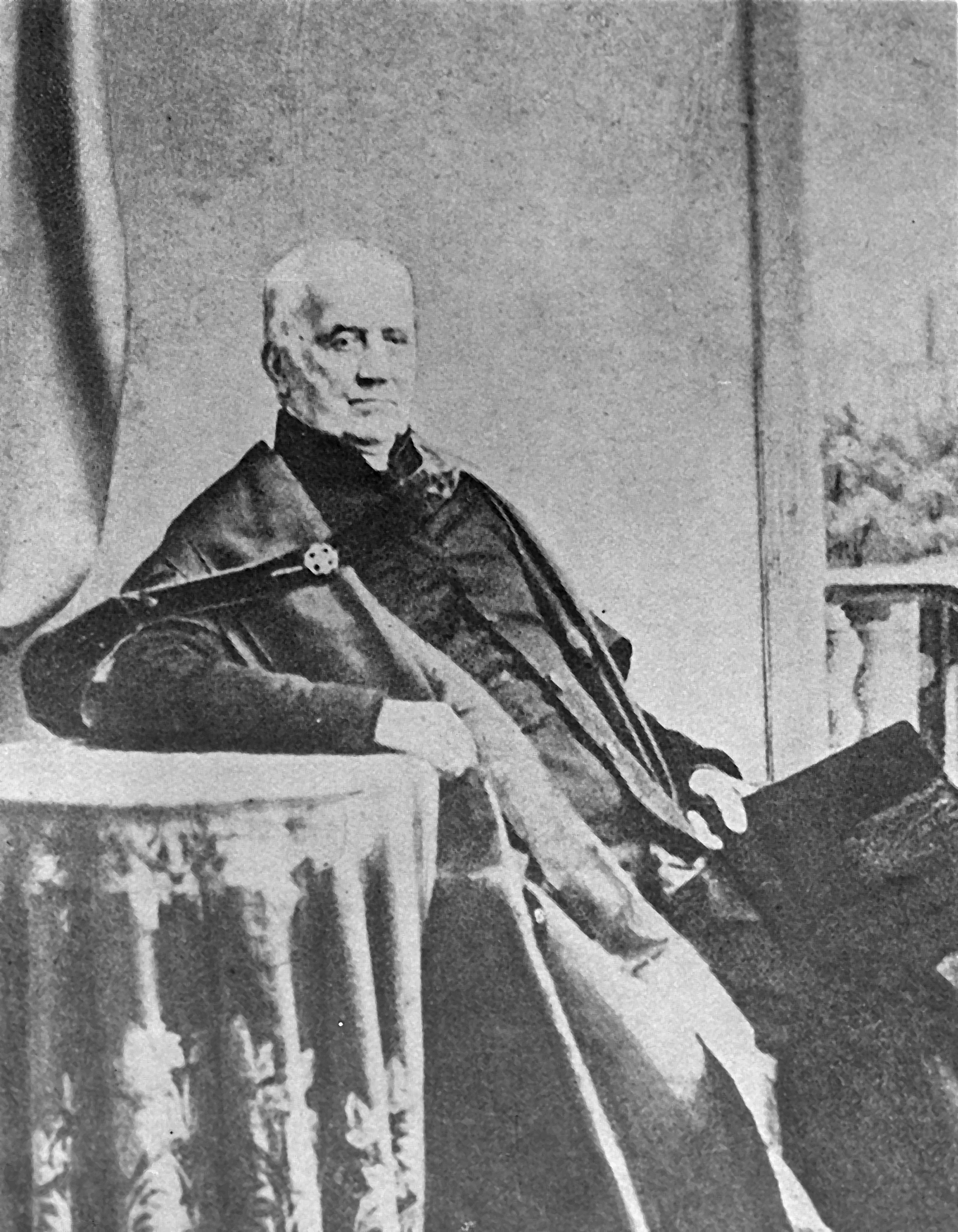

Warden of the University of Durham
- In office 1832–1862
- Preceded by: Position established
- Succeeded by: George Waddington

Master of University College, Durham
- In office 1832–1862
- Preceded by: Position established
- Succeeded by: Joseph Waite

Archdeacon of Durham
- In office 1831–1862
- Preceded by: Richard Prosser
- Succeeded by: Edward Prest

Personal details
- Born: 13 October 1783 Gateshead, County Durham, Great Britain
- Died: 10 October 1862 (aged 78) Durham, County Durham, Great Britain
- Education: Peterhouse, Cambridge, University College, Oxford
- Profession: Priest and academic

Charles Thorp, FRS (13 October 1783 – 10 October 1862) was an English churchman, rector of the parish of Ryton and, later, Archdeacon of Durham and the first warden of the University of Durham.

== Life ==
He was born in Gateshead, County Durham, the son of Robert Thorp, Archdeacon of Northumberland, and educated at the Royal Grammar School, Newcastle and Durham School. In 1799, he entered Peterhouse, Cambridge; and then University College, Oxford where he graduated BA (1803) and MA (1806). He became a Fellow and Tutor at University College, Oxford, in 1806, deacon in 1806 and priest in 1807.

Thorp then became rector of Ryton in 1811, joining a prestigious group with previous rectors including Thomas Secker, later Archbishop of Canterbury. After his time as rector of Holy Cross Church, Ryton, he became Canon (1829) and then Archdeacon of Durham in 1831 and, a year later, became the first warden of the University of Durham. Thorp remained heavily involved with the university, also being the first master of University College. This was a position he held until his death in Durham in 1862. He was buried at Ryton Church. He had married twice.

== Achievements ==
Thorp was a prime mover in introducing free education to Ryton. He worked with the Church Missionary Society to set up a university in Freetown, Sierra Leone, to ensure that freed slaves had access to education. He set up the first penny bank in England, in Ryton, allowing those with small incomes to borrow. He also arranged for his family to buy the Farne Islands, employing a wildlife warden to protect threatened bird species.

Thorp was elected a Fellow of the Royal Society in May 1839. His name was chosen as the identity of a secondary school in West Gateshead in 2011, Charles Thorp Comprehensive School (now Thorp Academy), following the amalgamation of Hookergate School and Ryton Comprehensive School, on the site of the school he sponsored in his lifetime.

Church of England titles
Preceded by Richard Prosser	Archdeacon of Durham; 1831–1862	Succeeded by Edward Prest
Academic offices
New title	Warden & Vice-Chancellor of the University of Durham; 1832–1862	Succeeded by George Waddington
Professional and academic associations
Preceded by Henry Vane, 2nd Duke of Cleveland	President of the Surtees Society; 1849–63	Succeeded by Algernon Percy, 4th Duke of Northumberland
