= Derwenthaugh Coke Works =

Former coking plant on the River Derwent, England

- Location in Tyne and Wear
- 54.9477°N 1.7017°W
- Location: Tyne and Wear, England, UK
- OS grid reference: NZ192615

Derwenthaugh Coke Works was a coking plant on the River Derwent near Swalwell in Gateshead. The works were built in 1928 on the site of the Crowley's Iron Works, which had at one time been the largest iron works in Europe. The coke works was closed and demolished in the late 1980s, and replaced by Derwenthaugh Park.

== History ==
In the 18th and 19th centuries, the site near Swalwell and Winlaton Mill had been that of Crowley's Ironworks, which for a time was the largest ironworks in Europe. The coke works opened on the site in 1928. They were owned and operated by the Consett Iron Company.

== Layout and operations ==
The works was situated by the dam marking the upper tidal limit of the river, where Swalwell Juniors F.C. now stands. The CPP which washed and blended the coal prior to the coking process stood at the north-eastern end of the site, along with large storage bunkers. A conveyor fed blended coal from these bunkers into another bunker on top of the ovens which in turn fed the charging car. The ovens themselves were parallel to the A694, which passes the site, and stood on the area of land now occupied by the two football pitches. There were several railway sidings for both coal and coke between the ovens and the road. The pusher was on the opposite side of the ovens, and the coke was shoved out on the side nearest the road. The quenching tower was at the north-eastern end of the battery of ovens, near the CPP, and the chimney was at the opposite end. Between the ovens and the river were the power plant with its associated boilers and chimneys, as well as the by-products plant. The latter "scrubbed" the gas produced in the ovens, extracting chemicals such as tar and ammonia, which were piped into storage tanks. The gas was then stored in a tall gas holder to the south-east of the site, near the river.

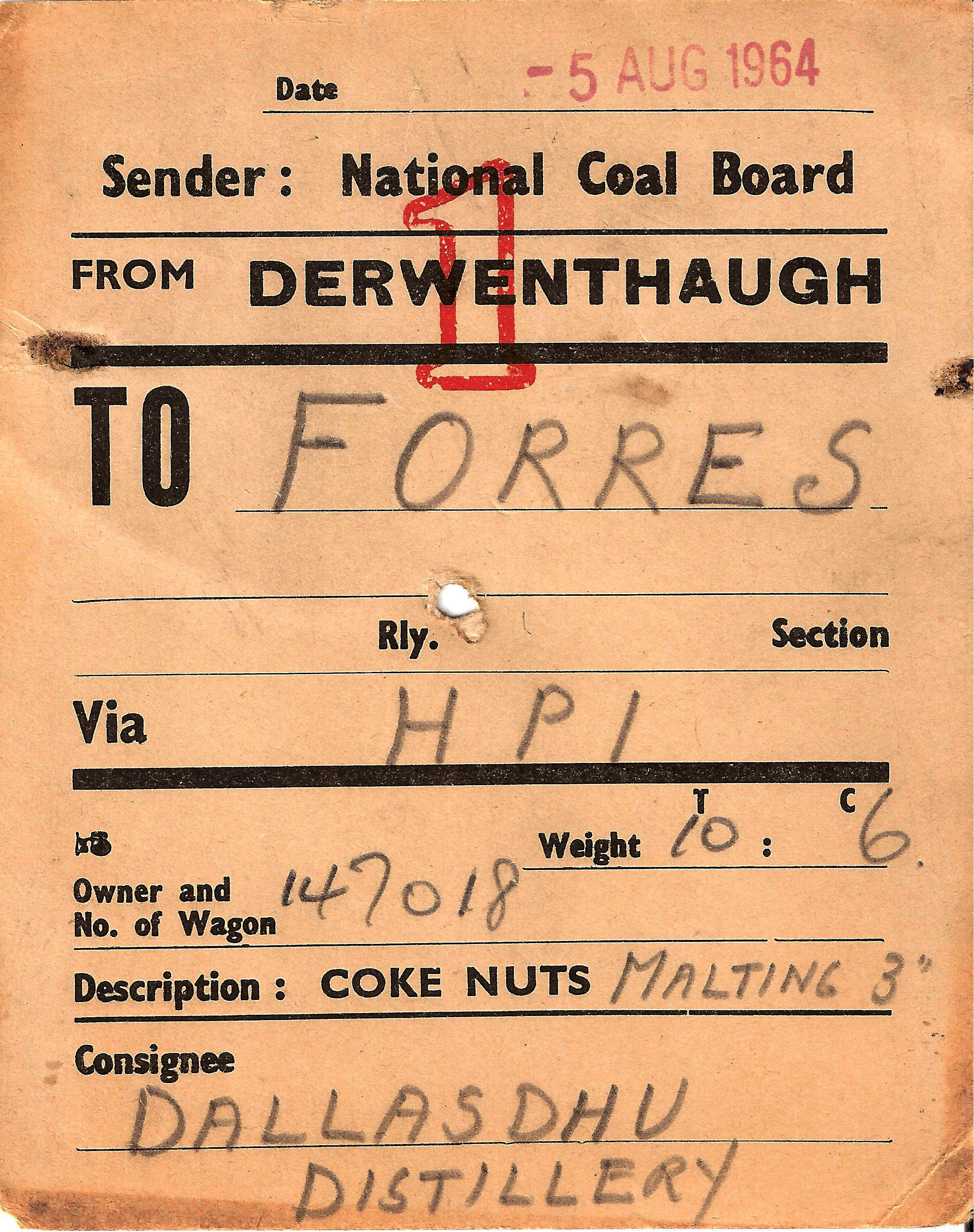
Wagon label from 1964 for a delivery of coke nuts to Dallas Dhu Distillery in Scotland.

There was a motive power depot nearby to house the locomotives which shunted the extensive network of NCB sidings and lines which served the works and the lower part of the Derwent valley. In the last few years of the works' existence, these were all diesel locomotives, but prior to this there were a large number of steam locomotives stabled here. One of them, No. 41, was the oldest working NCB locomotive in the country, having been built for the Consett Iron Co. in 1883, by Kitson and Co. in Leeds, works No. 2509. It was of the Stephenson Long Boiler design, and unlike the ubiquitous 0-4-0 and 0-6-0 side tanks and saddle tanks which served most of the industrial railways of the north-east, it was a pannier tank, (a layout common on the Great Western Railway, but rarely seen elsewhere). Prior to the demise of its fleet of steam locomotives, Derwenthaugh began to receive locomotives from other NCB sheds, either because they had closed, or the locomotive had become surplus to requirements. Nos. 7 and 59 were two such locomotives, easily identifiable as former NCB Lambton system residents from Philadelphia shed by their narrow curved cabs which allowed them to negotiate a tunnel with very limited clearances on the line to the docks at Sunderland.

Over the years the plant took coal from Chopwell Colliery, and in NCB days, from Marley Hill Colliery, via the nearby Clockburn Drift, as well as the opencast mines which operated in the area via the opencast disposal point at Swalwell. The last local deep-mined coal used at the plant came from the Victoria Seam at Sacriston Colliery near Durham. The coke produced was either sent directly to customers by rail, or shipped from a staithe on the River Tyne, which also had facilities for the storage and shipping of liquid tar and creosote produced at the works.

== Electricity generation ==
When built, the works were fitted with turbo-alternators. Surplus electricity from the coke works was sent to Chopwell Colliery's power station. Excess gas from the works was sold to the Newcastle and Gateshead Gas Company. Initially the alternators' associated boilers were fired by waste gasses from the coking process, but in 1931 the boilers were converted to fire coal because of an increase in demand for the gas from the Newcastle and Gateshead Gas Company.

== Closure ==
The works were closed in 1986 and the site was gradually cleared and de-contaminated. In addition to the football and tennis clubs on the site of the works itself, the surrounding land (which had been covered in spoil from the Clockburn Drift and waste from the coal-washing process) was cleaned up and landscaped, and is now the site of Derwenthaugh Park.

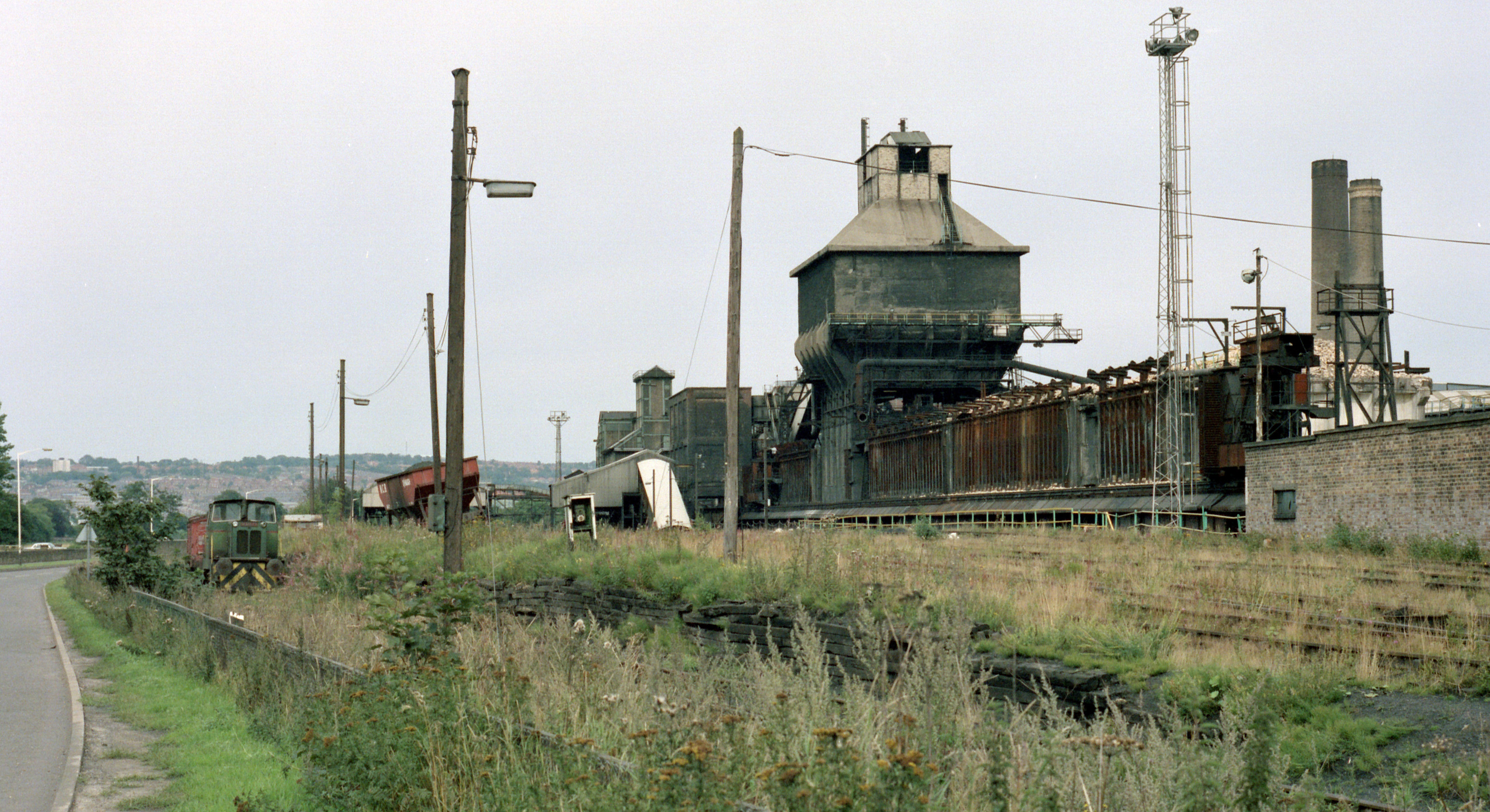
Derwenthaugh Coke Works after closure, taken on 31 August 1986.

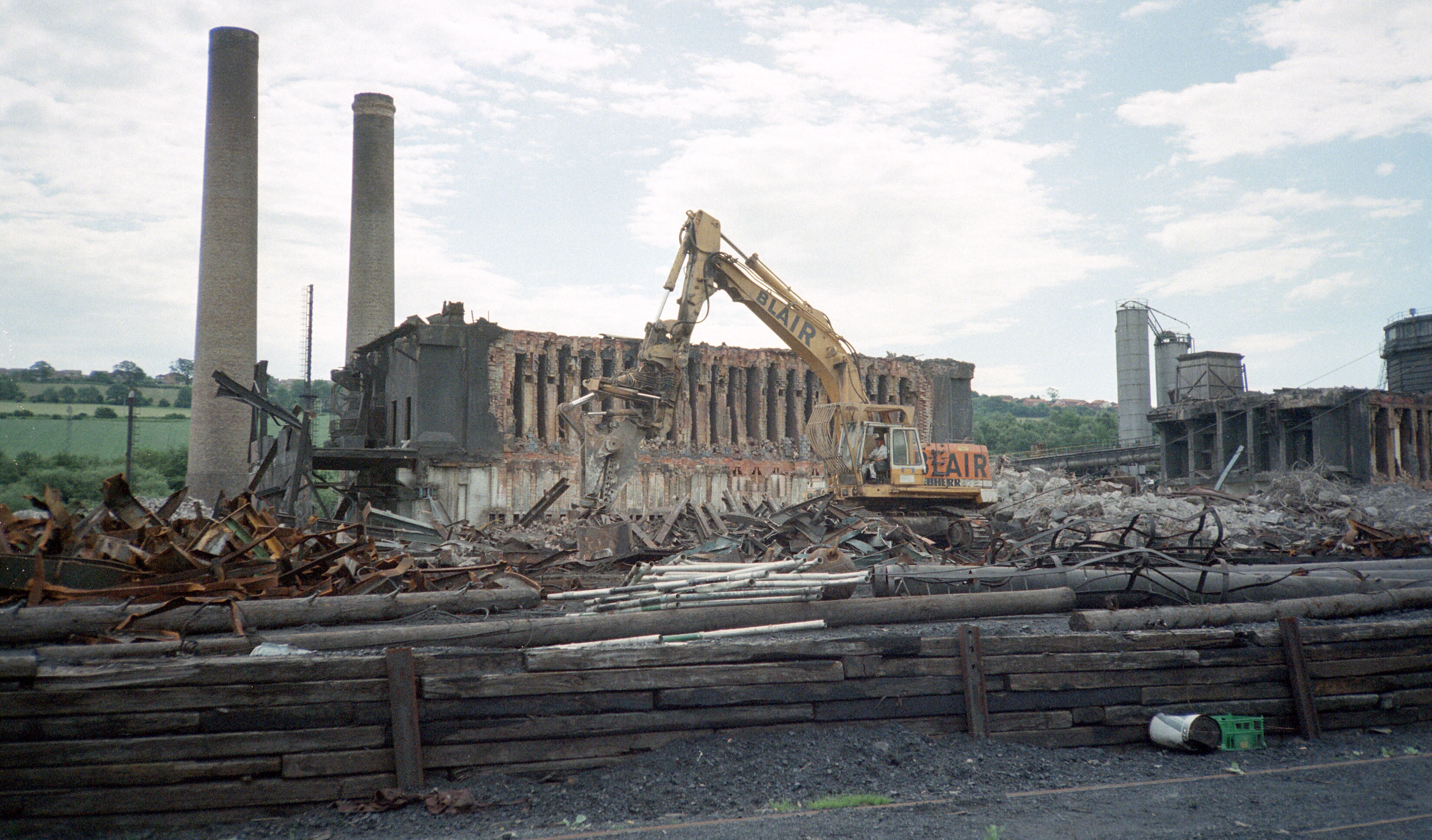
Derwenthaugh Coke Works being demolished, taken on 4/7/87.

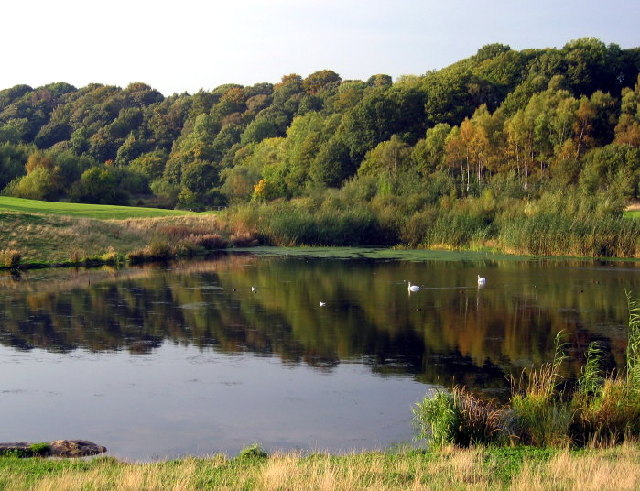
Derwenthaugh Park now sits on the site of the coke works

Derwenthaugh Staith with storage tanks, around 1987

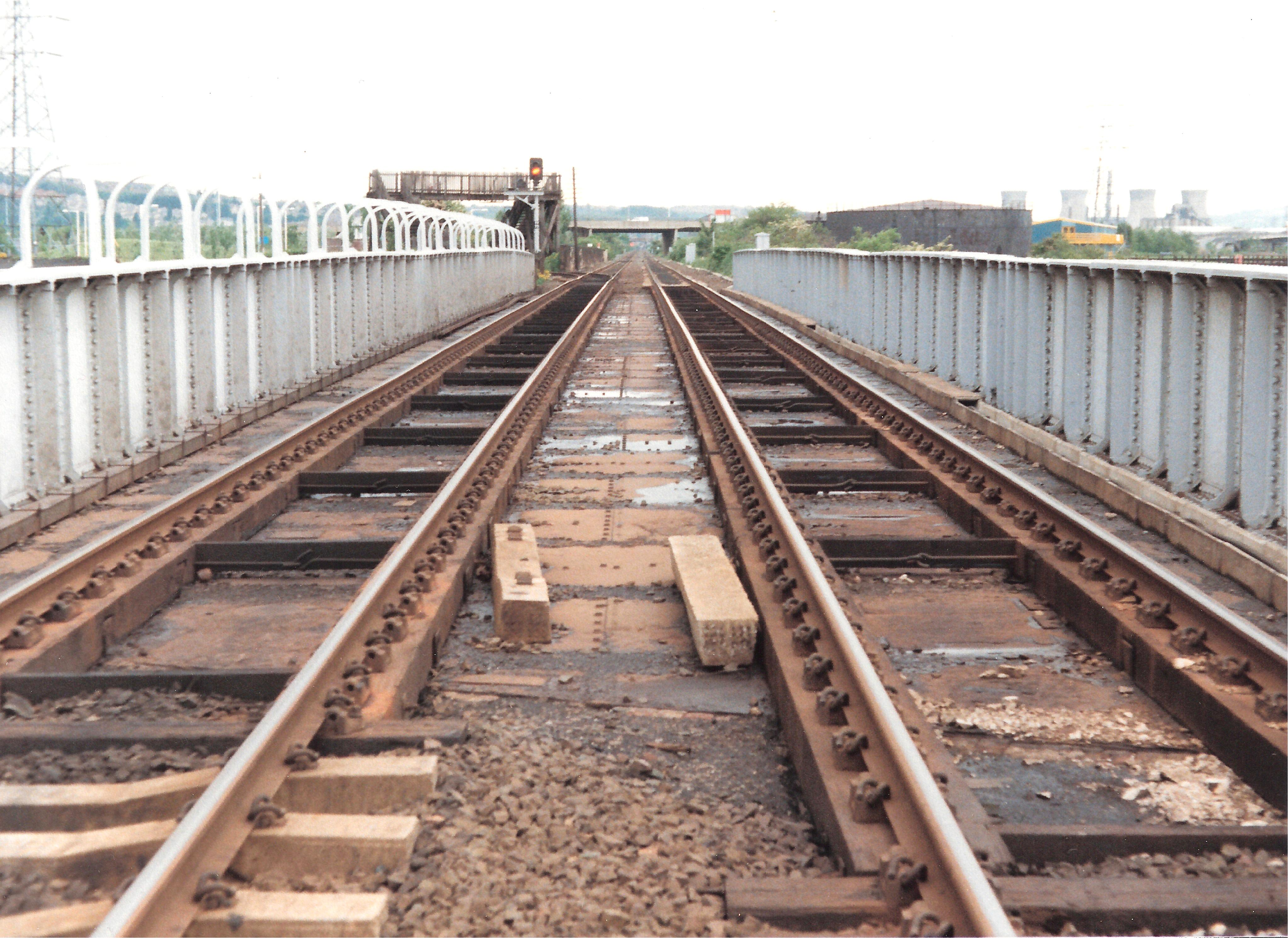
Newcastle to Carlisle railway with line to Winlaton Mill branching off to left. Taken around 1987.

== Remains ==
Very little evidence of the plant remains, however, the large stone wall separating the railway line (now a public bridleway) from the A694 where it ran along a narrow ledge between the river and the road is still in situ, as is the bridge on the A1 Western By-pass, under which the line ran to the BR exchange sidings and the staithe. The staithe closed in 1960 but is still in existence, albeit minus its machinery. Some of the rolling stock has survived, with at least one hopper wagon marked NCB D/HAUGH residing on the Tanfield Railway, along with a Consett Iron Co. van which for many years served as part of Derwenthaugh MPD's breakdown train and a tar wagon originating from Bankfoot Coke Works (near Crook) which had found its way to Derwenthaugh by the time the works closed. The Kitson pannier tank was also rescued from the cutter's torch in 1972, and in 1986 was restored to its original identity as Consett Iron Co. "A" class No.5, and repainted in the Indian red livery it carried when new. It now operates over part of the line from Backworth Colliery to the Tyne at the Stephenson Railway Museum in North Shields and was reunited with the other surviving stock when it visited the Tanfield Railway in 2015. Not so lucky was No. 42, which was identical to No. 41, built to works No. 2510. This met the fate of most other British steam locomotives, and was cut up on-site in 1968. The railway line was originally constructed as the Garesfield & Chopwell Railway to serve collieries further up the valley, but terminated at Winlaton Mill by the time the works closed. The embankment on which the part of the line west of the works ran can be glimpsed from the road towards Rowlands Gill. The stone abutments of a bridge on this line can also be seen to the rear of the Golden Lion pub, and the style of construction (yellow pit-bricks and tall arched windows) of the house immediately adjacent to this pub suggests that it was part of the mine complex, but it was in fact a Primitive Methodist Chapel, built circa 1869. After Derwenthaugh closed, Monkton near Hebburn was the only remaining coke works in the area, Lambton, Norwood and Hawthorn all having closed a couple of years previously (the latter was the newest works, opened to process coal from the massive Hawthorn Combined Mine in 1961, but was mothballed during the 1984–85 miners' strike and never re-opened). The site of Norwood Coke Works became part of the 1990 Gateshead National Garden Festival and is now home to the Festival Park housing estate. 1990 also saw the closure of Monkton, marking the end of coke production in the area. As of 2012, the only remaining operational coke ovens in the north east of England are those on Teesside which supply coke for the blast furnace at Redcar.
