= Category D =

Category D can refer to:

- Category D pregnancy - Positive evidence of risk
- Category D Prison
- Category D, for an International Driving Permit
- Category D villages – mining villages in County Durham (such as High Spen) condemned under the 1951 County Development Plan.
- Category D stations (DfT)
