= Edward Prest (priest) =

English Anglican priest (1824–1882)

Edward Prest (1824–1882) was an English churchman, Archdeacon of Durham from 1863 until 1882.

== Life ==
He was born on 18 October 1824 in St Crux parish, the son of John Prest, a merchant of the Pavement, York, and his wife Arabella Lambert; he was one of five sons, with William Prest (1832–1885) being a younger brother. He was educated at Uppingham School and matriculated in 1843 at St John's College, Cambridge, graduating B.A. in 1847 and M.A. 1850.

Prest was ordained deacon in 1846, and priest in 1847. He was chaplain of Sherburn Hospital 1851–7, and its Master 1857–1861; after which he was Rector at Gateshead (1861–1881), also being Master of King James' Hospital there.

At the end of his life Prest was Rector of Ryton-on-Tyne (1881–1882). He died on 27 October 1882.

== Family ==
Prest married in 1852 Rose Farrar, third daughter of Henry Farrar of Princes Risborough. Of their children:

- Edward Henry Prest (1856–1893), eldest son, became headmaster of Barnard Castle School.
- Stanley Faber Prest (1858–1931), second son, an engineer, was a director of C. A. Parsons and Company.
