= Angus Watson (businessman) =

British businessman and philanthropist

Sir Angus Watson
- Sir Angus Watson, aged 80
- Born: 16 January 1874; Ryton-on-Tyne, Northumberland, United Kingdom
- Died: 31 January 1961 (aged 87); Jesmond, Newcastle
- Occupation: Businessman
- Known for: Skippers Sardines
- Spouse: Ethel
- Children: 4

Sir James Angus Watson (1874–1961) was a British businessman, grocer, and philanthropist based in Newcastle upon Tyne. He launched and owned the company Angus Watson & Co Ltd, which sold the Skippers Sardines brand, and co-owned The Spectator magazine. Watson was knighted both in Norway and Great Britain.

== Early life ==
Watson was born 16 January 1874, in Ryton-on-Tyne. Educated in the local school system, his career began aged 15 working as a clerk in a grocery firm.

== Career ==
Following a period working as a commercial traveller, where he made his first contact with the Stavanger canner industry, he then worked for Lever Brothers until 1903. In 1904, with Henry Bell Saint, Watson started the firm of Angus Watson & Co. Ltd. Sourcing Brisling from Norwegian fisherman and canneries, the company marketed the product as Skippers Sardines.

Watson employed innovative techniques to market the product and achieve brand loyalty, including employing bearded and pipe-smoking fisherman William Duncan Anderson as the face of Skippers. Starting the company with three employees, over 7 years this rose to c. 1,000, and he went on to have significant influence in the Norwegian canning industry.

The success of the Skippers Sardines brand led to legal challenge from the French canning industry in 1910. The dispute focused on the use of the word "sardine" in the branding, with the French claim that only pilchards could be sardines. Watson ultimately lost the case, following an appeal to the House of Lords. Although resulting in significant costs for his company, he adapted his marketing to rebrand purely as Skippers, accompanied by an advertising strategy with slogans such as "The word sardines guarantees nothing; the name “Skipper” everything" that aimed to appeal to patriotic brits to move away from sardines.

In 1921, Watson commissioned the architect Robert Mauchlen to build Whitton Grange and Whitton Cottage, in a hamlet near to the Northumberland town of Rothbury. Built in the Arts and Craft style, the house was described by Nikolaus Pevsner as "the best building of its date in the county" and was awarded Grade II status in 1987.

During World War I, Watson and his firm supported the British government in food supplies. In 1918, financial issues caused Watson to approach his previous employer, Lord Leverhulme, for aid. By 1923 Leverhulme had control of company. Leverhulme died in 1925, and by 1930 Watson had become disillusioned with the direction of the business such that he then retired. He went on to have a controlling interest, with Sir Evelyn Wrench, in The Spectator magazine, and from 1935 to 1936 he was chairman of the Congregational Union of England and Wales. He was also deputy mayor of Newcastle-upon-Tyne for a period. During the second world war he worked with the Ministry of Food. Watson died at home in Newcastle on 31 January 1961.

== Recognition ==
Watson was awarded Knight of the Order of St. Olav by Norway, and was knighted by George VI in the 1945 New Year Honours.

From 2015 to 2019, the Norwegian Canning Museum held an exhibition about Watson and his impact on the Norwegian fish canning industry.

== Personal life ==
Watson was married to Ethel. They had four children together, two sons and two daughters. He was the grandfather of literary agent Graham Watson, who died in 2002.

== Bibliography ==
- Watson, Angus (1937). My life : an autobiography. London: I. Nicholson & Watson.
- Watson, Angus (1955). The Angus clan (years 1588 to 1950). Gateshead on Tyne: Northumberland Press Limited.
