= Ian Wishart (cricketer) =

English cricketer

Personal information
- Full name: Ian Alexander Wishart
- Born: 25 December 1948 (age 77); Greenside, County Durham, England
- Batting: Right-handed
- Bowling: Right-arm medium-fast

Domestic team information
- Years: Team
- 1979: Minor Counties North
- 1971–1980: Cumberland

Career statistics
Competition	List A
Matches	1
Runs scored	0
Batting average	0.00
100s/50s	–/–
Top score	0
Balls bowled	42
Wickets	–
Bowling average	–
5 wickets in innings	–
10 wickets in match	–
Best bowling	–
Catches/stumpings	–/–
- Source: Cricinfo, 24 May 2012

Ian Alexander Wishart (born 25 December 1948) is an English former cricketer. Wishart was a right-handed batsman who bowled right-arm medium-fast. He was born at Greenside, County Durham.

Wishart made his debut for Durham against Cumberland in the 1971 Minor Counties Championship. He played minor counties cricket for Durham from 1971 to 1980, making a total of nineteen appearances for the county, the last of which came against Shropshire. In 1979, he made a single List A appearance for Minor Counties North against Kent at Lindum Sports Club Ground, Lincoln, in the 1979 Benson & Hedges Cup, He was dismissed for a duck in the match by Derek Underwood, while with the ball he bowled seven wicketless overs, with Kent winning by 9 wickets.
