= Jimmy Armstrong (footballer, born 1901) =

English footballer

Personal information
- Full name: James William Armstrong
- Date of birth: 6 September 1901
- Place of birth: Swalwell, County Durham, England
- Date of death: 1977 (aged 75–76)
- Position: Forward

Senior career*
Years	Team	Apps	(Gls)
- Spen Black and White
1922–1925	Chelsea	29	(9)
1927–1929	Tottenham Hotspur	28	(5)
1930	Luton Town	10	(0)
1930–?	Bristol Rovers	9	(2)
- * Club domestic league appearances and goals

James William Armstrong (6 September 1901 – 1977) was a professional footballer who played for Spen Black and White, Swalwell-on-Tyne, Chelsea, Tottenham Hotspur, Luton Town and Bristol Rovers.

== Football career ==
Armstrong joined Chelsea from Spen Black and White in 1922. The forward played 32 games and scored on 10 occasions for the Stamford Bridge club. He joined Tottenham Hotspur in 1927 where he featured in a further 33 games and finding the net five times in all competitions. In 1930 he moved to Luton Town to compete in 10 matches. He finished his career at Bristol Rovers and played in nine matches and netting twice.
