= Clara Vale =

Village in Tyne and Wear, England

Coordinates: 54.978°N 1.792°W

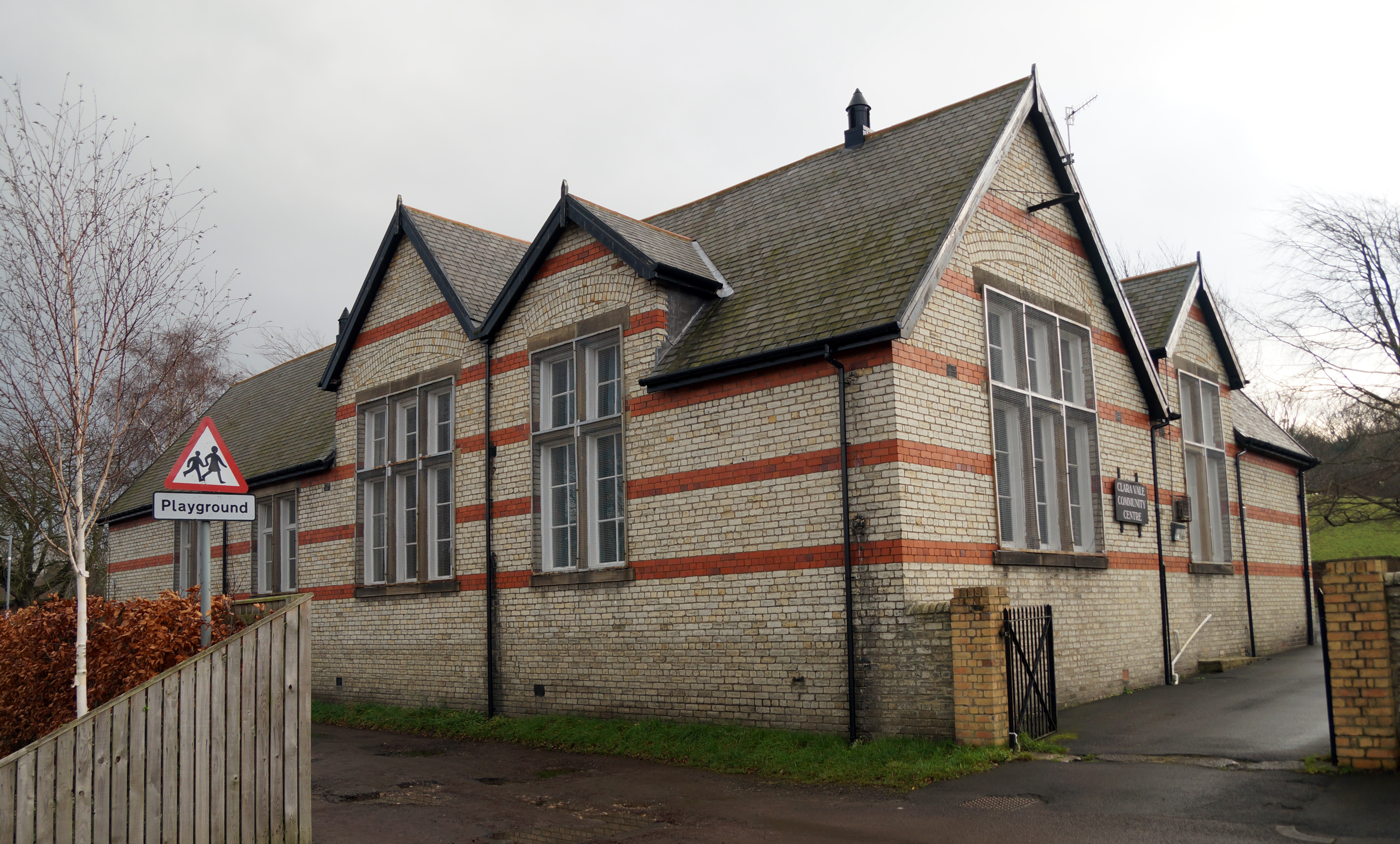
- The old school, now a community centre

- Location within Tyne and Wear
- Population: 313 (2011 census)
- OS grid reference: NZ133649
- Metropolitan borough: Gateshead
- Metropolitan county: Tyne and Wear
- Region: North East
- Country: England
- Sovereign state: United Kingdom
- Post town: RYTON
- Postcode district: NE40
- Dialling code: 0191
- Police: Northumbria
- Fire: Tyne and Wear
- Ambulance: North East
- UK Parliament: Blaydon

Clara Vale is a village situated on the south bank of the River Tyne in Tyne and Wear, England. Once an independent village in County Durham it became incorporated into the new metropolitan county of Tyne and Wear in 1974 as part of the Metropolitan Borough of Gateshead.

== Location ==
Clara Vale stands on the south bank of the River Tyne in a low-lying and quite secluded spot. Crawcrook borders the hamlet to the south. Across the river (in Northumberland) are Close House to the north and the village of Wylam to the west. It is notable for being the first settlement in Tyne and Wear that the river Tyne passes after leaving Northumberland.

== Politics ==
In local government, Clara Vale is located in the 'Crawcrook, Greenside ward' of Gateshead Council. The ward is at the far west of Gateshead and borders part of Northumberland. The ward is served by three councillors (three Labour). Gateshead Council is Labour controlled.

Clara Vale is located within the parliamentary constituency of Blaydon. Its current MP is Labour's Liz Twist.

== History ==
Before the colliery and village were developed, a water-driven corn mill called Crawcrook Mill stood near the centre of the current village, with two small stone cottages and a mill dam apparently fed from Edington Well. This 'pot-pie' well is damaged but still stands near the road to the south of the village.

Stannerford Road is the only vehicular route into Clara Vale, named after a former ford across the River Tyne which it led to, linking Crawcrook to the south and Heddon-on-the-Wall to the north.

Maps from 1850 show a farmhouse called Stanner (or Stannar) House, which was later divided into two dwellings and demolished in the mid-1960s.

Clara Vale was purpose built as a colliery community by the Stella Coal Company around the time the coal mine was opened in July 1893. The colliery and settlement were named after the wife of colliery owner John Bell Simpson, Clara was Atkinson (née Draper). There are early references to Claraville and some old maps refer to the village as Claravale.

An Anglican 'tin tabernacle', the Church of the Good Shepherd stood in the centre of the village from 1886 to 1979. Two successive miners' institutes were on adjacent land, the last being demolished in the early 1990s. The village school educated children from ages 5 to 14 between 1898 and 1962. A community association took over the running of the building in 1967, establishing it as a volunteer-run community centre and village hall.

A peak of 1221 employees were recorded at the colliery in 1925, declining to 562 in 1965, shortly before closure in February 1966 (around the same time as many other nearby pits such as Emma, Greenside and Stargate).

Like many former pit communities, Clara Vale was then given 'Category D' status by Durham County Council, meaning capital investment was discouraged and the settlement was expected to decline over time.

Many derelict colliery buildings remained until demolition in the 1980s, though the original ambulance shed remains. The former pithead baths building was repurposed for use by a succession of light industrial companies, and was a sound recording studio for some years. It was damaged and ultimately destroyed by fires in the 2010s.

== Modern-day Clara Vale ==
By avoiding the suburbanisation experienced by nearby towns and villages such as Crawcrook, Greenside and Ryton, Clara Vale has largely retained its rural character, with farmland and countryside surrounding the village. This includes a Local Nature Reserve on the site of the old colliery, actively managed by the volunteers of Clara Vale Conservation Group to promote biodiversity.

Clara Vale has very little in the way of modern development. A bungalow was built on the site of the former village shop in 1984 and in 1997 a short terraced street was built, more in the traditional style of the village. The former Co-Op building (dating from around 1900) stood empty for decades but was converted to flats in the mid-2010s. Also around that time, the Methodist chapel was converted to a private residence and the adjacent Sunday school was converted to an Airbnb holiday rental.

The village hall benefited from some refurbishment in the early 21st century and offers a range of activities and amenities including room hire for sports and events, various groups and classes, community meals and occasional music and theatre events. In the 2010s, part of the village hall was converted to small office units which are leased out, providing regular income to maintain the whole building.

Clara Vale has no shops, having over recent years been served by a mobile greengrocer, butcher, fishmonger and wholefoods supplier. Nearby Crawcrook, Ryton and Wylam offer a range of shops and services within walking distance; so whilst Clara Vale remains secluded, it is by no means isolated.

== Sport ==
The village recreation ground was originally provided by the pit owners for the miners' welfare, originally including a bowling green and tennis courts. These became derelict and were subsumed by the local nature reserve, but the football pitch, cricket pitch and pavilion remain in active use. Clara Vale Cricket Club play matches there on Saturdays during the Summer, with Ovingham Bridge End Cricket Club playing on some Sundays and Merz and McLellan Cricket Club on some Wednesday evenings. Ryton and Crawcrook Albion (Youth) Football Club also use the football pitch.

Ryton Golf Club, to the north edge of the village, was established in 1891 (on riverside land known as Doctors Stanners), expanding in 1982 to use the former sites of allotment gardens and colliery railway works. Tyneside Golf Club is based in Ryton but its course borders Clara Vale's eastern edge. Close House golf club is to the north, over the river.

== See also ==
- The Vale of Clara, a national nature reserve located in County Wicklow, Ireland.
