= Ambrose Crowley =

English ironmonger and politician (1657 - 1713)

Sir Ambrose Crowley III (1 April 1657/8 – 17 October 1713) was a 17th-century English ironmonger and politician who was returned to the House of Commons in 1713.

== Early years ==
Crowley was the son of Ambrose Crowley II, a Quaker blacksmith in Stourbridge, and Mary Hall and rose Dick Whittington-style to become Sheriff of London for 1706.

He was knighted on 1 January 1706 by Queen Anne.

== Career ==
The Crowley Iron Works at Winlaton, Winlaton Mill and Swalwell, all in County Durham were probably at the time Europe's biggest industrial location. Later, as he was owed so much money by the British Government Ambrose became a director of the South Sea Company on its formation. Today he is still known for his enlightened management methods. His workers had an elected works committee, sickness payments, company medical team and were treated with respect. These rules were set out in the 'Rules of the Crowley Iron'. The main works at Winlaton Mill used mainly imported iron. Both iron and steel were worked by the Heyford process. Technologies and skills developed at Winlaton Mill lead to the foundation of the Sheffield steel industry and the ability to machine steel. British iron production was focused at Ynyscedwyn in South Wales and in the Wealden area of Southern England. The business survived into the Victorian era and the 'Crowley Crew' were renowned for their skills with metal and their steadfast and resolute defence of their rights and freedoms in the face of government intimidation.

Crowley retained connections with his birthplace as writing Newcastle, August 8, 1702 he requested Navy Board Protections for Robert Capper of Staffordshire and four of his men who he'd employed to repair his works as he couldn't find anyone local, following their concerns about impressment

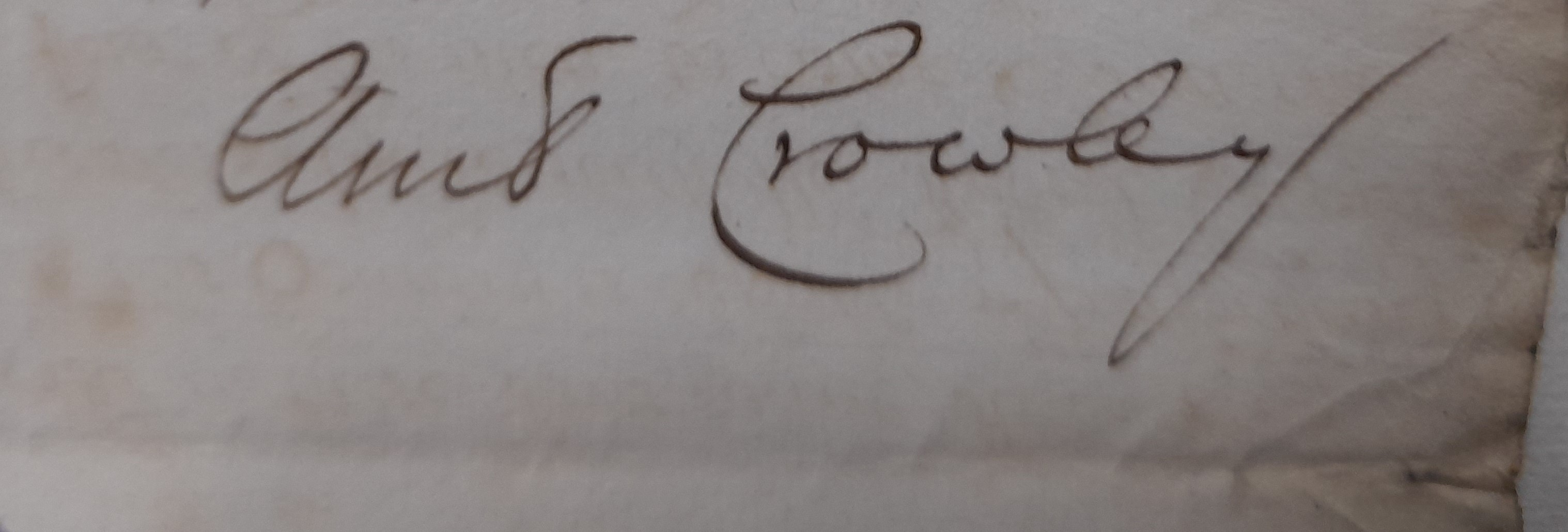
Ambrose Crowley's signature

In August 1713 he was elected Member of Parliament for Andover but died on 17 October.

== Family ==
Ambrose married Mary Owen, daughter of Charles Owen. Many of their children died young. His wife's memorial lists seven children who died as infants. The children that lived to adulthood were as follows:

- John Crowley who married Theodosia Gascoigne
- Mary who married Sir James Hallett
- Lettice married Sir John Hynde Cotton, 3rd Baronet
- Sarah married Humphry Parsons
- Anna married Richard Fleming
- Elizabeth married Lord St John of Bletsoe.

His direct descendants include:

- British comedian and actor Alexander Armstrong.
- Hugh Magnus MacLeod of MacLeod, 30th Chief of Clan MacLeod.
- Anthony Tudor St John, 22nd Baron St John of Bletso.

== Burial ==
Sir Ambrose was buried at SS Peter and Paul's Church at Mitcham in Surrey where there is a monument with the following inscription:

NEAR THIS PLACE ARE DEPOSITED THE REMAINS OF SIR AMBROSE CROWLEY KNIGHT, CITIZEN AND ALDERMAN OF LONDON, WHOSE NUMEROUS FAMILY AND GREAT ESTATE WERE THE PRESENT REWARDS OF AN IDEFATIGABLE INDUSTRY AND APPLICATION TO BUSINESS, AN UNBLEMISHED PROBITY, AND A SINCERE BELIEF AND PRACTICE OF TRUE CHRISTIANITY, AND PARTICULARLY A BOUNDLESS LIBERALITY TOWARDS THE POOR, MANY HUNDREDS OF WHOM HE CONTINUALLY EMPLOYED.
