= Holy Cross Church, Ryton =

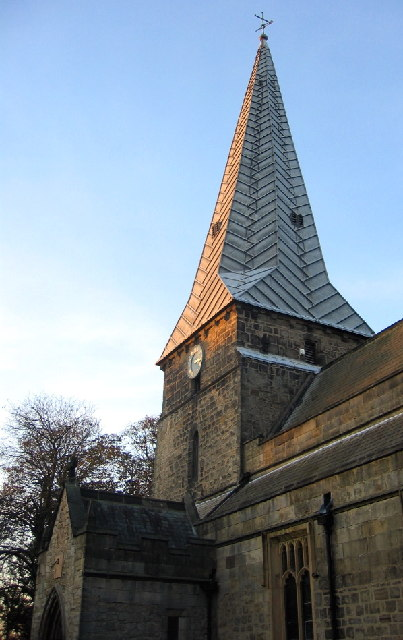
- Holy Cross Church, Ryton
- 54.977861°N 1.765615°W
- OS grid reference: NZ 15100 64831
- Location: Ryton, Tyne and Wear, NE40 3QP
- Country: England
- Denomination: Church of England
- Website: holycrossryton.org.uk

Administration
- Diocese: Diocese of Durham
- Archdeaconry: Archdeaconry of Sunderland
- Deanery: West Gateshead
- Parish: Ryton

Clergy
- Rector: The Revd Tom Jamieson

Holy Cross Church is a Church of England parish church in Ryton, Tyne and Wear. The church is a Grade I listed building.

== History ==
The Holy Cross church is the oldest building in Ryton and dates back to 1220. The most striking feature of the church is its 13th-century broach spire which is 36 m tall. Other well known artefacts include a 13th-century Frosterley Marble effigy of a deacon holding a book.

== Notable clergy ==
There have been a number of prominent rectors of Ryton. These include: Thomas Secker (1727), later the Archbishop of Canterbury; Charles Thorp (1807) virtual founder and first warden of the University of Durham; and The Hon. Richard Byron (1769), brother of William Byron, 5th Baron Byron and great-uncle of Lord Byron.
