= Venture Transport =

British bus operating company

- Ceased operation: 1 May 1970
- Service area: North East England
- Fleet: 86 (May 1970)

Venture Transport was the largest independent bus operator in North East England. It operated services in the Derwent Valley between Consett and Newcastle upon Tyne.

It was formed by the amalgamation of Venture Bus Services Ltd. and Reed Bros. Ltd. in 1938. Both were old-established companies which had operated in the Derwent Valley since the close of the 1914-18 war; Reed Bros. had also operated in a small way between 1912 and 1914. On 1 May 1970, it was sold to the Northern General Transport Company with 86 buses.

== Resurrection of the Venture name ==
Shortly after deregulation, Go-Ahead Northern brought back the Venture name for services from the former Venture depot in High Spen. More recently Go North East has reintroduced the name to promote services in the Consett area.
