= Crawcrook =

Village in Tyne and Wear, England

Coordinates: 54.9663°N 1.7898°W

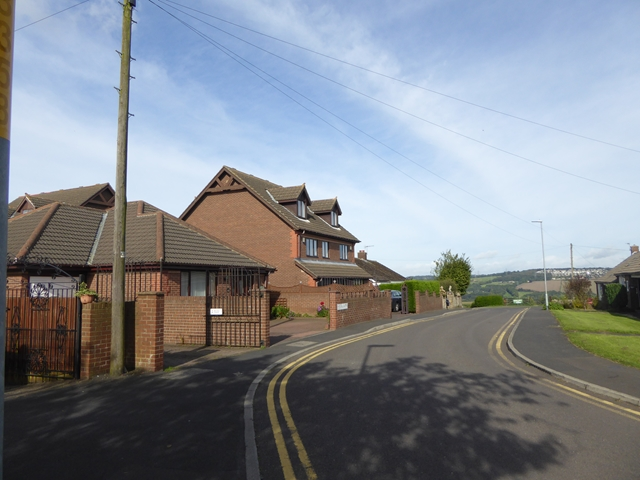

- Location within Tyne and Wear
- Population: 5,407 (2011 Census)
- OS grid reference: NZ134635
- Metropolitan borough: Gateshead
- Metropolitan county: Tyne and Wear
- Region: North East
- Country: England
- Sovereign state: United Kingdom
- Post town: RYTON
- Postcode district: NE40
- Dialling code: 0191
- Police: Northumbria
- Fire: Tyne and Wear
- Ambulance: North East
- UK Parliament: Blaydon and Consett

Crawcrook is a village in the Metropolitan Borough of Gateshead in Tyne and Wear, England. The population taken at the 2021 Census of the Gateshead ward (Crawcrook and Greenside) was 9,058, increasing from 8,841 in 2011. The village is historically part of County Durham.

== Location ==
Crawcrook lies in the Tyne Valley, midway between Prudhoe in Northumberland and Ryton, also in Tyne and Wear.

== Local politics ==
In local government, Crawcrook is located in the 'Crawcrook and Greenside ward'. The ward is at the far west of the borough and borders Northumberland. The Crawcrook and Greenside ward is served by three Labour councillors, Kathryn Henderson, Hugh Kelly & Kathleen McCartney.Councillors - Gateshead Council

Crawcrook is located within the parliamentary constituency of Blaydon and Consett. Its current MP is Labour's Liz Twist. Until the 2024 General Election, Crawcrook was within the Blaydon constituency, which was abolished by the 2023 boundary review.

Crawcrook was formerly a township in the parish of Ryton. In 1866, Crawcrook became a separate civil parish; on 1 April 1914 the parish was abolished and merged with Ryton. In 1911 the parish had a population of 3523.

== History ==
At the turn of the twentieth century, and in common with the nearby areas of Greenside, Clara Vale and Stargate, Crawcrook was a village with a vibrant coal industry. With major pits such as Emma and Clara, as well as several smaller pits, Crawcrook became a major coal mining centre. However the coal industry collapsed in the village during the 1950s and 1960s. As has happened to a number of other northern English villages employment in tertiary industries has replaced the coal industry. However, Crawcrook's coal mining heritage is still evident; a number of the old miners' homes still exist in the surrounding area, including Clifford Terrace and Morgy Hill near to Crawcrook's main street, and the Simpson Memorial Home in nearby Barmoor. Old wagonways used to transport coal are also still present, although they are now maintained as footpaths.

During the 1970s and 1980s, with the creation of the Kepier Chare and Westburn private housing estates, Crawcrook grew significantly in size and became largely suburbanised and is being used increasingly as a commuter village for the conurbation of Tyneside.

Significant expansion once again took place in the 2010s, with the construction of the Valley Rise estate in the north of the village, and the Fairfields Manor estate in the south. The latter attracted significant opposition due to its encroachment on the popular 'Hill 60' publicly accessible fields.

== Amenities and transport links ==
Unlike many villages of a similar semi-rural character, Crawcrook has maintained its broad range of amenities. Crawcrook main street has several shops including a library, a co-operative food store and two petrol stations. It also has a selection of independent shops, including a family-run freezer centre/bargain store, which in October 2015 was renovated into a One Stop Store which is still family run, a greengrocers, a butchers, Three gentlemen's barbers, two hairdressing salons, a tanning salon, a number of pubs, a chiropodist, a doctor's surgery, which was rebuilt with a new pharmacy right next door, two veterinary practices and a restaurant. There are also several churches in the village from a number of denominations including Catholic, Pentecostal, Church of England and Methodist. After the closure of Kepier Chare school, the village now has only two primary schools; St Agnes Roman Catholic school and Emmaville school. During 2007, Emmaville school was extended to allow former pupils from Kepier Chare to attend there. In 2009 St Agnes Roman Catholic School relocated to the former Kepier Chare school. There is also a separate private nursery located next to the Doctor's Surgery.

The area is also well served by public transport, with regular bus links to Hexham, the MetroCentre, Gateshead and Newcastle Upon Tyne as well as nearby towns and villages such as Ryton, Prudhoe, Chopwell, High Spen and Clara Vale.

The village sits around a mile from the railway station in Wylam, providing a rail link to Newcastle and Carlisle. Unfortunately, there is currently no regular bus service between Crawcrook & Wylam.

Crawcrook sits less than 2 miles from the Hadrian's and Keelman's ways, providing traffic free cycling and walking routes into Newcastle, Gateshead and Low Prudhoe.

Crawcrook has its own village park, located in the Garden House Estate area of the village. Created in the 1950s, it consists of toddler play equipment, a tennis court/five a side football area, and a bowling green. Community events are held at the park throughout the year.

The local football club, Ryton and Crawcrook Albion FC are based at Kingsley Park in the north of the village, and play in the Northern League, Division 2.

Other recreational facilities nearby include four golf courses, Tyneside golf club at Ryton, Ryton golf club at Clara Vale, Close House golf club in Wylam, and Prudhoe golf club in Prudhoe. Golf courses slightly further away include Whickham golf club, at Whickham, Garesfield golf club at High Spen and Stocksfield golf club in Stocksfield.

== Education ==
There are two primary schools in the village. St Agnes RC school, the school of Crawcrook's Roman Catholic parish, and Emmaville primary school. Both schools perform exceedingly well compared to other schools in the Gateshead Local Education Authority and nationally.

There was a third school, Kepier Chare school. However, in 2007 it was closed with some pupils transferred to Emmaville school or other local schools. In 2010 St Agnes RC school relocated to the former Kepier Chare site and is to date still there. The existing St Agnes school building was demolished, with a small housing development taking its place.

Secondary education for the village is provided by Thorp Academy in Ryton, and St Thomas More Catholic School in Blaydon.

== Demography ==
As of the 2021 census, 96.4% of people in the Crawcrook and Greenside ward were in the white British ethnic group, more than both the national average, and the Gateshead average of 93.5%. The ward has an ageing population according to the 2021 census, with the number of people aged 60+ increasing while the number of those aged under 60 decreased. The Ward had slightly higher employment rates than the rest of Gateshead at the 2021 census, with 61% of residents being 'economically active', defined as: "those aged 16+ who were working in the week before the Census, or were not working but had accepted a job, or were looking for work and could start within 2 weeks", compared to 58% across the whole borough. This includes 57% of residents who were in full or part-time employment, or were self employed.

== Surrounding area ==
Within less than a mile of Crawcrook's main street and its residential areas, lies farmland and rich countryside, particularly to the west and north of the village. To the west of the village these include farmland and Sled Lane, with its woodland and ponds; Bradley Gardens, a Victorian walled garden and, to the north, more farmland as well as the meadows between Crawcrook and Wylam.

Other notable features of Crawcrook's environment include its landed estates, in particular Bradley Hall, and its sand quarries, that have partly encroached on some of its countryside to the north-west of the village. Further down the Tyne valley there are picturesque villages and towns such as Prudhoe, Stocksfield and Corbridge.

There are quite a few churches in Crawcrook, one Methodist, one Anglican, and one Roman Catholic (St Agnes).
