= Ryton, Tyne and Wear =

Coordinates: 54.973°N 1.763°W

Ryton
- Village
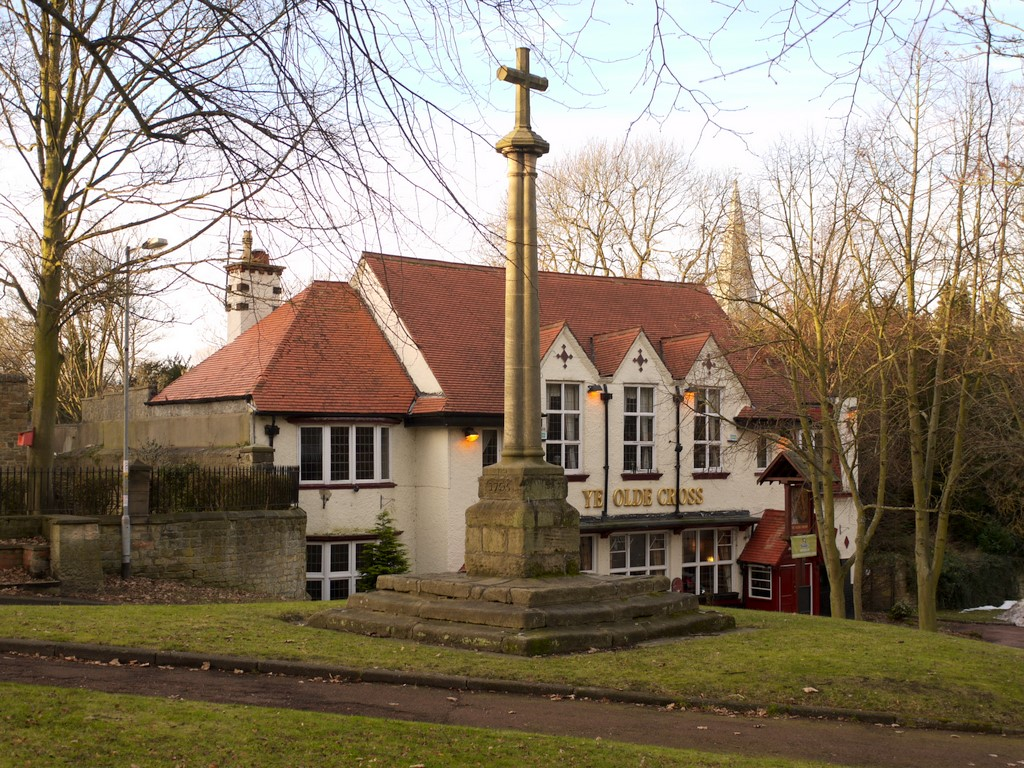
- The village green

- Location within Tyne and Wear
- Population: 7,310 (2011)
- OS grid reference: NZ1464
- Metropolitan borough: Gateshead
- Metropolitan county: Tyne and Wear
- Region: North East
- Country: England
- Sovereign state: United Kingdom
- Areas of the 2011 Tyneside sub division: List: Crawcrook; Crookhill; Greenside; Stella
- Post town: RYTON
- Postcode district: NE40
- Dialling code: 0191
- Police: Northumbria
- Fire: Tyne and Wear
- Ambulance: North East
- UK Parliament: Blaydon and Consett

Ryton is a village in Tyne and Wear, England. It is in the Metropolitan Borough of Gateshead, historically part of County Durham. In 2011, the population of the Ryton, Crookhill and Stella ward was 8,146. It is 6 miles (9.7 km) west of Newcastle upon Tyne.

== Location ==
Ryton lies midway between Crawcrook and Blaydon, both in the Metropolitan Borough of Gateshead. Nearby settlements include Stargate, Clara Vale, Greenside, Stella and Hedgefield. Stargate is on the outskirts of Ryton, towards Blaydon. It has a children's park, a fish shop, a quarry and allotments. In the neighbouring town of Crookhill there is a primary school and a general store, which can also be used as a post office. Ryton is located within Gateshead's Green Belt which mainly contains areas west and southwest of Gateshead Town because the area of South Tyneside to the east is largely urbanised.

== History ==
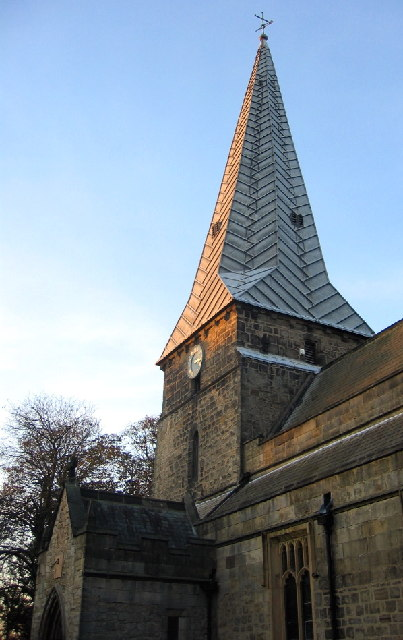
The Holy Cross Church

Traditionally, Ryton's economy was built upon agriculture and coal mining. Some think that coal mining was taking place in the area as early as Roman times, however it was not until 1239 when Henry III granted that coal could be mined outside the walls that mining became extensive. There are records of coal being shipped from Winlaton to London as early as 1367. The agricultural industry in Ryton was mixed and included both pastoral farming and arable farming.

Ryton's position south of the Scottish Borders and Hadrian's Wall made it a target for Scottish attacks in the area, and it was burned by William Wallace in 1297. A further attack by David II of Scotland was recorded in 1346, during which the church was plundered.

As well as its coal industry, Ryton formerly contained the lead-smelting reverberatory furnaces of the Ryton Company, whose mines were on Alston Moor. By 1704, this business had been amalgamated into the London Lead Company.

In 1800 the Stargate Pit (Towneley Main Colliery) was opened and on 30 May 1826, a coal dust and methane (firedamp) explosion there killed 20 men and 18 boys. This became known as the "Stargate Pit Disaster". There is a memorial marker at Ryton's Holy Cross Church, and another memorial stone at the pit itself. The Stargate Pit was reopened in 1840 and not closed until 1961.

Ryton soon became a place of migration for the wealthy, who wanted to escape the urban sprawl of the Industrial Revolution in Gateshead and Newcastle-Upon-Tyne. A reminder of Ryton's affluent past is found in some of the large mansions at Old Ryton Village, a place rich in rural qualities because of its proximity to Ryton Willows on the banks of the River Tyne. The most notable mansion in the village is The Grove, formerly known as Ryton Grove, a 12,000 sq ft brick building in the symmetrical Queen Anne style, believed to have been constructed for the Surtees family in 1742, and later substantially extended and remodelled in 1919. This was originally at the centre of a 350-acre estate that encompassed many houses within Ryton Village and much of Ryton Willows down to the banks of the river Tyne, including a large lake that was later divided in to two by a railway embankment. A large part of the estate became a nature reserve in 1964, with The Grove remaining in private ownership standing in 7 acres. After the decline of the coal industry during the second half of the twentieth century, Ryton became increasingly suburbanised and is now effectively a suburb of Gateshead.

== Local politics ==
In local government, Ryton is in the Ryton, Crookhill and Stella ward, which is in the outer west of the borough. The ward is served by three councillors, who represent Labour. Gateshead Council is Labour controlled.

Ryton is located within the parliamentary constituency of Blaydon and Consett. Its current MP is Labour's Liz Twist.

== Geography ==
The neighbouring village of Crawcrook is a nexus of coal mining nostalgia also. Remnants of several old pits across Ryton and Crawcrook, including Emma, Clara and Addison can still be found. Within a couple of hundred metres of both Crawcrook and Ryton main street there is rich countryside.

Perhaps the most impressive section of this countryside is Ryton Willows Local Nature Reserve located on the banks of the Tyne, just past Old Ryton Village. It consists of 43 hectares of grassland, ponds, woodland and locally rare species of flora and fauna. Because of this it has been designated as a site of special scientific interest. All land within Ryton Willows SSSI is owned by the local authority.

Other areas of countryside include nearby Stargate pond and Addison and Hedgefield Woods. Alexander Graham Bell made one of his pioneering telephone calls at Addison woods.

Further up the Tyne Valley, past the village of Crawcrook and into the border of Northumberland, there are rural market towns such as Prudhoe, Corbridge and Hexham.

== Ryton today ==
Ryton is a largely residential area with a variety of local amenities. In the more central part of Ryton these include a Cooperative supermarket and a small selection of independent businesses and shops, a dentist and various hair and beauty salons. Ryton has several restaurants and public houses, one of which is located in Ryton Old Village, the community-owned Ye Olde Cross.

Ryton has a large Edwardian park, Ferndene Park, which includes children's playing equipment, Tennis Court and a bowling green.

Ryton is home to three schools, Ryton Infants School, Ryton Junior School and Thorp Academy, all of which occupy the same site in the village. Nearby Crawcrook offers two more primary schools. Crookhill Primary is nearby.

Sport plays a role in the local community. Apart from the two local golf courses and Ferndene park's facilities, Ryton has a football club, Ryton & Crawcrook Albion F.C., who play at Kingsley Park in Crawcrook, a rugby union team, Ryton Rugby Football Club at nearby Barmoor, and a cricket club, situated opposite Thorp Academy.

Ryton's public transport is limited to bus services. The R3/R4 links locally to Winlaton, Blaydon and Rowlands Gill via Stargate, while the 10, 10A and 10B service route runs to Crawcrook, Greenside, Prudhoe and Hexham to the west and the MetroCentre and Newcastle to the east. Despite being in the Metropolitan borough of Gateshead, no direct services run there.

== Other features of Ryton ==
Both John Wesley and Charles Wesley preached at Ryton's village green, which has a rich history with religious and social significance. Like many greens in similar villages, it played host to an annual fair which included jugglers, dancers and local stalls.

The old pinfold dates back to the twelfth century. During the second half of the twentieth century the pinfold was restored.

Charles Thorp set up a savings bank in 1815 in a building within the old village known as the White House which still stands there today. It is thought to have been the first bank of its kind in England.

The annual Ryton Music Festival, held over February and March, has been held in the village for more than 79 years. It offers a variety of music and drama including choral singing and mime.

The Ryton Summer Festival, held at the local comprehensive school usually includes live music, sport and arts and crafts stalls.

Each year on the Tuesday before Christmas Eve villagers gather on the village green to sing traditional carols accompanied by a local brass band.

There are two air raid shelters in Ryton Willows, as well as other Second World War features such trenches and shower/toilet rooms with tiles, etc. still visible, next to a railway line that was apparently used to bring children up from London. A dirt road hidden under trees leading up to the bottom of the village may have been a checkpoint.

== Notable residents ==
- George Hepplewhite, furniture designer
- Howard Kendall, footballer
- Mark Outterside, professional football player for Sunderland AFC who made over 39 English Football League appearances
- Charles Algernon Parsons, engineer and inventor of the steam turbine
- Stan Ramsay, footballer
- Thomas Secker, Archbishop of Canterbury 1758–68, one-time Rector of Holy Cross Church, Ryton
- Charles Thorp, founder of Durham University
- Robert Thorp, clergyman
- Liz Twist (born 1956), Labour MP Blaydon and Consett
- Rachel and Becky Unthank, folk singers, grew up in Ryton
- Sir Angus Watson (1874–1961), businessman, grocer, and philanthropist
- Nicholas Wood, civil and mining engineer
- Daniel Daglish (born 2001), philanthropist and TV personality
- Conan Swinney (born 2004), swimmer

== Sources ==
- Grundy, John (2022). History of Northumberland. Newcastle upon Tyne: Tyne Bridge Publishing. ISBN 9781838280970.
