= St Paul's Church, Winlaton =

St Paul
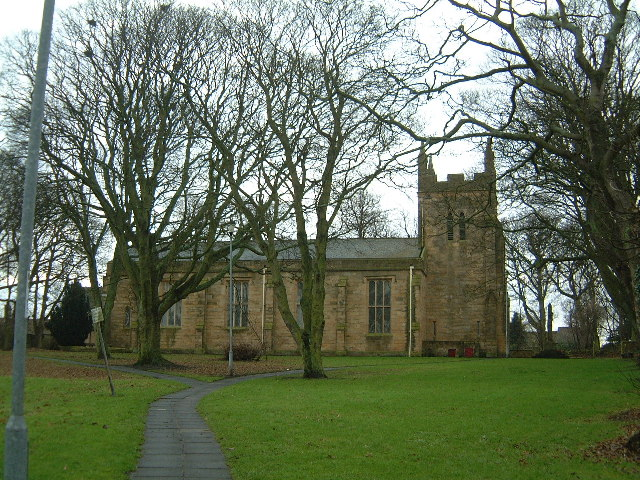

- St Paul shown within Tyne and Wear
- 54.9516°N 1.7278°W osgraw = NZ175619
- Location: Winlaton
- Country: England
- Denomination: Anglican

History
- Status: Parish church

Architecture
- Functional status: Active

St Paul's Church is a 19th-century church in Winlaton, Tyne and Wear, England, dedicated to St Paul. It is a Grade II listed building.

== History ==
The church was designed by Ignatius Bonomi and consecrated in 1828.

In the 20th century alterations and maintenance work to the church were carried out by Charlewood, Curry, Wilson & Atkinson, architects.

Inside the church there is a memorial plaque dedicated to former pupils of Blaydon Secondary School who died in World War I. The plaque was transferred to the church when the school closed in 1998.
