= Hookergate School =

Location
- School Lane; High Spen; Tyne and Wear; England; 54.9277°N 1.7742°W

Information
- Type: Community school
- Closed: 2011
- Local authority: Gateshead
- Department for Education URN: 108408 Tables
- Gender: Coeducational
- Age: 11 to 18
- Capacity: 888

Hookergate School was a secondary school and sixth form located in High Spen in the Metropolitan Borough of Gateshead, England.

Originally founded as Hookergate Grammar School, the secondary school was formally merged with Ryton Comprehensive School in 2011, and was renamed Charles Thorp Comprehensive School (now Thorp Academy). The new school operated over both of the former school sites until 2012 when the school relocated completely to the former Ryton school campus. The school campus went up for sale, with offers closing on 18 November 2015, to be sold as a 'development opportunity'.

The site upon where the school was located had been then used for filming of BBC Children's Productions shows such as Wolfblood and a spin-off of Tracy Beaker Returns, The Dumping Ground.
