= Addison and Hedgefield Woods =

Nature reserve in England

- Interactive map of Addison and Hedgefield Woods
- Location: Blaydon, Tyne and Wear, England
- Coordinates: 54°58′21″N 01°44′24″W
- Area: 14 ha (35 acres)
- Established: 2014
- Governing body: Durham Wildlife Trust

Addison and Hedgefield Woods is a 14-hectare nature reserve situated in Blaydon, Tyne and Wear, England. The reserve encompasses diverse habitats such as woodland, scrub, and grasslands. Noted for its rich array of wildflower species, it serves as a habitat for various bird species.

Addison and Hedgefield Woods has been under the management of the Durham Wildlife Trust since 2014.

== History ==
Previously a thriving colliery and village, the site was home to the Addison Colliery, established in 1864 and owned by the Stella Coal Company. The colliery was notable for its depth, at sixty-four fathoms, and employed advanced pumping and ventilation technology.

Strategically located along the railway line, the colliery transported coal via its private three-mile-long railway, and it housed numerous coke ovens. The colliery's namesake was Mr. Addison Potter, with a ceremony celebrating the "first sod" cut by Mrs. Addison Potter on 26 January 1864.

Addison Colliery gained prominence as the first colliery in the world to possess an underground telephone, an innovation demonstrated by Alexander Graham Bell in 1877 connecting the colliery underground to the surface, allowing miners to hear sounds from Hedgefield House.

Over the years, the colliery witnessed significant growth in output and employment. By 1923, the colliery's output had reached over a million tons with 5,500 employees

Adjacent to the colliery, Addison Village was a close-knit community of miners and their families. The Stella Coal Company erected a Primitive Methodist Chapel in 1865 and Hedgefield School in 1866, providing essential amenities for the community.

In 1946, a pit explosion resulted in the tragic deaths of two individuals. As the coal seams depleted, the village's population declined and, ultimately, the village was abandoned and demolished in 1958, marking the end of the mining era at the site.

== Trails and Walking Routes ==
The reserve offers a network of unsurfaced footpaths through the woodland area and a footpath with steps from Hedgefield Quarry to Reedside in Ryton. The terrain is mixed and not suitable for wheelchairs, but accessible for children and pushchairs. Some areas of the reserve are challenging for those with limited mobility.

== Wildlife and Flora ==
The nature reserve supports a diverse range of wildflower species and offers habitat for numerous bird species. The site is dominated by non-native tree species such as Sycamore and Beech, with patches of semi-natural woodland containing Ash, Alder, and Birch. The wet grassland area hosts colorful plants like Ragged-Robin, Valerian (herb), and Marsh Marigold, while drier areas support Betony, Pignut, Tormentil, and Lady's Mantle. Scattered scrubland offers cover for bird species like Whitethroat, Yellowhammer, and Willow Warbler. Additionally, the site is inhabited by animals such as Foxes and Roe Deer.

== Visiting ==
The reserve is open at all times, with the best time to visit suggested from April to July. Dogs are allowed but must be kept on a lead.
