= Monkton Coke Works =

Former coke works in Tyne and Wear, England

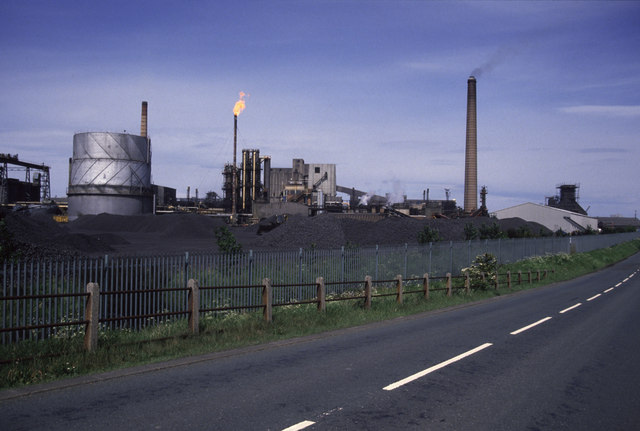
- Monkton Coke Works in 1989

- Location in Tyne and Wear
- 54.957057°N 1.511200°W
- Location: Tyne and Wear, England, UK
- OS grid reference: NZ314626

Monkton Coke Works was a coking plant near Hebburn, Tyne and Wear, England.

== History ==
The works were constructed in 1936, as the government's response to the Jarrow Hunger March in 1932. The plant closed in 1990 and was demolished in 1992. In September 2022, a book called CLEAN AIR was released on Amazon, detailing the campaign for clean air that the community living next to Monkton Coke Works led.
