= Greenside, Tyne and Wear =

Coordinates: 54.954°N 1.783°W

Greenside
- Village
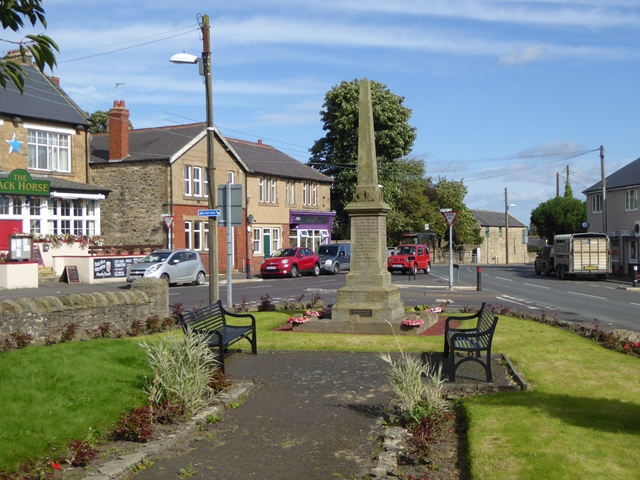
- War memorial

- Location within Tyne and Wear
- Population: 2,557 (2011)
- OS grid reference: NZ139622
- Metropolitan borough: Gateshead
- Metropolitan county: Tyne and Wear
- Region: North East
- Country: England
- Sovereign state: United Kingdom
- Post town: RYTON
- Postcode district: NE40
- Dialling code: 0191
- Police: Northumbria
- Fire: Tyne and Wear
- Ambulance: North East
- UK Parliament: Blaydon and Consett

Greenside is a village in the extreme west of the metropolitan county of Tyne and Wear, England. Once an independent village in County Durham, it became incorporated into Tyne and Wear in 1974 and then the Metropolitan Borough of Gateshead in 1986.

== Location ==
Greenside is in the outer west of Gateshead, between the villages of Crawcrook and High Spen and not far from the small town of Ryton. It lies near the old lead route that ran from the north Pennines to Tyneside.

The hamlet of Coalburns lies about a mile south-west of Greenside, on the Coal Burn.

== History ==
Largely rural in nature, Greenside was built upon coal mining and agriculture. With the creation of Greenside colliery, along with the nearby collieries of Emma, Clara and Stargate, the area grew in importance and its coal industry became extensive. By the early 20th century Greenside had the largest colliery in the district. The colliery closed in July 1966, the last shift being worked on Saturday 23 July.

In 2016 Banner Tales – an organisation dedicated to researching and maintaining the village's mining and industrial heritage – instituted the "Last Shift Festival" and this has now, under the title "Greenside Banner Festival", become an annual event. Each year the Greenside Miner's Lodge Banner is marched through the village accompanied by a Brass Band before joining the many other banners at Durham Miner's Gala. Banner Tales also organise an annual Greenside Community Picnic in the spirit of the miners' picnics of the past.

The wagonways used to transport coal, present in both Greenside and Crawcrook, provide a reminder of the area's importance in the coal trade. Although these routes are not used to transport coal any more, they are maintained as public footpaths, taking walkers through the surrounding countryside.

Greenside has many residents of Irish descent, who can trace their heritage back to the influx of Irish miners into the town in the 19th century.

== Governance ==
In local government, Greenside is within the Crawcrook and Greenside ward, which lies west of Gateshead and borders Northumberland. The population of the ward at the 2011 census was 9,056.

Greenside is within the parliamentary constituency of Blaydon and Consett. Its current MP is Labour's Liz Twist.

== Economy ==
After the decline of the coal industry, Greenside has not suffered the great deprivation that many other former mining areas have. One of the least deprived of Gateshead's wards, it is used increasingly as a commuter village for professionals travelling into the more urban areas of Tyneside.

Although it has not suffered the decline that many provincial villages have nationally in terms of local services, Greenside offers only a small selection of shops and business. For further groceries and white goods, residents can travel to the MetroCentre, Europe's largest shopping centre, around four miles away towards Gateshead, as well as the shopping areas of Newcastle upon Tyne.

There is an adequate, although declining, public transport service. Bus services operate to Crawcrook, Ryton, Blaydon, the MetroCentre and Newcastle. Residents wishing to travel west, past the county border into Northumberland and its towns such as Prudhoe, Stocksfield, Corbridge and Hexham can do so on one of a number of Go North East buses that depart from Crawcrook.

== Notable people ==
- Richard Henry "Dick" Abbott (1924–2017), father of Australian prime minister Tony Abbott, born in Newcastle upon Tyne and raised in Greenside
- Joseph Cowen (1800–1873), Liberal Party politician, member of parliament and manufacturer, born in Greenside
- Thomas Young Hall (1802–1870), mining engineer and coal mine owner, born in Greenside
- Ian Wishart (born 1948), cricketer, born in Greenside
