= Swalwell, Tyne and Wear =

Coordinates: 54.954°N 1.684°W

Swalwell
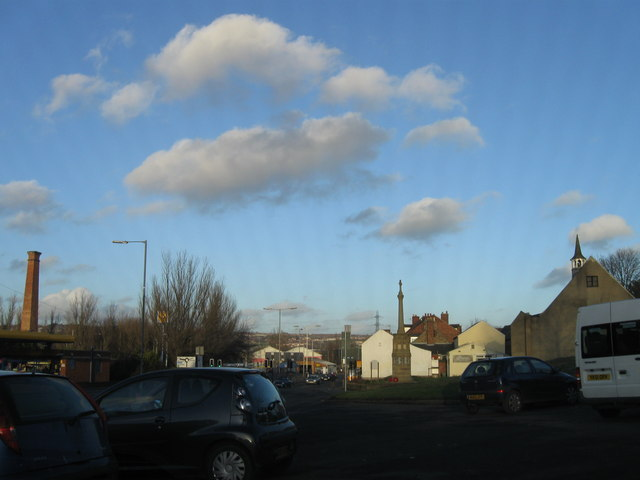
- View from car park

- Location within Tyne and Wear
- Population: 3,200 (2001)
- OS grid reference: NZ203622
- Metropolitan borough: Gateshead
- Metropolitan county: Tyne and Wear
- Region: North East
- Country: England
- Sovereign state: United Kingdom
- Post town: NEWCASTLE UPON TYNE
- Postcode district: NE16
- Dialling code: 0191
- Police: Northumbria
- Fire: Tyne and Wear
- Ambulance: North East
- UK Parliament: Gateshead Central and Whickham

Swalwell is a village in Gateshead, Tyne and Wear, England, which was historically part of County Durham.

== History ==
On 27 August 1640, an encampment of soldiers was gathered in the fields north of Whickham church on the slope down to Swalwell. This was part of the Royalist army of King Charles I preparing to fight the Scots. Information was soon received that the Scots led by General Leslie were crossing the river at Newburn to attack the English at Stella, after which the Whickham contingent would be threatened, and so orders were given to burn the camp at Whickham rather than let it fall into enemy hands. Many of the villagers of Whickham joined in the retreat which followed. The fire at the camp ignited a seam of coal which apparently burned for several years in various places including the Coaly Well. On 7 September 1648 a burial took place at Whickham churchyard of a soldier in Oliver Cromwell's army which was then camped north of the church. Cromwell is supposed to have stayed in Whickham for two days before marching to Scotland down Clockburn Lane on 25 July 1650 on his way to the battle of Dunbar, crossing the Tyne at Newburn and using the ancient route of the cattle drovers.

Prior to the rise of industry, the local economy consisted of agriculture and keelmen. Swalwell Brewery, one of the oldest in the region, began operating in 1765.

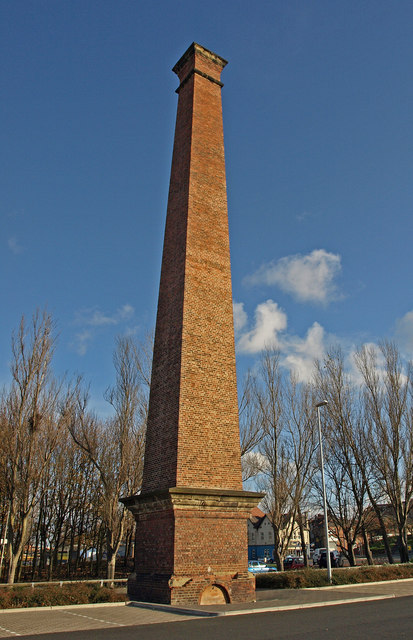
Paper mills chimney

In 1707, Ambrose Crowley opened an ironworks at Swalwell. The location was chosen for its proximity to the River Derwent, enabling the trade of iron with Nordic countries. At four acres, the Salwell work were "the largest ironmaking concern in Europe between 1725 and 1750", and "the greatest on Tyneside". After competing markets grew in the 19th century, Crowley Millington's closed in 1853, and the site was sold to Powe and Faucus and converted into a steel foundry in 1893, which ran until 1911. There was also a presence of Wm Grace and Co, later known as Northumberland Paper Mills, on the site during this period; its chimney still stands.

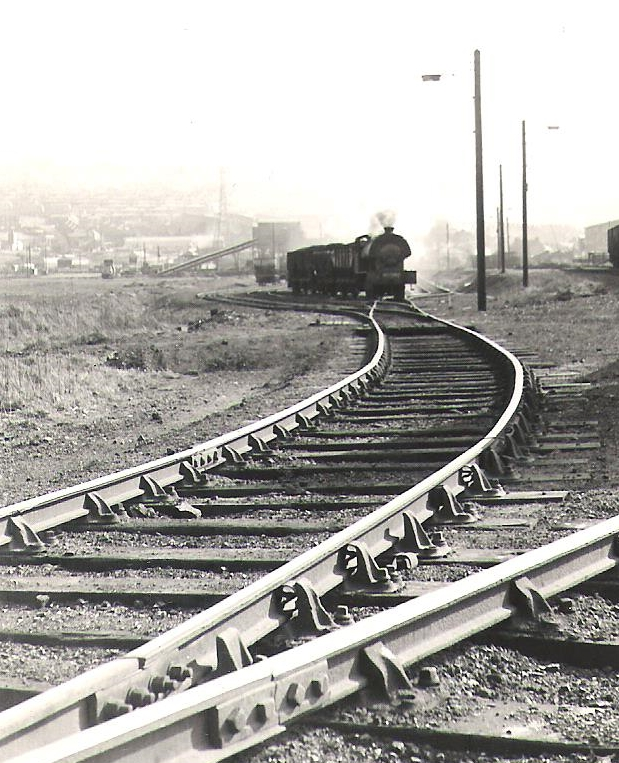
Colliery

There were also a number of collieries in the area, including at Blaydon, Derwenthaugh, Garesfield, and Axwell Park.

In 1870–72 Swalwell had a population of 1,479. There were 190 houses, chapels of United Presbyterians, Wesleyans and Primitive Methodists, and extensive ironworks.

== Sights (points of interest) ==
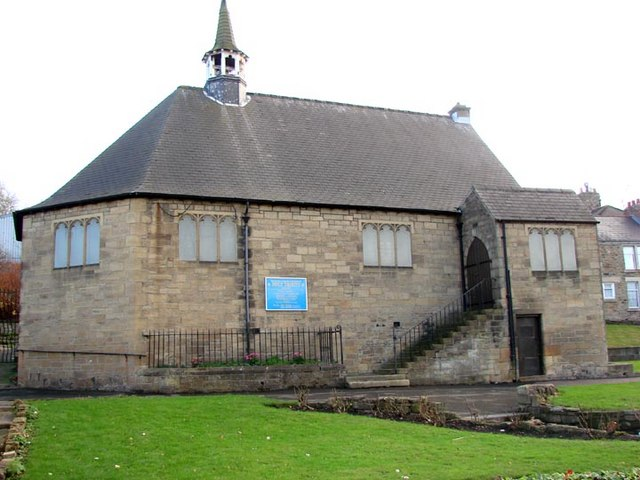
Holy Trinity Church, Swalwell

- Holy Trinity Church
- Swalwell Bridge

== Notable people ==
The following notable people were either born in Swalwell or lived there for a significant period:

- Jimmy Armstrong – professional footballer
- Harry Clasper – professional rower
- Margaret Dryburgh – school teacher and missionary interned by the Japanese in World War II
- Charlton Nesbit – wood-engraver
- William Shield – Master of the King's Music
