= Richard Prosser (priest) =

Richard Prosser D.D.
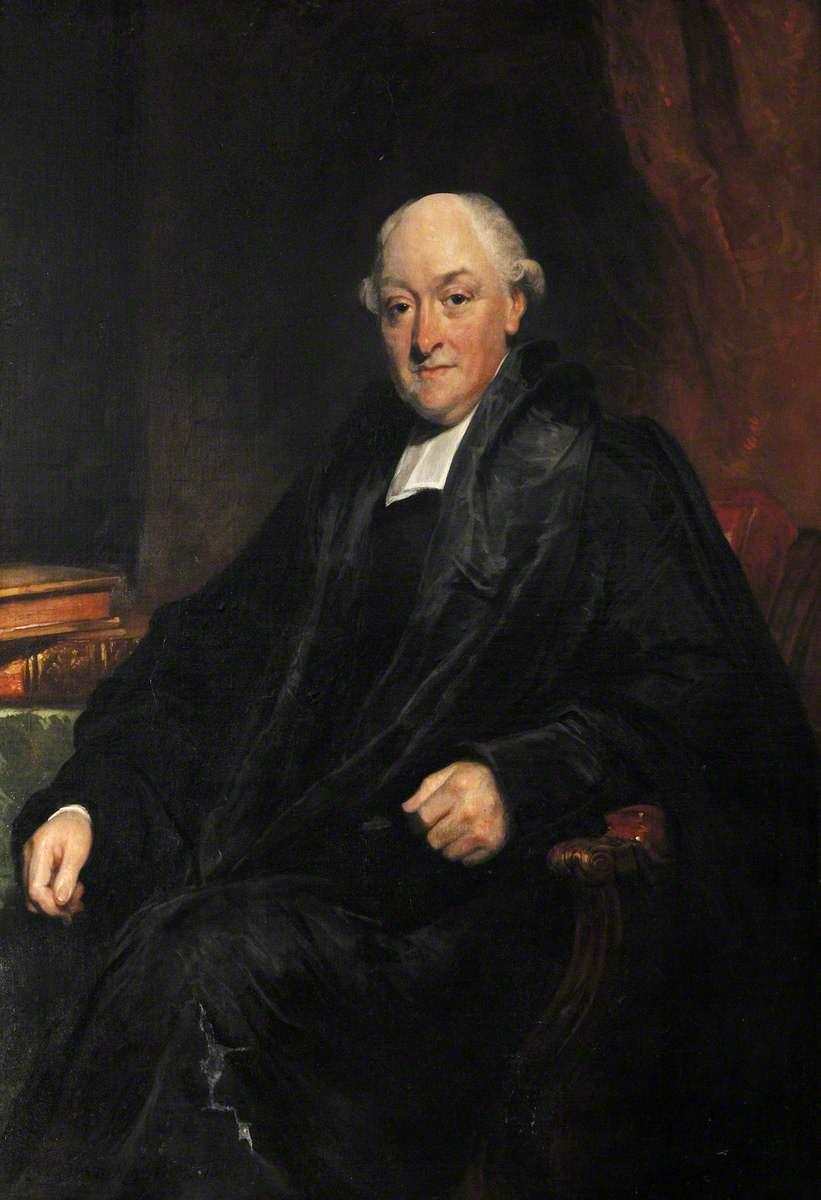
- Portrait of Prosser by William Owen, from 1816
- Born: c.1749
- Died: 1839
- Occupations: cleric and tutor
- Title: The Reverend Dr.

Richard Prosser, DD (1748–1839) was Archdeacon of Durham from 1808 until his death.

He was the son of Humphrey Prosser of Market Drayton, and matriculated at Balliol College, Oxford in 1767, where he graduated B.A. in 1770. He was made a Fellow and graduated M.A. in 1773, B.D. in 1784, and D.D. in 1797.

Prosser served incumbencies in Colchester, Gateshead and Easington. He died on 8 October 1839.
