= High Spen =

Village in the Metropolitan Borough of Gateshead

Coordinates: 54.9312°N 1.7831°W

High Spen is an old mining village in the Metropolitan Borough of Gateshead, historically part of County Durham, England. First recorded in 1379 as a small hamlet called ‘Spen’, the settlement grew in the latter half of the 19th and early 20th centuries with the growth of coal mining in the region. In a modern post-industrial North East England, High Spen functions as a commuter village in the Tyneside greenbelt with 1,935 people calling the village home

== History ==
With the name ‘Spen’ first appearing in record in 1379, it has been hard to discern its true origins, although the best guess is that it means ‘hedge’ or ‘fence’ and it was used as a boundary between the Manors of Winlaton and Chopwell. High Spen saw slow growth until the start of the 19th century when the Marquis of Bute funded the opening of new mines to replace those on Barlow fell. The village experienced rapid growth, from a population of 212 in 1851 up to an all-time high of 2836 in 1911 despite the physical size of the village being considerably smaller than today. This meant on some streets the average number of residents per dwelling could reach as high as 8 people, often in the typical Tyneside flat which was common in the area. Coal was hauled onto the Garesfield and Chopwell railway line, which was only used for freight and never passengers. Trains travelled along the northern bank of the River Derwent until they eventually reached Garesfield staith at the intersection of the Derwent and the River Tyne. Later when LNER took over operation of the railway lines, the coal was also transported to the larger Derwent Haugh and Dunston staiths.

As the decline of mining in the area due to pit exhaustion, lowering demand and deindustrialisation took hold, High Spen was left with a struggling economy as its entire existence had been reliant upon its coal mines. This led to the village being placed in the Category D list by County Durham’s Planning Authority in 1951 along with 120 other areas including Chopwell and Dunston. Category D status meant ‘unfit for human habitation’ and that all funding to the village was cut and further development was outlawed, in addition, residents would be strongly encouraged to leave and once they did so, their houses would be demolished. The policy was described as a ‘slow starvation’ for mining villages in the county with a Growth Minister in Durham saying, ‘It will not be lost when this unworthy environment is finally obliterated’. In 1961, the MP for Blaydon Robert Woof (politician) argued on High Spen’s behalf in the House of Commons, advocating for its survival against the proposed demolition, the Minister for Housing’s reply suggested High Spen residents should merely move to nearby settlements, naming Rowlands Gill and Winlaton. After 26 years without investment and having all development prohibited the Category ‘D’ policy finally came to an end in 1977. Although High Spen survived the policy, unlike other villages in the area like Addison, it was a shell of its former self with a declining and ignored population and a high street which lost most of its vibrant businesses.

== Transport ==
High Spen used to have a bus depot (located off Strothers Road) that was home to the Venture Bus Company. Venture used to run services around Derwent Valley, mainly between Shotley Bridge and Newcastle. Venture, and the bus depot at High Spen, eventually passed into the hands of Northern General Transport Company, where it stayed operational until the late 1980s when it was eventually closed down. Go North East took over as multiple bus routes go through the village. Most notable being the 47 that goes from Consett to Newcastle, also the 10A that goes from Blackhall Mill to Newcastle, (Also an R6 service that is run by Gateshead Taxis) there is scholars buses that run through the weekdays that go to Thorp Academy, St Thomas More Catholic School and Whickham School.

== Notable people ==
During the First World War, two soldiers from High Spen were awarded the Victoria Cross: Lance Corporal Frederick William Dobson of the Coldstream Guards, and Private Thomas Young of the Durham Light Infantry. Other members of the village during World War Two were taken as Prisoner of War during the events of Saint-Valery-en-Caux where they were originally used to keep German soldiers back from Dunkirk to evacuate other members of the British forces.

== Education ==
High Spen currently has High Spen Primary School for children 3-11 but High Spen also used to have a coeducational comprehensive school, Hookergate School, located in the village. The school was closed down in 2011 and pupils from the village moved to neighbouring villages for their secondary education. Most pupils in High Spen attend Thorp Academy in Ryton. Hookergate School got demolished down in 2024 for homes.
