= Winlaton =

Village in Tyne and Wear, England

Coordinates: 54°57′10″N 1°43′40″W

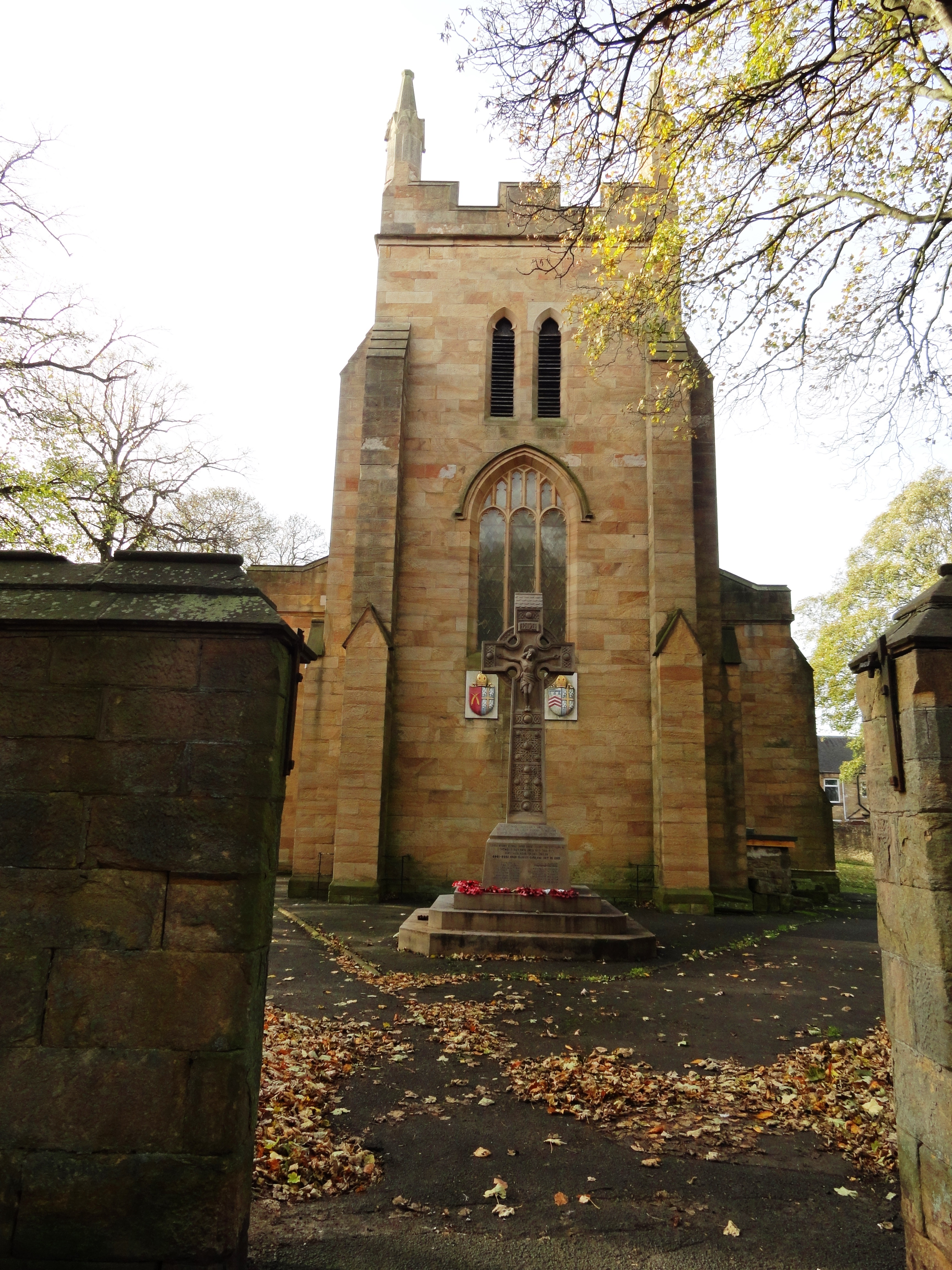
- St Paul's Church

- Location within Tyne and Wear
- Metropolitan borough: Gateshead
- Metropolitan county: Tyne and Wear
- Region: North East
- Country: England
- Sovereign state: United Kingdom
- Post town: Blaydon-on-Tyne
- Postcode district: NE21
- Dialling code: 0191
- Police: Northumbria
- Fire: Tyne and Wear
- Ambulance: North East

Winlaton is a village situated in the Metropolitan Borough of Gateshead, Tyne and Wear, England. Historically in County Durham, it was incorporated into the metropolitan county of Tyne and Wear and Borough of Gateshead in 1974. In 2011 the village was absorbed into the Gateshead MBC ward of Winlaton and High Spen. The population of this ward at the 2011 census was 8,342.

Winlaton's front street is the village's forefront for shopping, as it has a variety of shops, public houses and takeaways. The Winlaton Centre, a local events venue, was built in 1973, and is host to events such as youth clubs and fitness classes.

There is an Anglican church dedicated to St Paul; St Paul's church was built in the 19th–century. There is also a Roman Catholic church, dedicated to St Anne and built in 1962. "Coffee Johnny", a local Blaydon celebrity (1829-1900), is buried at St Paul's church graveyard. He "...would be an outstanding figure in any crowd. Not only was he over six feet six inches and well made (he was a blacksmith at Winlaton), but he was quite a dandy and on special occasions wore a tall white hat."

On one of the edges of the village is Winlaton Rugby Club, first founded in 1896, they were reformed in 1962 and currently play at Axwell View Playing Fields where a clubhouse was erected the following year after moving in.

== History ==
In 1931 the civil parish had a population of 21,837. On 1 April 1937 the parish was abolished and merged with Blaydon, Whickham and Stanley.

=== Industrial history ===
Winlaton was once at the centre of the local steel industry. In 1690, Ambrose Crowley, a Quaker nail-manufacturer, brought over German workmen to establish ironworking at Winlaton. He set up furnaces and forges there and on the River Derwent at Winlaton Mill in 1691. The river was ideally suitable for tempering steel, as the sword-makers of Shotley Bridge also found. Crowley not only produced high-quality nails, but also iron goods such as pots, hinges, wheel-hubs, hatchets and edged tools. He could also make heavy forgings, such as chains, pumps, cannon carriages and anchors up to four tons in weight. In 1770, Arthur Young described the ironworks at Winlaton as 'supposed to be the greatest manufactory of its kind in Europe'. In 1788, The Universal Magazine of Knowledge and Pleasure reported that 'Before Sir Ambrose settled his people there the place (Winlaton) consisted of a few deserted cottages, but now contains about 1,500 inhabitants, mainly smiths'

The gates for Buckingham Palace were also forged in Winlaton. It still has one of the oldest forges remaining in existence, built c1690.

== Sources ==
- Smailes, AE (1960). North England. Edinburgh: Thomas Nelson & Sons Ltd.
