= List of Gateshead blue plaques =

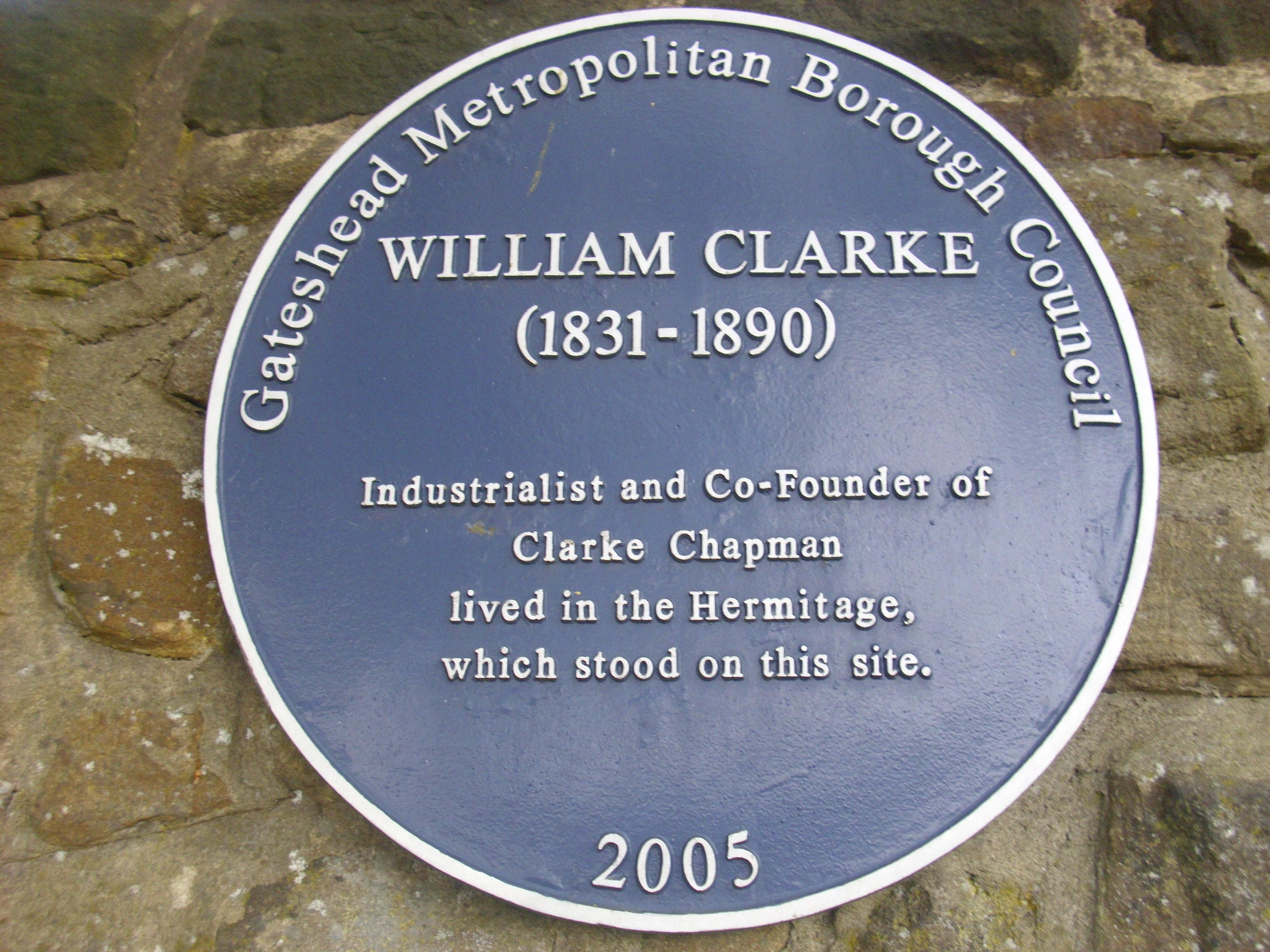
A Gateshead blue plaque honouring William Clarke

A long-running blue plaque scheme is in operation in Gateshead, Tyne and Wear. Administered by the local council, the scheme was registered with English Heritage in 1970 and 21 blue plaques were installed from the inception of the scheme until 1996. Although the scheme was never formally closed, only one further plaque was then unveiled prior to the presentation of a 'report to cabinet' on 16 November 2004 which recommended that the scheme be revived. Seven further plaques were installed prior to the publication of a commemorative council document in 2010, bringing the total to 29, though a number of further plaques have been installed since that date.

The Gateshead scheme aims to highlight notable persons who lived in the borough, notable buildings within it and important historical events. An individual will only be considered for commemoration by Gateshead blue plaque if they meet the suggested criteria laid out in the 2004 'report to cabinet'. These are that the individual has sufficient local standing, is regarded as an eminent member of their profession, calling or field or has made some important contribution to "human welfare or happiness". The individual must have lived in Gateshead and either had a significant impact on the borough or are of such national or international eminence that their association with the borough is itself noteworthy. They must also be deceased. Some of those commemorated through the scheme include Geordie Ridley, author of the Blaydon Races, William Wailes, a noted 19th century proponent of stained glass who lived in a "fairytale mansion" at Saltwell Park, the industrialist and co-founder of Clarke Chapman, William Clarke and Sir Joseph Swan, the inventor of the incandescent light bulb whose house in Low Fell was the first in the world to be illuminated by electric light.

An historical event will be considered suitable for a Gateshead blue plaque so long as it was not a usual occurrence, had a significant impact on local or national history and can be readily associated with a building or structure to which the corresponding plaque can be appended. Events commemorated by Gateshead blue plaque include the 19th century Felling mining disasters, one of which included "one of the most tremendous explosions in the history of coal mining" and which killed 92 men and boys.

== Gateshead blue plaques ==
Subject	Image	Location	Year	Description
William Clarke		Adjacent High Fell Club, Old Durham Road, Sheriff Hill.	2005	In 1864, Clarke founded Clarke Chapman at the South Shore of the River Tyne. By 1903 the company was the second largest employer in Gateshead. From 1873 Clarke lived in a 20-room mansion called 'The Hermitage', which was built on the same land as the wall on which his commemorative plaque is appended.
Sir Vincent Litchfield Raven KBE		Site of former Greenesfield, near High Level Bridge	2011	Raven was an "engineering genius" who was the chief mechanical engineer at the North Eastern Railway where his successes in steam engineering ultimately frustrated his own visionary work on the possibility of electric trains.
Sister Winifred Laver MBE		Gateshead Evangelical Centre, Derwentwater Road, Gateshead.	2011	Birkenhead born Laver was a Methodist missionary who worked with the sick, starving and poor of Gateshead through the Vine Street Mission in Teams which she instituted in 1916. For her work she was awarded the Freedom of Gateshead.
Carter's Well		Adjacent Carter's Lodge, west side of Durham Road, Low Fell.	1995	Public well which was the principal source of drinking and cooking water in Low Fell until the latter part of the 19th century. Restored in 1994.
Madeleine-Hope, Ruth and Sylvia Dodds		Boundary wall of Home House, Low Fell.	2005	The Dodds sisters were renowned public figures during the early part of the 20th century – authors, local politicians and founders of the Little Theatre. They lived at Home House for their entire lives. Plaque unveiled by Joe Mitchinson, Mayor of Gateshead, on 19 October 2005.
William Henry Brockett		King James Street (off Old Durham Road), Gateshead.	2010	Brockett founded the first Gateshead newspaper, The Gateshead Observer, in 1837. He was editor of the paper from 1860 until his death in 1867. He was also heavily involved in local politics; he was a local councillor, alderman and Mayor of Gateshead in 1839–40.
Sir Joseph Wilson Swan		Underhill, Kells Lane, Low Fell.	2005	Swan was a chemist and physicist who invented the incandescent light bulb, demonstrating this to the Literary and Philosophical Society of Newcastle upon Tyne in 1880. His home at Kells Lane, where his blue plaque is now appended, was the first in the world lit by electric light. Swan also revolutionised photography by his patented bromide paper.
Dr. Alfred Cox OBE		Westview House, Bensham Road, Bensham.	2011	Dr. Cox was influential in improving public health in the borough and helped found the Gateshead Queen Victoria Nursing Association and the Gateshead Medical Association. He left the area in 1908 to work for the British Medical Association, where he was appointed Medical secretary in 1912; a post he held for 19 years.
Felling mining disasters		Mulberry Street, Felling.	2012	Unveiled to commemorate the 200th anniversary of an explosion in John Pit at Felling Colliery which killed 92 men and boys. Plaque is situated at a site corresponding with the original entrance to the colliery and was unveiled after a parade by local residents and schoolchildren.
Felling mining disasters (2)		Boundary wall, St Mary's Church, Heworth.	2012	Unveiled to commemorate the 200th anniversary of an explosion in John Pit at Felling Colliery which killed 92 men and boys. A memorial for those who died is on the church grounds. Plaque was unveiled after a parade by local residents and schoolchildren.
George "Geordie" Ridley		Outer wall, William IV public house, High Street, Gateshead.	1995	Born and bred in Gateshead, Ridley was a coal miner who was less notable in his lifetime than his brother but is now remembered as composer and performer of the Blaydon Races. The plaque is located on the site of his former home.
William Wailes		Saltwell Towers, Saltwell Park.	2005	Wailes was a native of Newcastle upon Tyne who became one of the leading exponents of stained glass in England. His work can still be seen today in cathedrals at Chichester and Newcastle upon Tyne as well as at the restored Saltwell Towers; a "fairytale mansion" which he designed for him and his family in the mid 19th century.
Blaydon Races		Shibdon Road, Blaydon-on-Tyne.	2012	Plaque unveiled to celebrate 150th anniversary of the first running of the original Blaydon Race, along with a sculpture from Andrew Mckeown and the renaming of a train at Newcastle Central Station
William Shield		Hood Street/Market Lane, Swalwell.	2009	Shield, born 1748, was a popular composer whose most notable work was the light opera Rosina, which continues to give rise to claims in several places that he, rather than Robert Burns, is the original composer of Auld Lang Syne – indeed, school children present at the plaque unveiling sang a rendition of the song.
Katherine Githa Sowerby		Entrance to The Drive, Durham Road, Low Fell.	2009	Sowerby, described by The Spectator in 2013 as a playwright, suffragette and Fabian, was the daughter of a noted Gateshead glass maker and grew up in the town. Despite having been a "forgotten playwright" during much of her life and after her death in 1970, she is best known for her critically acclaimed play Rutherford and Son.
High Level Bridge		East side of the central pier, High Level Bridge	2008	Opened in 1845, the High Level Bridge linking Gateshead and Newcastle upon Tyne over the Tyne was the first bridge in the world to combine road and rail travel. Designed by Robert Stephenson, it is now a Grade I listed bridge.
High Level Bridge Lamps		West side of the central pier, High Level Bridge	2008	Plaque commemorating the original lamps which still span the length of the bridge. A£171,000 project to restore these and convert them from gas to electric was completed in 2008 as part of a wider £40m bridge restoration project. The completed work was awarded a Grand Prize Europa Nostra Award in 2009.
Tyne Bridge 75th Anniversary		West side of South Tower, Tyne Bridge, Hillgate	2003	Plaque commemorating the 75th anniversary of the opening of the Tyne Bridge – a steel and granite symbol of the Tyneside's industrial heritage described by the BBC as "one of the great bridges of the world" – by George V in 1928.
Arthur Holmes		19 Primrose Hill, Low Fell	2005	Born in 1890, geologist Holmes recognised that the earth was billions, rather than millions, of years old. His textbook Principles of Physical Geology is seminal work in the field and he was the first Professor of Geology at Durham University, where they have named a Geological society in his honour
William and Catherine Booth		15 Woodbine Place, Bensham	2005	William Booth came with his wife Catherine to Gateshead in 1858 where he was appointed minister to the Gateshead Methodist circuit. His preaching at the Bethesda Chapel was "immediately successful" and it was not uncommon for 2,000 people to fill the chapel and hear him preach. He left Gateshead for London in 1861 and in 1865 the Booths founded The Salvation Army.
The 1854 Fire		East side of south tower, Tyne Bridge, Hillgate.	2004 (Note: This is almost certainly a replacement of an earlier plaque; see for example a photograph hosted by academic Brian Pears who claims an original plaque was sited here in 1978)	At 12.30am on Friday 6 October 1854, Wilson & Sons Worsted Manufactory at Gateshead quayside caught fire and the intense heat ignited sulphur and other combustibles in the nearby Bertrams Warehouse. The subsequent explosion resulted in the complete destruction of most of Gateshead and Newcastle quaysides and the loss of 53 lives.
The Gateshead Dispensary		South of old Dispensary building, Nelson Street	1982	The dispensary was instituted by Rev. John Collinson, William Brockett and others after a cholera epidemic starting in December 1831 killed 234 Gateshead residents over 11 months. The dispensary opened on 2 November 1832 and provided medical help to the sick poor. It closed in 1946.
Daniel Defoe		South side of Hillgate, adjacent St. Mary's Square	1995	Author Defoe is thought to have lived at Hillgate around 1710 with a bookseller named Joseph Button. It had been said that he wrote his most famous work, Robinson Crusoe, whilst residing in the town but this has now been refuted.
Brandling Station		North wall of station building, Mulberry Street, Felling	1978	Plaque commemorating the restoration of the original stone station building in 1978. The Brandling Station was built on the Brandling Junction Railway in 1842 and is one of the oldest railway stations in the world. The station is now partially used as Felling Metro station whilst the restored building is a Grade II listed urban studies centre.
River Police Station		East wall of former station building, adjacent Swing Bridge	1986	The River Tyne Police have patrolled the river since 1845 – in their earliest days they used rowing boats and cutlasses. The plaque commemorates the opening of the Pipewellgate Station, built by Fenwicke and Watson, in 1910.
Emily Davies		East side of Bensham Road at junction of Rectory Road	1995	Born in 1830 in Southampton, Davies' family moved to Gateshead in 1839 when her father John became Rector of the town. Davies travelled to London in the late 1850s and returned to Gateshead to champion women's rights before founding Girton College, Cambridge in 1864.
Alex Glasgow		59 Church Road, Sheriff Hill/Low Fell boundary	2006	Socialist singer/songwriter Alex Glasgow, the so-called "bard of Tyneside", is best remembered for writing and singing the theme tune to the BBC television classic When the Boat Comes In. The blue plaque is at his former family home.
Robert Spence Watson		South wall Bensham Grove, Bensham Road.	1995	Spence Watson was a Quaker who lived in Bensham Grove his entire life. He was a founding partner of Watson Burton LLP in Newcastle but is better known as an educational reformer who was made president of the Literary and Philosophical Society of Newcastle upon Tyne in 1901 and was instrumental in the creation of the Durham College of Science which ultimately became Newcastle University.

== Bibliography ==
- Crawford, Elizabeth (2013). Women's Suffrage Movement: A reference guide 1866–1926. Taylor & Francis. ISBN 978-0415239264.
- MacKenzie and Ross (1834). An Historical, Topographical and Descriptive View of the County Palatine of Durham. McKenzie and Ross. ISBN 1-150796-79-0.
- Manders, Francis William David (1973). A History of Gateshead. Gateshead Corporation. ISBN 0-901273-02-3.
- Unknown (1855). A Record of the Great Fire in Newcastle and Gateshead. Routledge.
