= Saltwell Park =

Park in Gateshead, England

- The People's Park
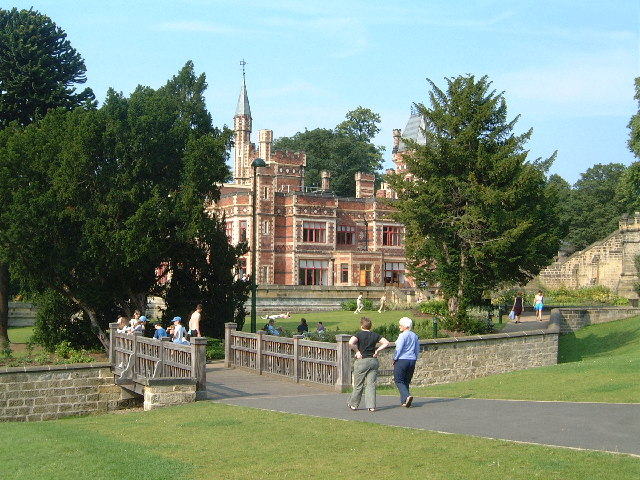
- Bridge leading to Saltwell Towers

- Location within Tyne and Wear
- Type: City park
- Location: Gateshead, Tyne and Wear
- OS grid: NZ253612
- Coordinates: 54.945°N 1.606°W
- Area: 55 acres (22 ha)
- Created: 1876
- Designer: Edward Kemp
- Operator: Gateshead Council
- Visitors: Over 2,000,000 (2012)
- Open: Summer 1876
- Status: Open all year round
- Website: Saltwell Park

Saltwell Park is a Victorian park in Gateshead, Tyne and Wear, England. Opened in 1876, the park was designed by Edward Kemp and incorporates the mansion and associated grounds of the Saltwellgate estate owner, William Wailes, who sold his estate to Gateshead Council for £35,000. Upon opening, it became known as "The People's Park". The park was expanded in 1920 when the council purchased the adjacent gardens to the Saltwell Grove estate and added these to the park. This extended the park's total size to 55 acres (22 ha). Towards the end of the 20th century, the park had fallen into disrepair, but between 1999 and 2005, it was subject to a £9.6 million restoration project, funded collaboratively by the Heritage Lottery Fund and Gateshead Council and is now host to around 2 million visitors per year.

The park is split broadly into three sections. Saltwell Grove, the southern section, is an area of grassed open space with a bandstand to the western corner. The central area contains the centrepiece of the park – Wailes's former home, the Grade II listed Saltwell Towers and its surrounding belvedere walls. These have been fully restored and are now a visitor centre. There are also three war memorials, a yew-tree maze, a dene named The Dene (also known as Saltwell Park Dene or Saltwell Dene) and an area containing several species of caged animals known as Pet's Corner. The largest section of the park is the Northern Fields section which contains a four-acre boating lake with a wooded island at its centre, as well as three bowling greens and two pavilions.

Saltwell Park has been presented with numerous awards in recent years, including being named "Britain's Best Park" in 2005 and Civic Trust Park of the Year in 2006. It has won a Green Flag award every year since 2006 and in 2013 it was re-listed as one of fifty-five Green Heritage sites in the UK. The park has been a social hub for over a century; an annual public bonfire night display was first held in 1883, a circus in 1886 and the park hosted the Holidays at Home programme during World War II. Today the bonfire display has grown into one of the largest in Tyne and Wear and is attended by thousands of people every year. In October 2012, Saltwell Park was the site of the first British Legion Field of Remembrance in North East England. It also plays a role in local sport and recreation; it has hosted a fundraising day in support of Sport Relief, a Race for Life for a number of years and in November 2012 a "green gym" was installed at the park – one of only two in Gateshead.

== Conception and opening ==
At the turn of the 19th century, Gateshead was beginning to expand but, save a smattering of industrial elements mainly at Sheriff Hill and at the south shore of the River Tyne, the town and its surrounds were mostly agricultural and most of the town was covered by large, private estates. The largest of these was the Saltwell estate, which consisted of around 500 acres (200 ha) of land in a broad quadrangle between the Team Valley and the villages of Bensham and Low Fell. In 1805 this estate was broken up into a number of smaller properties including Saltwell Cottage. By 1856 Saltwell Cottage had become the Saltwellside estate and was in the hands of William Wailes, a native of Newcastle upon Tyne who had become one of the leading exponents of stained glass in England. In 1856 Wailes commissioned the design of a grand Victorian mansion for his family to live at Saltwellside. Work began in 1859 and continued until 1871 when Wailes' Saltwell Towers was finally completed. Saltwell Towers was a large, eclectic mansion in red brick with Gothic turrets and mock battlements.

Saltwell Towers, the home of William Wailes

While Wailes was building Saltwell Towers, Gateshead was expanding and industrialising. The resultant air pollution, poor social conditions and general shortage of clean drinking water in the town led to concern about public health and gave rise to calls for the creation of public parks. One such call was made in 1857 when the editorial of the local newspaper, the Gateshead Observer, demanded that a park be built at Windmill Hills. In 1861, the owners of ten acres of land at Windmill Hills approached the town council and offered the land free of charge so long as it was used as a place of recreation for the people of Gateshead. The land was formally conveyed on 18 November 1861 and the opening of the first public park in Gateshead was celebrated by the closing of workplaces and a day of holiday in the town.

Gateshead Council subsequently considered other sites for a second park, but it was discouraged by the high prices being asked by the estate owners at Redheugh and Shipcote. The Shipcote estate was owned by Sir Walter James, who was approached by a council park committee in 1874 and asked how much would be required to purchase at least part of his estate. Whilst negotiations were ongoing, James' offer to sell part of his estate at £650 per acre was met by fierce criticism from members of the public and the council began to seek an alternative to the Shipcote proposal. The town clerk wrote to William Wailes to ask if he would be willing to sell his 37 acres (15 ha) Saltwellside estate. On 11 November 1874, Wailes replied that the council could have his entire estate for £32,000, (Note: This equates to around £1.7m today.) and in March 1875 James told the park committee that he did not wish to compete with Wailes but that he would offer a subscription if the council went ahead at Saltwellgate. Later that month the park committee formally opened talks with Wailes and, after various proposals were considered and rejected, in September 1875 the council decided to buy the entire Saltwellgate estate for an increased total price of £35,000 after securing a loan for the full amount from the Local Government Board. The agreement was formalised two months later and included a provision to lease Saltwell Towers back to Wailes for the remainder of his life.

Having obtained the Saltwellgate estate, the council contacted local ornithologist and landscaper John Hancock and asked him to submit designs for the new park. When Hancock refused, citing the pressure of his existing work, the park committee retained Edward Kemp at four guineas a day until his plans were submitted and approved in February 1876. Kemp's plans were implemented over a period of years by borough surveyor James Bowyer at a cost of around £11,000. Original plans to officially open the park on Whit Monday 1876 were not realised, and the park was never officially opened, but nonetheless, public usage began in late 1876.

== Design and layout ==
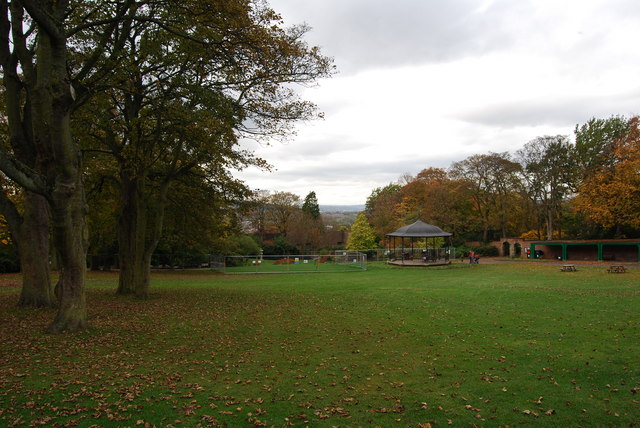
Saltwell Grove

Saltwell Park is located within a residential area around 1.5 kilometres (0.93 mi) south of Gateshead town centre on land which slopes towards the Team Valley in the west. It is a broad rectangle with boundaries at East and West Park Roads, Saltwell View and Saltwell Road South. The original site purchased from Wailes was joined by the gardens of a late 19th century villa at East Park Road known as Saltwell Grove (or "The Grove") after these were purchased by Gateshead Council in 1920. The park today constitutes around 55 acres (22 ha) of land in total.

The park is split into three sections – southern, central and northern areas – and the entire park is bordered by perimeter shrubs, plants and trees. The southern Saltwell Grove area is demarcated from the central section by an old stone wall running in a west–east direction which formed the park's original southern boundary and is, according to a Gateshead Council document, an "important feature in the history and development of the park". This section consists largely of open space, meandering pathways skirting the perimeter, a bandstand and some flowerbeds. Entrances to this section of the park are to the west at Saltwell Road and to the extreme south-east corner.

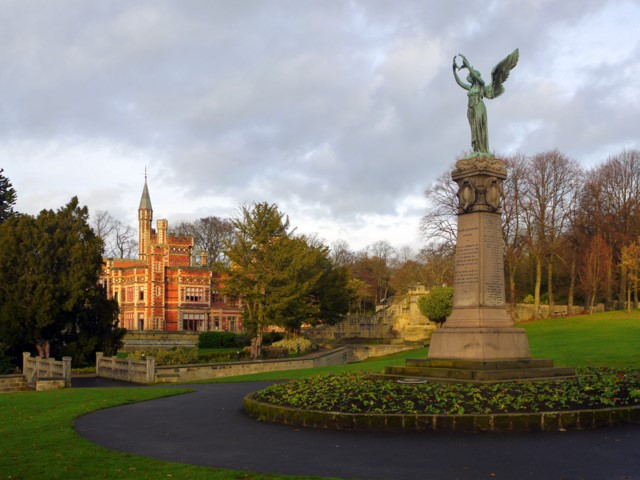
The central section of the park

The central section comprises Saltwell Towers and its grounds and is some 17 acres (6.9 ha) in total area. Saltwell Towers is located in the middle of the central section of the park and it is surrounded to the south by its accompanying walls, walkways and ha-ha. An enclosed rose garden lies to the east of the building and to the west there is a maze and a dene through which a stream runs into a lily-pond at an entrance to the park at Saltwell Road South. The approach from the southern section is a large grassed area replete with paths which wind towards a footbridge to the Towers, which is used for general leisure activities and picnicking and is home to a stone-built war memorial. The entrance to the footbridge is the site of a bronze war memorial which sits in the centre of a roundabout surrounded by bedding flowers. The footbridge was built in 2003 and is also a war memorial.

The northern fields

The northern section of the park constitutes 19 acres (7.7 ha) of land and can be accessed either by external entrances at the north-eastern corner of the park and West Park Road or internally from the central section through the dene or from Pets Corner. The north-eastern entrance consists of a pair of imposing gateposts and the view from this access point sweeps across the entire northern section of the park. The eastern perimeter of this section is a terraced walkway known as the Broadwalk with adjacent, banked bedded planting. A central path from the Broadwalk splits a large grassed area almost neatly in half and leads to a lake and two child's play areas. A path circles the perimeter of the lake and seating is placed at the fringe of the lake at various points. To the south of the lake are three bowling greens and to the north are tennis courts. These cannot be seen from the lake due to a screen of plants. The plants within the screen are typical of those bedded throughout the park, which include French marigolds, roses, tulips, phlomis, sedum and silver dust.

== Principal attractions ==
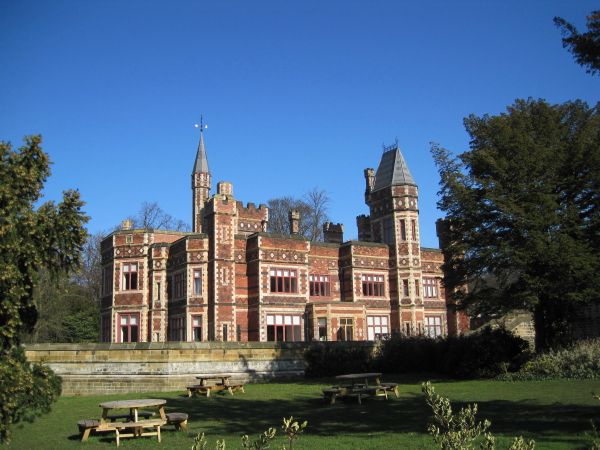
View of Saltwell towers and a picnic area beneath the belvedere wall

There are eleven listed buildings in Saltwell Park. Saltwell Towers, former home of William Wailes and later to lawyer Joseph Shipley (founder of the nearby Shipley Art Gallery), was the seat of the former Saltwellgate estate and has been described by a BBC report as a "fairytale mansion". The building is a dark red and yellow brick construction with asymmetrical towers, tall chimney stacks and corner turrets. It has been used for a number of purposes, including as a hospital during the First World War and as a museum from 1933 to 1969, but was then abandoned and fell into considerable disrepair. However, after a £3 million, five-year refurbishment programme was completed in 2004, the building was officially reopened as a visitors centre in the presence of Wailes' great-great-grandson. Saltwell Towers today includes a cafe, some pieces of local art, an exhibition on the history of the park and also a stained glass centrepiece commissioned from a local artist. A Gateshead Blue Plaque in commemoration of Wailes was installed in 2005. The mansion was protected in 1973 as a Grade II listed building, along with the two storey, sandstone belvedere walls which surround the west and south of the mansion. These are replete with stairs and corner battlements and the entire walls are conjoined by a walkway which is open to the public.

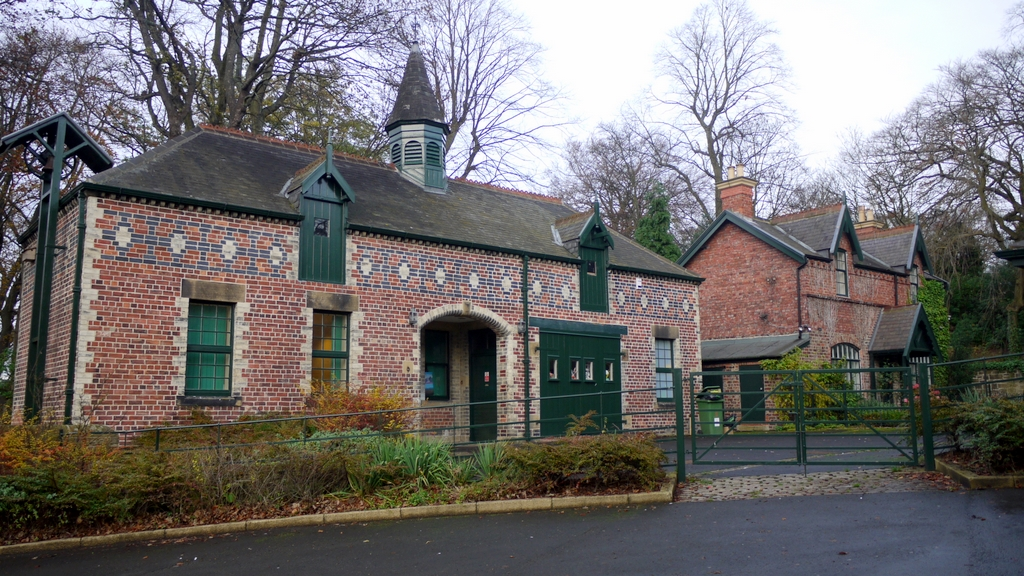
The renovated stable block

A stable block is at the north-west of Saltwell Towers, built in 1871 in the same style as the mansion in red brick and with a slate roof. This is a Grade II listed building and is now an educational area for schools and local community groups. Also to the north-west of Saltwell Towers is the Charlton Memorial Drinking Fountain, a stone and granite fountain inscribed in memory of George Charlton, the mayor of Gateshead between 1874 and 1875. This is Grade II listed, as is the 'Salte Well' at the west entrance to the central section of the park. The latter is dated 1872 and is a sandstone construction with a basin in the central alcove. Midway along the Broadwalk in the north section of the park is a Grade II listed bronze statue of Alderman John Lucas, mounted on a sandstone plinth and granite base. Built in 1902, it was paid for by public subscription. The wrought iron gates and accompanying stone piers which greet visitors at the north-eastern entrance to the park are also Grade II listed.

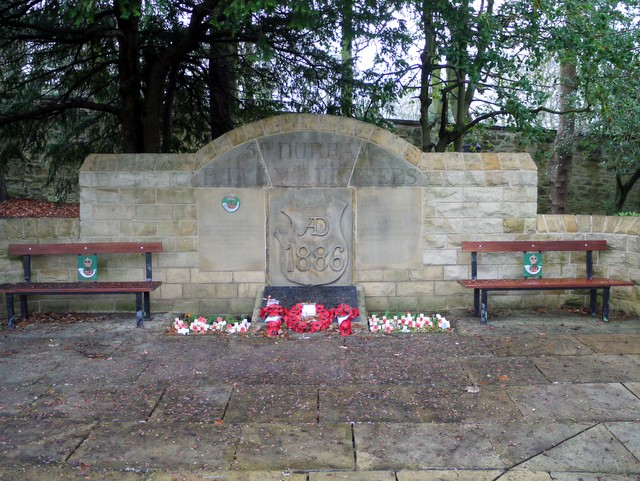
The Durham Light Infantry war memorial

There are three war memorials in the park. There is a Boer War memorial in the central section of the park around 100 metres south of Saltwell Towers. This consists of a bronze angel perched on a granite plinth and dated 1905. A modern Durham Light Infantry memorial was unveiled on 12 July 1981 by the mayor of Newcastle. This takes the form of a sandstone wall with adjoining flanking walls which create a small ornamental garden. There are three plaques and a description commemorating men of the battalion who died in battle between 1900 and 1945. The third war memorial is the bridge adjoining the lawned, central gardens to the belvedere walls of Saltwell Towers. This timber footbridge, 22 feet (6.7 m) long and 12 feet (3.7 m) wide, is named the Primosole Bridge and is a copy of the original Edwardian bridge which once crossed the ha-ha. The name is carved onto a low stone wall which runs alongside and an inscription commemorates the men of the Durham Light Infantry who died whilst crossing the original Primosole Bridge during Operation Fustian in the Second World War.

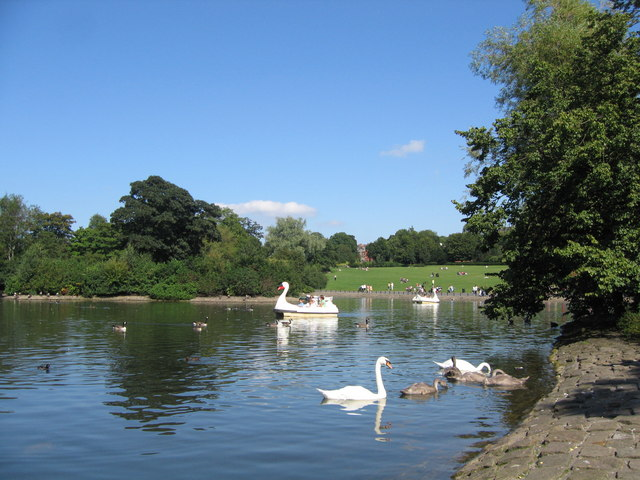
The boating lake in summer

The principal feature of the northern section of the park is a boating lake. This has been in situ since a tender to install a 4 acres (1.6 ha) lake with an island in the centre was accepted in August 1880. An approach to Joseph Swan to illuminate the lake received no response, but a further approach to John Hancock to design the lake edge was more successful; the lake edge today still follows Hancock's original design. Model boating has been a fixture of the lake since 1886 and the Saltwell Park Model Boat Club is the latest organisation to use the lake for this purpose. The island in the centre of the lake was in 1909 home to a bandstand, and visiting performers were required to travel by boat to the island, but the bandstand was moved to the Saltwell Grove section of the park in 1921. During the summer months, visitors can hire rowing boats and pedalos for use on the lake. The lake has long been inhabited by mallards and tufted ducks and it is also home to several other species of wildfowl, including mute swans, Canada and barnacle geese, coots and moorhens. Common pochard and great crested grebes also inhabit the lake in winter after migrating from Russia and central Europe. Kingfishers are also reported to have returned to the lake after a lengthy absence.

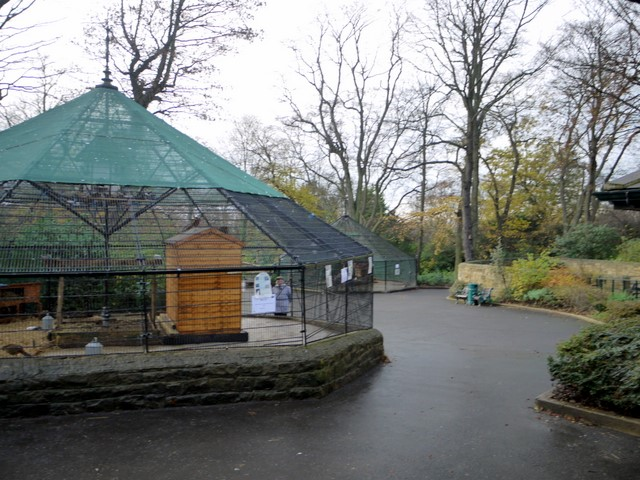
Pets Corner

There have been animals kept in Saltwell Park since June 1877 – initially, these included monkeys, deer and a raccoon. Caged animals are still kept in the north-east of the park in an area called "Pets Corner", where there are a peacock and peahen, pheasants, rabbits and guinea pigs kept in a pair of aviaries built in 1880 and paid for by John Elliot, then chief constable of Gateshead. The aviaries are stone and wrought iron, octagonal constructions which were listed at Grade II by English Heritage in 1973. A bandstand was erected in 1876 and was subsequently replaced in May 1895 by an octagonal, red-brick, cast-iron and wood structure which was first sited in the northern fields. This was then moved to the island in the lake and moved again to Saltwell Grove. It was taken down and rebuilt at Beamish Museum in 1978, where it remains in use and has been designated a Grade II listed building. The present bandstand is in the Saltwell Grove area and is used every Sunday during the summer months by brass bands.

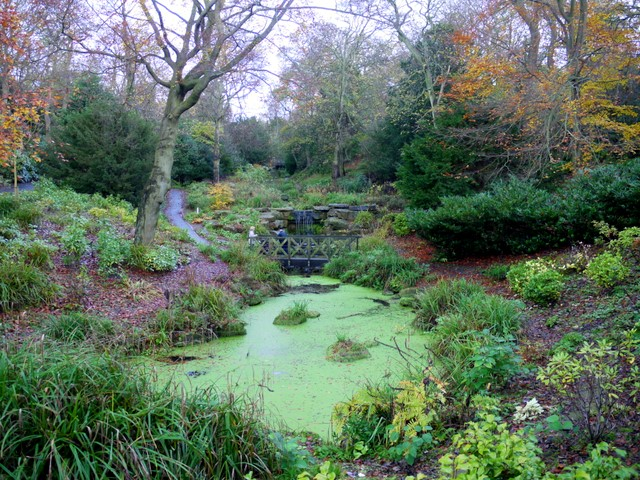
Saltwell Dene

In the western shadow of Saltwell Towers there is a maze, built in 1877 by Wailes for his family's use. The maze was replanted with yew trees as part of the 2005 regeneration project to the original plans laid by Wailes. Also renovated was Saltwell Dene, a picturesque wooded area with a stream, bridges, cascades and a lily pond which inspired local artist Thomas Miles Richardson to paint a watercolour of it in the 19th century. Saltwell Dene was the final part of the 21st century restoration project to be completed, reopening to the public in March 2005. At either end of the Broadwalk there are two wooden shelters whilst the centre of the Broadwalk is marked by the Almond Pavilion. The pavilion was opened in 1881 and was a refreshment pavilion for decades before it fell into disrepair; by the 1980s it was derelict and it was then completely destroyed by fire. It has been fully reconstructed, including a replica of the original clock tower, and is once more a refreshment kiosk with new toilet facilities. It offers panoramic views into the northern fields and across the boating lake. An oriental garden was opened in 2011 to mark the twenty-year anniversary of the twinning arrangement between Gateshead and Komatsu. This includes a gravel pond, waterfalls and stone lanterns. The park is also host to three well-used bowling greens, replete with their own pavilion (the Avenue Green Pavilion) and a rose garden.

Various other attractions have been installed and subsequently removed from the park, including a paddling pool, a museum and, from 1982 to 1993, a retired and modified Vickers Viscount 701 airplane. The aircraft had its wings cut short and was marked "Saltwell Airways".

== Awards and usage ==
Upon opening, Saltwell Park was also called 'The People's Park' and the name is still used locally today. Today, the park is a green lung in the centre of the Metropolitan Borough of Gateshead which attracts over two million visitors a year. In 2005 it was named "Britain's Best Park". In 2006 the park was chosen as Civic Trust Park of the Year and received a Gold Laurel Award from the Institute of Maintenance and Building Management. The park has won a Green Flag Award every year since 2006 and was in 2013 re-listed as one of fifty-five Green Heritage sites in the UK.

The park has long been a hub of local social activities and events. A public firework display was first held in 1883, the first circus was hosted in 1886 and the Holidays at Home programme was conducted there during World War II – from September 1942 to the end of the war, families and American G.I.s could enjoy donkey rides, dancing, brass bands and gymnastic events. A bonfire night fireworks display has been held at the park for many years, one of three public displays in Gateshead (the other two are at Barmoor in Ryton and Oliver Henderson Park in Leam Lane). This event has grown into one of the largest displays in Tyne and Wear and is attended by thousands of people. In October 2012, Saltwell Park was the site of the first British Legion Field of Remembrance in North East England. Around ten thousand crosses were planted in Saltwell Grove. An Enchanted Parks event was hosted for the seventh consecutive year in December 2012. This is a collection of winter-themed visual arts, sculpture and interactive features which attracts around 14,000 visitors every year. An annual sculpture day has been held at the park for twenty-seven years and members of the public are invited to build themed sculptures under the supervision of local professionals. The 2012 renewal, themed "Wonders of the World", was held in Saltwell Grove and attracted hundreds of families.

Saltwell Park has hosted a Race for Life – a national fundraising event for women only, organised by Cancer Research UK – for a number of years. The 5 kilometres (3.1 mi) course has been attempted by over 8,000 competitors in the last three years, with the latest renewal held in May 2012. On 21 March 2010 the park hosted a fundraising day in support of Sport Relief, a bi-annual charity event organised by the BBC. Three fun runs around the boating lake attracted over 4,000 participants in total, including Jayne Middlemiss, Andrew Hayden Smith and Futureheads guitarist David Craig. Local athletics club Saltwell Harriers have hosted an annual 10 kilometres (6.2 mi) race in and around Saltwell Park since 1911. Named the Ronnie Walker Saltwell Road Race since 2010 in honour of the long-standing club president, it is the oldest road race in England. 1984 Olympic silver medallist Mike McLeod won the race for 16 consecutive years between 1974 and 1990. In November 2012 a "green gym" was opened at the park. Fitness equipment was installed near the tennis courts in the Northern Fields section of the park and is available for use by the public free of charge. This is one of only two such outdoor public gyms in Gateshead, the other being opened simultaneously at Windy Nook Nature Reserve. A Parkrun takes place every Saturday morning at 9 am starting and finishing at the South Pavilion. As well as physical health, the park is now home to the Recovery College Collective, a peer led mental health charity offering informal drop ins and creative workshops.
