= C. A. Parsons and Company =

Former British engineering firm

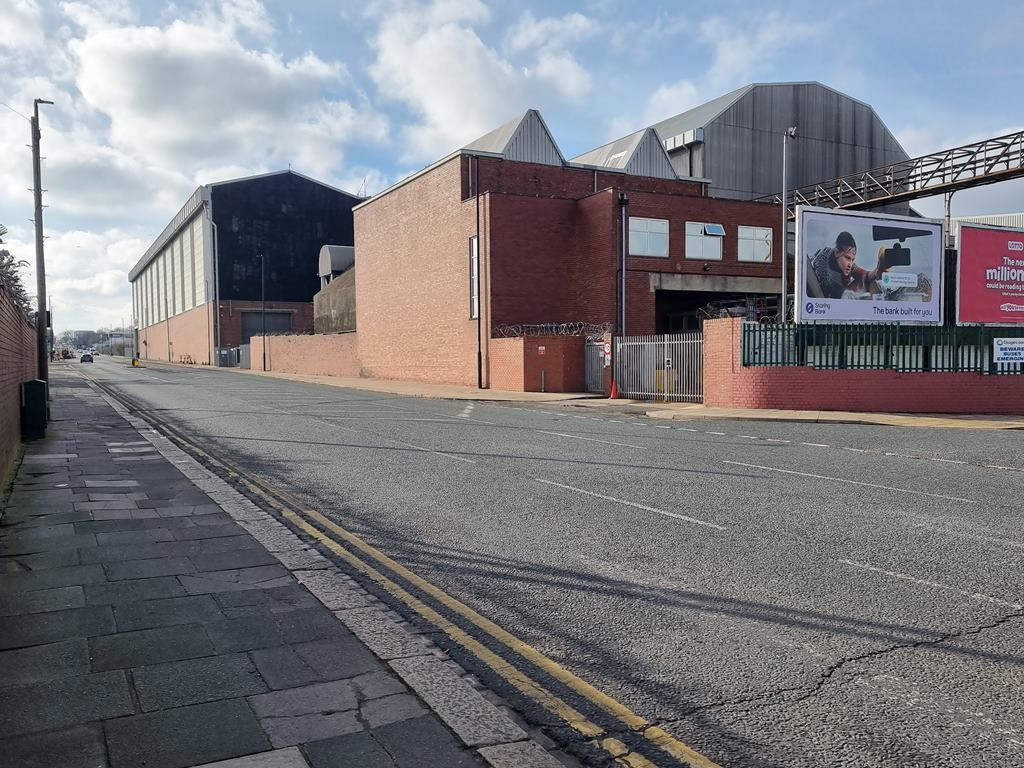
- Factory in Shields Road, Newcastle upon Tyne
- Type: Public
- Industry: Engineering
- Founded: 1889
- Founder: Charles Algernon Parsons
- Defunct: 1997
- Fate: Acquired
- Successor: Siemens Energy
- Headquarters: Newcastle upon Tyne, England
- Key people: Rachel Mary Parsons; Claude Gibb
- Products: Power generation equipment
- Number of employees: 7000 (1960s)

C. A. Parsons and Company was a British engineering firm. It was once one of the largest employers on Tyneside as well as the UK's sole indigenous designer and manufacturer of large marine steam turbines.

Established in 1889 for the purpose of commercialising the steam turbine, which founder Charles Algernon Parsons had recently invented. One of the earliest applications of Parsons-built turbines was the Forth Banks Power Station, the world's first facility to produce electricity using turbo generators. Throughout the 1890s and 1900s, the firm refined its turbine designs, producing them for both land and maritime purposes, while various other engineering firms quickly secured licences from Parsons to produce their own turbines. Charles Algernon Parsons' son, Algernon George "Tommy" Parsons, worked as a director at the company, but was replaced by his sister, Rachel Mary Parsons, when he was called up for military service in the First World War.

Sir Claude Gibb joined the company as a fitter in the 1920s, he became its chairman and managing director by the 1940s. Between 1945 and 1960, the company grew in size three-fold and large parts of the company's works at Heaton, Walkergate and Longbenton Works were rebuilt and expanded. Furthermore, Parsons took over the turbine and generator factories in Erith and Witton of the General Electric Company in the 1960s. Britain's postwar programme of building nuclear power stations made use of Parsons steam turbines. In 1968, the company merged with A. Reyrolle & Company to form Reyrolle Parsons; it subsequently merged with Clarke Chapman to form Northern Engineering Industries in 1977, and became part of Rolls-Royce in 1989. Presently, the company is part of Siemens Energy.

== History ==
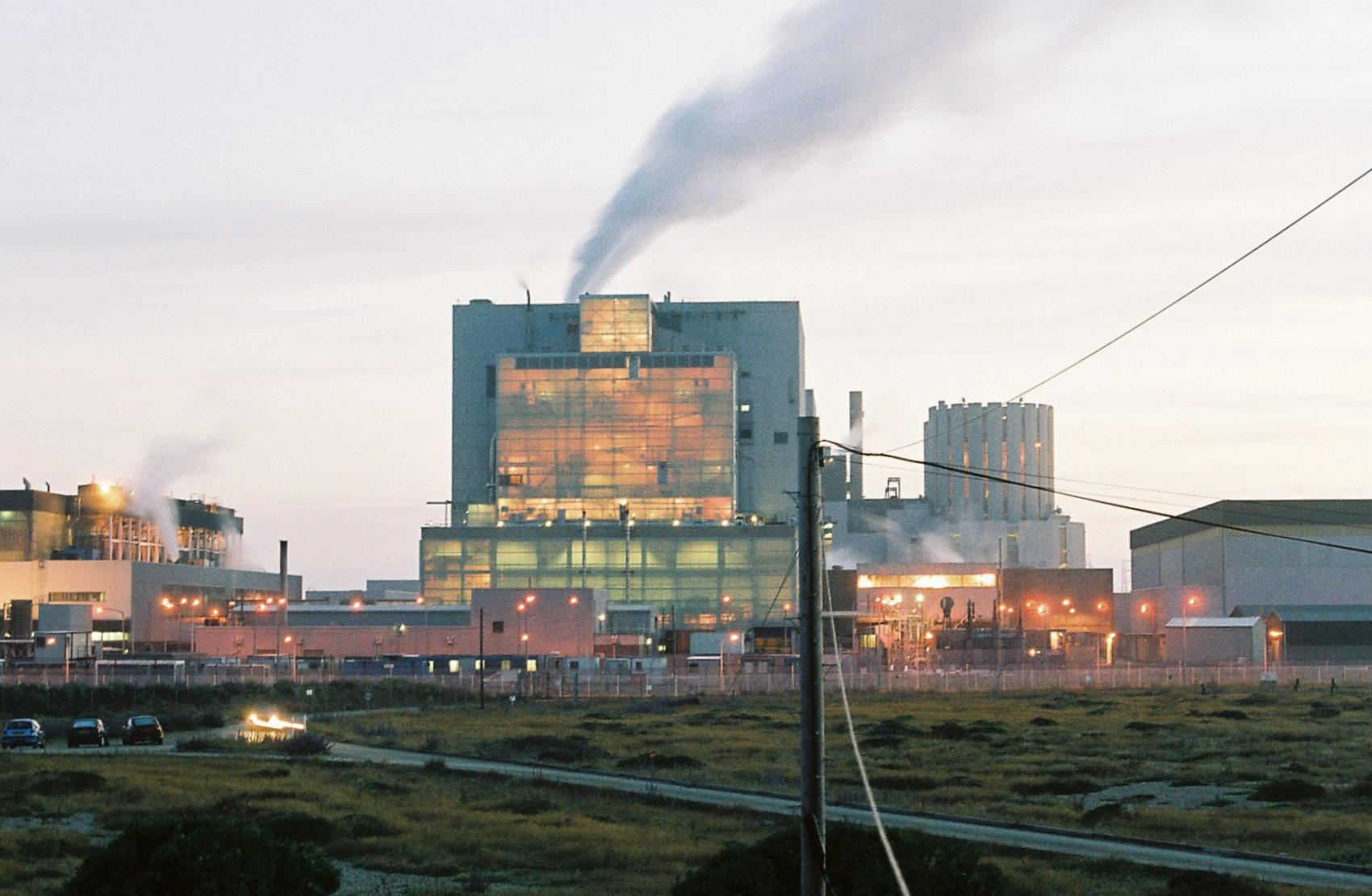
Dungeness uses Parsons steam turbines

The company was founded in 1889 by the engineer and inventor Charles Algernon Parsons. Upon establishment, its primary purpose was to develop and produce steam turbines, which he had innovated five years prior, as well as turbo generators that could withstand the high speeds of the turbine. When used in combination with an electrical generator, Parsons's steam turbine made cheap and plentiful electricity possible; additionally, it revolutionised marine transport and naval warfare alike. Amongst other early uses of its apparatus was the Newcastle and District Electric Lighting Company, which opened Forth Banks Power Station in 1890, the first power station in the world to generate electricity using turbo generators.

Throughout the 1890s, the company implemented a series of rapid incremental improvements. In 1896, Parsons produced their first geared steam turbogenerator. Four years later, the company supplied its first megawatt turbine for a generating plant at Elberfeld in the German Empire.

In 1896, the American industrialist and engineer George Westinghouse secured a licence from Parsons along with a 120 kW turbogenerator set for reference, which became the first such unit to produce electricity commercially in North America. However, Westinghouse and Parsons ended their business relationship only a few years later after the former breached the terms of their licence by supplying turbogenerator sets to UK-based customers. In 1908, the London Underground opted to replace its unsatisfactory Westinghouse-produced tubogenerators with eight 10 MW sets from Parsons at Lots Road Power Station; the facility would be exclusively powered using Parsons-built units until its closure in 2002.

At the beginning of the 20th century, the company was producing up to 50 turbines per year at its factory in Heaton in Newcastle upon Tyne. During the 1900s, Parsons introduced several innovations, including new blade mounting techniques and nozzle governing. Furthermore, by this point, Parsons had adopted standardised designs for elements of both its land and maritime turbines. By 1904, the increasingly-capable steam turbine had rendered the reciprocating steam engine effectively obsolete for electricity generation in Britain. In 1912, Parsons produced a geared cross-compound 4.5 MW turbogenerator for Pilkingtons; this was the company's first unit with 'end-tightened' blades, a feature that would be widely used into the 1970s.

Charles Algernon Parsons' son, Algernon George "Tommy" Parsons, joined the company as a director. However, when he was called up for military service in the First World War, Algernon was replaced by his sister, Rachel Mary Parsons, who was one of the first women to study engineering at University of Cambridge. During the First World War, the Parsons’ Works on Shields Road employed a large number of women on the factory floor. Following her brother's death during the conflict, Rachel Parsons did not resume her role as a director of the Heaton Works.

Between 1894 and 1923, Parsons patented and manufactured novel searchlight mirrors. Claude Gibb joined the company as a fitter in the 1920s, he became both its chairman and managing director by the 1940s.

Throughout the Second World War, the company's activities supported Britain's war effort. R&D work proceeded throughout the conflict, resulting in the company producing Britain’s first industrial gas turbine in 1945.

Gibb foresaw a huge demand for both turbines and generators during the post-war years, not only to replace damaged plant but to accommodate a boom in electrical demand. Accordingly, large parts of the company's works at Heaton, Walkergate and Longbenton Works were rebuilt and expanded to increase capacity three fold. Furthermore, to facilitate the large increases in turbine/generator size anticipated, numerous new buildings were constructed and apparatus purchased across the company starting in 1947; as part of these works, the original 1889 workshop was demolished in 1951 and replaced with a six-storey office block. Accordingly, the number of employees increased from 2,980 in 1939 to approximately 10,000 by 1960.

In 1946, following talks with both the Ministry of Supply and the Atomic Energy Research Establishment, Parsons became involved in the nescient nuclear power sector. Initial orders for the nuclear sector comprised large magnets for cyclotrons and other nuclear research apparatus. Parsons designed and manufactured the majority on the steam plant for Calder Hall, the first commercial nuclear power station in the world. Various other nuclear power stations using Parsons steam turbines were commissioned in the 1950s, 1960s and 1970s, including Bradwell, Dungeness, Heysham 2 and Oldbury in England and Chapelcross and Hunterston in Scotland. To bolster its technological advantage in both conventional and nuclear plant, Parsons established multiple new research and development facilities. Between 1946 and 1958, Parsons turbogenerators increased from 50 MW to 550 MW.

In April 1959, the Nuclear Research Centre was established at Heaton to support the development of nuclear power stations in Britain. It soon expanded its operations to masers, magnetoplasmadynamics, superconductivity and solid-state physics, and following the Cuban Missile Crisis it was transformed in December 1962 into a contract research organization called the International Research and Development Company Ltd. Lord Fleck was appointed as chairman and Monty Finniston (the initiator of IRDC) as the managing director. Based at a six-acre site within two miles of Newcastle's city centre, it served the needs of industry and government agencies at home and abroad.

The company's heyday was in the 1960s, when the Heaton plant alone employed more than 7,000 people. That same decade, Parsons took over the turbine and generator factories in Erith and Witton of the General Electric Company.

The company merged with A. Reyrolle & Company to form Reyrolle Parsons in 1968. Shortly afterwards, £11 million was invested into refurbishing the Heaton facility into a world-leading centre for turbine production. During the 1970s, a combination of inflation and climbing operating costs led to job losses at the firm; from a peak of 11,800 employees in 1968, the workforce declined to 8,500 in 1971, and then 6,500 in 1975.

Following the appointment of James Woodeson as chairman in 1974, Reyrolle Parsons merged with Clarke Chapman to form Northern Engineering Industries in 1977. Northern Engineering Industries was acquired by Rolls-Royce in 1989, after which it was rebranded as Rolls-Royce Industrial Power Group.

In 1997, the German engineering company Siemens acquired the business from Rolls-Royce in exchange for £30 million, after which it was integrated into Siemens Energy. The Heaton Works site was renamed as the CA Parsons Works in honour of its founder. In the 2000s, the operations at the Heaton works were severely cut to focus mainly on the servicing side of the business, concentrating manufacturing operations at the company's factories in Mülheim and Budapest.

== Preserved turbines ==
Parsons turbines are on display in several museums in the UK, and across the world. These include the Discovery Museum in Newcastle, the Science Museum in London, and the Electric Power and Historical Museum, in Yokohama, Japan.

== See also ==
- Parsons Marine Steam Turbine Company
- Grubb Parsons
- Mechanical Engineering Heritage (Japan) No. 4; Parsons Steam Turbine, made in 1908, upon technical licensed to Mitsubishi-Japan in 1904.
