= Clothier =

Clothier may refer to:

== Professions ==
- Someone involved in the making and marketing of cloth, see cloth production
- Tailor, the most common modern usage
- Cloth merchant
- Clothing store

== Surname ==
- Cecil Clothier (1919–2010), English judge
- Hannah Hallowell Clothier (1872-1958), American clubwoman, feminist, and pacifist
- Henry William Clothier (1872–1938), British electrical engineer and inventor
- Hurshul Clothier (1922–2006), American western swing band musician and bandleader
- Robert Clothier (1921–1999), Canadian stage and television actor
- Robert Clothier (politician) (1877–1962), Australian senator
- Robert Clarkson Clothier (1885–1970), president of Rutgers University 1932–1951 and president of the New Jersey Constitutional Convention of 1947
- William Clothier (tennis) (1881–1962), American tennis player
- William Clothier (cinematographer) (1903–1996), American film director of photography

== See also ==
- Clothier, West Virginia, an unincorporated community
- Strawbridge & Clothier, American department store, subsequently known as Strawbridge's
