= Henry William Clothier =

British electrical engineer and inventor

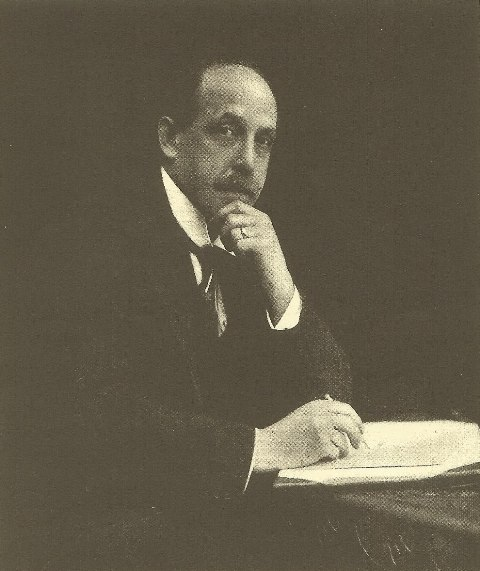
Henry William Clothier

Henry William Clothier (3 April 1872 – 11 March 1938) was a British electrical engineer and inventor.

Clothier was born in London, England and served his apprenticeship with Messrs J. & H. Gwynne of Hammersmith. After leaving Gwynnes Limited he joined Dr Sebastian Ziani de Ferranti and Mr C P Sparks, first in London, and then in Hollinwood. It was with Ferranti that he first became interested in switchgear, an interest that was to develop into his life’s work.

In 1905 Clothier went to Tyneside to work with Charles Hesterman Merz and Bernard Price and joined Alphonse Reyrolle at A. Reyrolle & Company in 1906, and remained employed with them for the rest of his life. In Tyneside he began an investigation of protective gear for electricity generation, transmission, and distribution at the instigation of Charles Merz and Bernard Price. While thus engaged his attention was directed to improvement of high-voltage switchgear. At the time, switchgear was prone to catching fire, making switchrooms a hazardous place to work. It was largely due to Clothier's work and initiative that both the Merz-Price protective-gear and metal-clad switchgear, which controlled arcing on open-type electric switchboards, became both technically and commercially feasible.

One of the earliest, and probably most significant innovations, was the introduction in the early days of the century of Clothier's design of metal-clad draw-out switchgear. This new concept, which was to form the blueprint for the whole of the switchgear industry, was quickly accepted by the local supply authority and, after proving itself in service, was soon adopted by other users.

In those early days, the electrical manufacturers of England held exhibitions of their products at Olympia. The highest voltage available was 20,000 volts; 11,000 volts was then a high and awe-inspiring potential. There were a number of high-voltage switch-panels on show, with white porcelain insulators and red, white and blue painted bus-bars; and their manufactures glories at hanging notices on these panels "20,000 volts – DANGER". But Clothier, with his protective metal-clad switchgear in place, hung up on his panel "20,000 volts – NO DANGER".

As technology improved and the maximum voltage rose to 132,000, Clothier's inventions were still able to eliminate much of the danger in the general development of electricity supply

During 1917 A. Reyrolle & Co. developed the M-type switchgear, the first super-power metal clad switchgear for generating stations. Those that worked closely with him were impressed by Clothier's ability to convert a germ of an idea into freehand sketch design which could readily be made into a working drawing. His colleagues can confirm that by the aid of these sketches it was often only a question of hours between the first conception of the idea and the completion of the manufactured article.

After Alphonse Reyrolle died in 1919, Clothier was appointed to the board. He was credited with steering the company through the depression of the 1920s and into the 1930s. A compilation of his papers was published in 1932 as Switchgear Stages and soon became an oft-cited reference work for many switchgear designers. He retired from Reyrolle in April 1937.

Socially and communally he always took an active interest in the life of the district. He was at one time a member of the congregation of St. Peters. His energy was unbounded and his enthusiasm for doing good to others extended far beyond his professional life.

In 1938, while on an extensive 6-month private and business tour of the region, Henry, aged 66, died in Auckland, New Zealand on 11 March. An operation performed in February, at first with some appearance of success, later followed complications which terminated fatally.

The Clothier Electrical Testing Laboratories in Hebburn, (Northumberland, England) opened in 1970, are named after him in recognition of his service to Reyrolle.
