= Reyrolle Parsons =

Reyrolle Parsons was an engineering company, which during the 1970s, was the largest private employer on Tyneside. It was based in Newcastle upon Tyne.

== History ==
The company was formed by the merger of A. Reyrolle & Company and C. A. Parsons and Company in 1968. The first chairman was Edward Judge, who also served as President of the British Electrical Allied Manufacturers Association between 1960 and 1971. Following the appointment of James Woodeson as chairman in 1974, Reyrolle Parsons merged with Clarke Chapman to form Northern Engineering Industries plc in 1977.
