= A. Reyrolle & Company =

Former British engineering firm based in Hebburn, Tyne and Wear

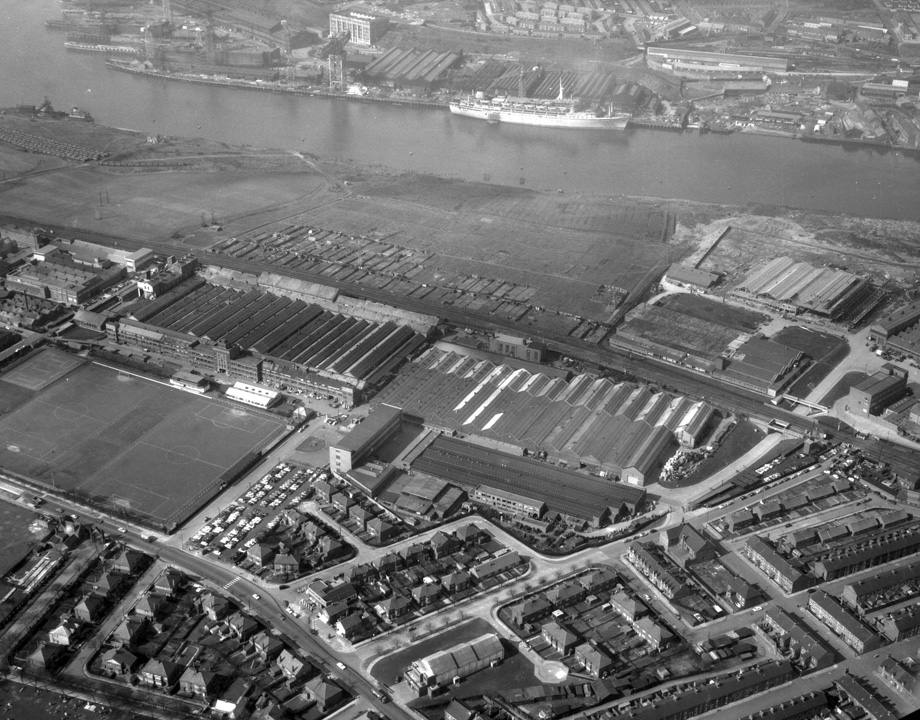
- Aerial view of Reyrolle factory, Hebburn, 1962
- Type: Public
- Industry: Engineering
- Founded: 1886
- Defunct: 1998
- Fate: Acquired
- Successor: Siemens
- Headquarters: Hebburn, UK
- Products: Switchgear

A. Reyrolle & Company was a British engineering firm based in Hebburn, Tyne and Wear in the North East of England. For many years the company was one of the largest employers on Tyneside.

== History ==
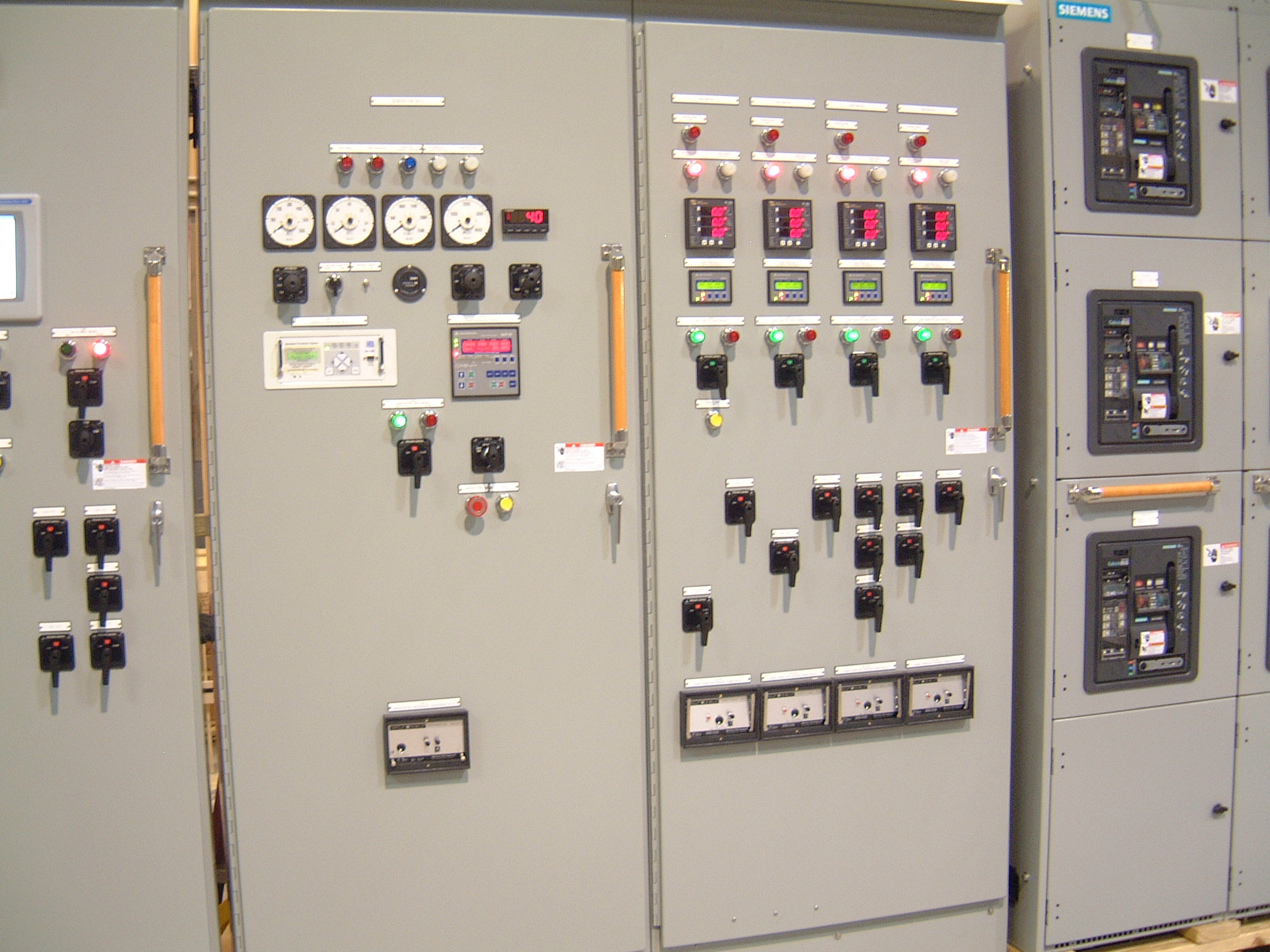
Example of typical Siemens switchgear

The company was founded by Alphonse Reyrolle, at Fitzroy Square in London in 1886. It moved to Hebburn on Tyneside in 1901. At its peak it manufactured switchgear for power stations worldwide and employed 12,000 people.

The company had its own football team, which evolved into Hebburn Town F.C.

The company merged with C. A. Parsons and Company to form Reyrolle Parsons in 1968.

Following the appointment of James Woodeson as chairman in 1974, Reyrolle Parsons merged with Clarke Chapman to form Northern Engineering Industries plc in 1977. Northern Engineering Industries was acquired by Rolls-Royce plc in 1989.

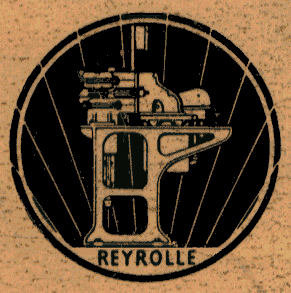
Scan of and early Reyrolle logo showing and early open frame switchgear design

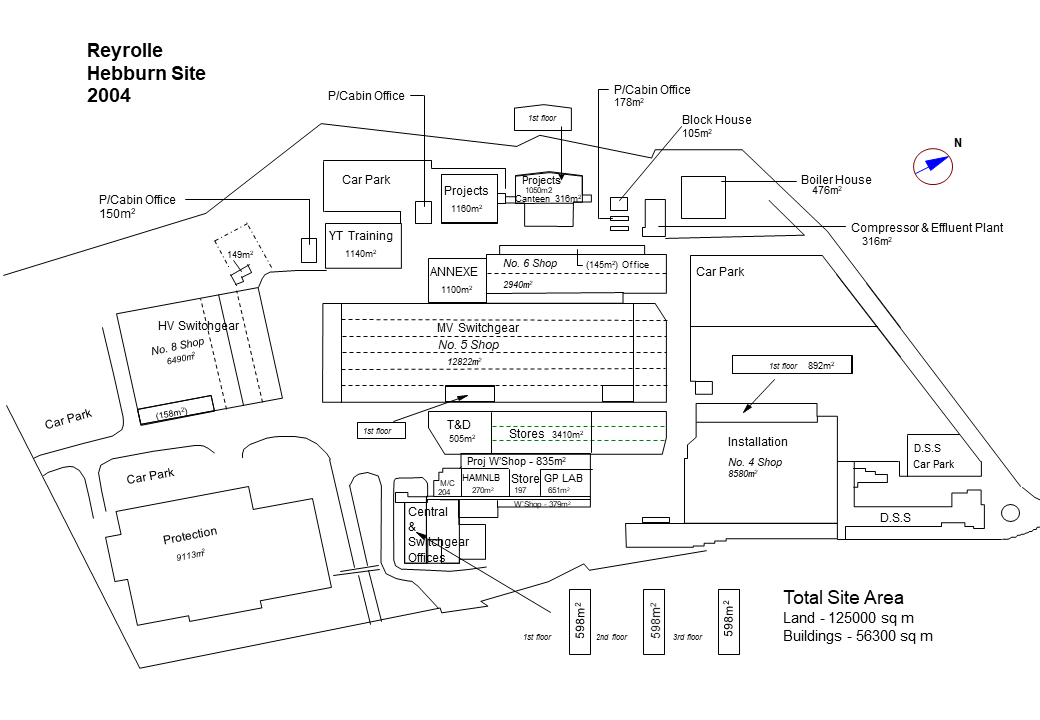
Reyrolle Hebburn site layout between 1990 and 2004. Most of the site is now a housing estate. Only the Protection business of the original Hebburn site remains owned by Siemens.

The business was acquired in 1998 by VA Technologie AG, which was acquired by the industrial conglomerate Siemens in 2005, reuniting the company with Parsons under the new owners. Siemens supported the Reyrolle installed base on a global basis, with Operations and Protection based at the remaining section of the original Reyrolle Works in Hebburn, although this constitutes only around 10 percent of the original site. The Major Projects division is based at a modern office building on the nearby Monkton Business Park.

The New Zealand division, Reyrolle Pacific, was sold by Siemens AG/VA Tech to a private individual in New Zealand. This included the switchgear factory in Petone, with a staff of about 100. Reyrolle Pacific Switchgear became RPS Switchgear and manufactures retrofit breakers for the original LMT switchgear, and vacuum breakers and panels for 11 kV substations.
