= John Thompson (company) =

- Type: Public
- Industry: Engineering
- Founded: 1820
- Defunct: 2004
- Fate: Acquired
- Successor: Clarke Chapman
- Headquarters: Wolverhampton, UK
- Products: Nuclear engineering Boilers; Pressure vessels

John Thompson Limited was a major engineering business based in Wolverhampton, in its latter years offering products for the nuclear engineering industry.

== History ==
The company was founded by William Thompson, in or around 1820, in Wolverhampton, as a general engineering business. In 1850, the business passed to William's brother, Stephen, and in 1860, it passed to William's son, John. Within ten years it was concentrating on manufacturing boilers.

By 1914, the company had expanded into motor pressings. During World War I it made cowlings for Sopwith aircraft and, in World War II, it made airscrews for Spitfire and Hurricane aircraft.

In the 1950s, as part of a consortium with AEI, the company was awarded a contract to supply boilers and reactor pressure vessels for the Berkeley nuclear power station.

In 1970, the business was acquired by Clarke Chapman and, in 2004, the Ettingshall Works was closed.
