= William Clarke (industrialist) =

British industrialist

William Clarke (1831–1890) was a British industrialist. He is best known as the co-founder of Clarke Chapman in Gateshead, once one of the largest employers on Tyneside.

Educated locally, Clarke undertook his apprenticeship with Longbridge's Iron Works in Bedlington and at Armstrong, Mitchell & Co. in Newcastle upon Tyne. In 1864, he set up a small engineering business on the South Shore in the same area as Hawks and Abbots iron foundries. Within a year, he had taken a partner, Abel Chapman and later the two were joined by Charles Parsons to create Clarke Chapman.

The firm relocated to St James' Road and within 20 years, was world-famous.

William Clarke played an active part in the affairs of Gateshead and was a JP and a Council member for some years as well as an organiser for the local Volunteer Corps, treasurer of the Children's Hospital and a supporter of the Northern Counties Institute for the Deaf. Clarke was a staunch Methodist and the first Treasurer of the 'New Durham Road Wesleyan Mission Committee' in 1885. He also introduced a number of reading rooms and science classes for Gateshead people. It was said of William that he seldom 'strayed from the banks of the Tyne'. He died unexpectedly at the age of 59.

== See also ==
- Sheriff Hill
