= Clarke Chapman =

British engineering firm

- Type: Private
- Industry: Engineering
- Founded: 1864
- Founder: William Clarke
- Headquarters: Gateshead, Tyne and Wear, North East, England, UK
- Parent: Langley Holdings
- Website: www.clarkechapman.co.uk

Clarke Chapman is a British engineering firm based in Gateshead that was formerly listed on the London Stock Exchange. At its height, the company was one of the largest manufacturers of cranes and other mechanical handling equipment in the world, as well as the primary supplier of auxiliary equipment to the British shipbuilding industry.

Founded in 1864 by William Clarke, the company started production of its first steam-powered winch four years later. In 1874, having rebranded as Clarke, Watson and Gurney, the company relocated to Victoria Works and started producing boilers during the following year. In 1883, partner Charles Algernon Parsons oversaw the company's electrical department; a patent for Parsons' steam turbine was granted and the company's first turbogenerator was produced one year later. It was producing a range of electrical and auxiliary machinery, mining plant, water tube boilers, and pumps by 1907, making the firm a key supplier to shipbuilders. In 1949, James Woodeson became chairman of the company; he oversaw numerous acquisitions during the 1960s and early 1970s, including of Sir William Arrol & Co., John Thompson, and parts of International Combustion. In 1977, Clarke Chapman merged with Reyrolle Parsons to form Northern Engineering Industries, which was purchased by Rolls-Royce plc in 1989 and sold to Langley Holdings Limited in 2000.

== History ==
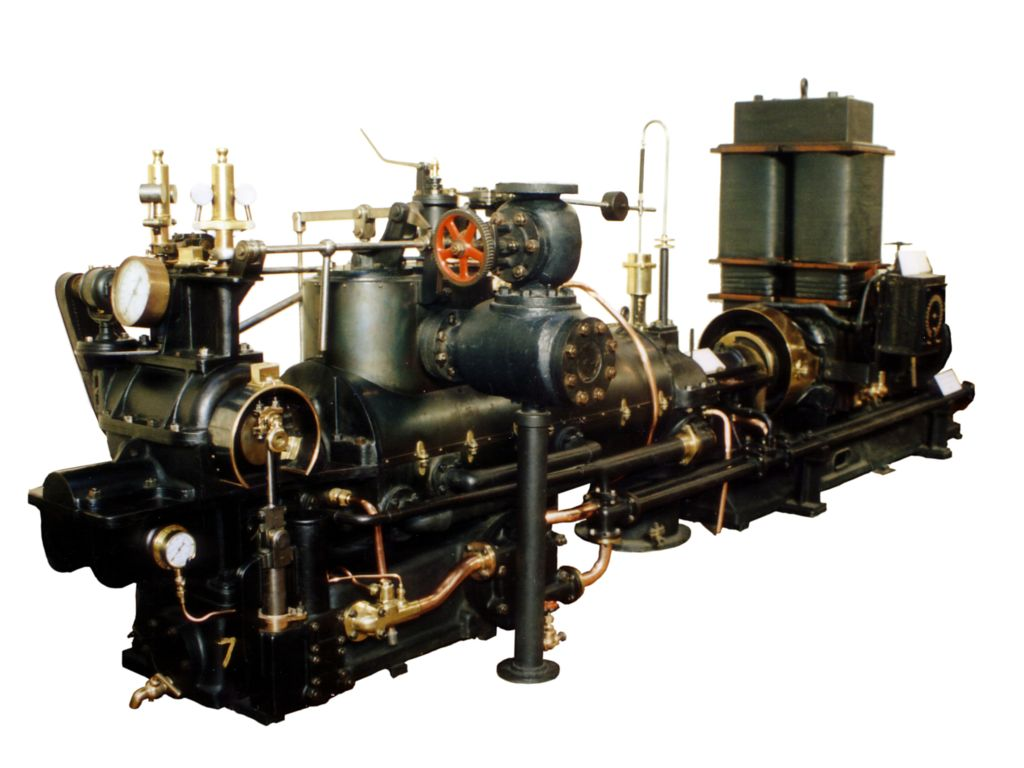
A steam turbine, generator & switchboard set, made by Clarke, Chapman, Parsons & Co. It is now in the collection of Thinktank, Birmingham Science Museum.

The company was established in 1864 in Gateshead by the industrialist William Clarke. The company initially focused on the production of winches; it started production of its first steam-powered winch in 1868. In 1870, two partners joined the firm, Joseph Watson and Joseph Gurney, after which the company was renamed Clarke, Watson and Gurney. Four years later, the firm relocated to Victoria Works and Abel Chapman became involved in its operation. Production of boilers commenced in 1875. Joseph Gurney retired from the firm in 1882.

The firm subsequently formed a partnership with John Furneaux and Charles Algernon Parsons, and became known as Clarke, Chapman, Parsons, and Company. In 1883, Parsons took charge of the reorganised electrical department and the development of a high speed generator. One year later, a patent was granted for Parsons steam turbine; an electric winch and the first Parsons turbogenerator were also produced that same year. A dedicated electrical installation department was setup in 1886. In 1889, Parsons left the firm to establish C. A. Parsons and Company.

By 1907, the firm manufactured an extensive range of ship's auxiliary machinery, mining plant, water tube boilers, and pumps. Prior to the outbreak of the First World War, Clarke Chapman had become the primary supplier of auxiliary equipment to the British shipbuilding industry.

James Woodeson became chairman in 1949 and remained in that role for the next 28 years. During Woodeson's tenure, the company became a member of the Nuclear Power Group.

In 1969, Clarke Chapman acquired the bridge-building specialist Sir William Arrol & Co. with support from the Industrial Reorganisation Corporation. One year later, Clarke Chapman acquired the Wolverhampton-based boiler manufacturer John Thompson, after which the company was rebranded as Clarke Chapman - John Thompson Limited. In 1974, Clarke Chapman acquired the UK interests of International Combustion, a diverse group of heavy engineering businesses.

The company merged with Reyrolle Parsons to form Northern Engineering Industries plc in 1977. Northern Engineering Industries was acquired by Rolls-Royce plc in 1989.

== Recent operations ==
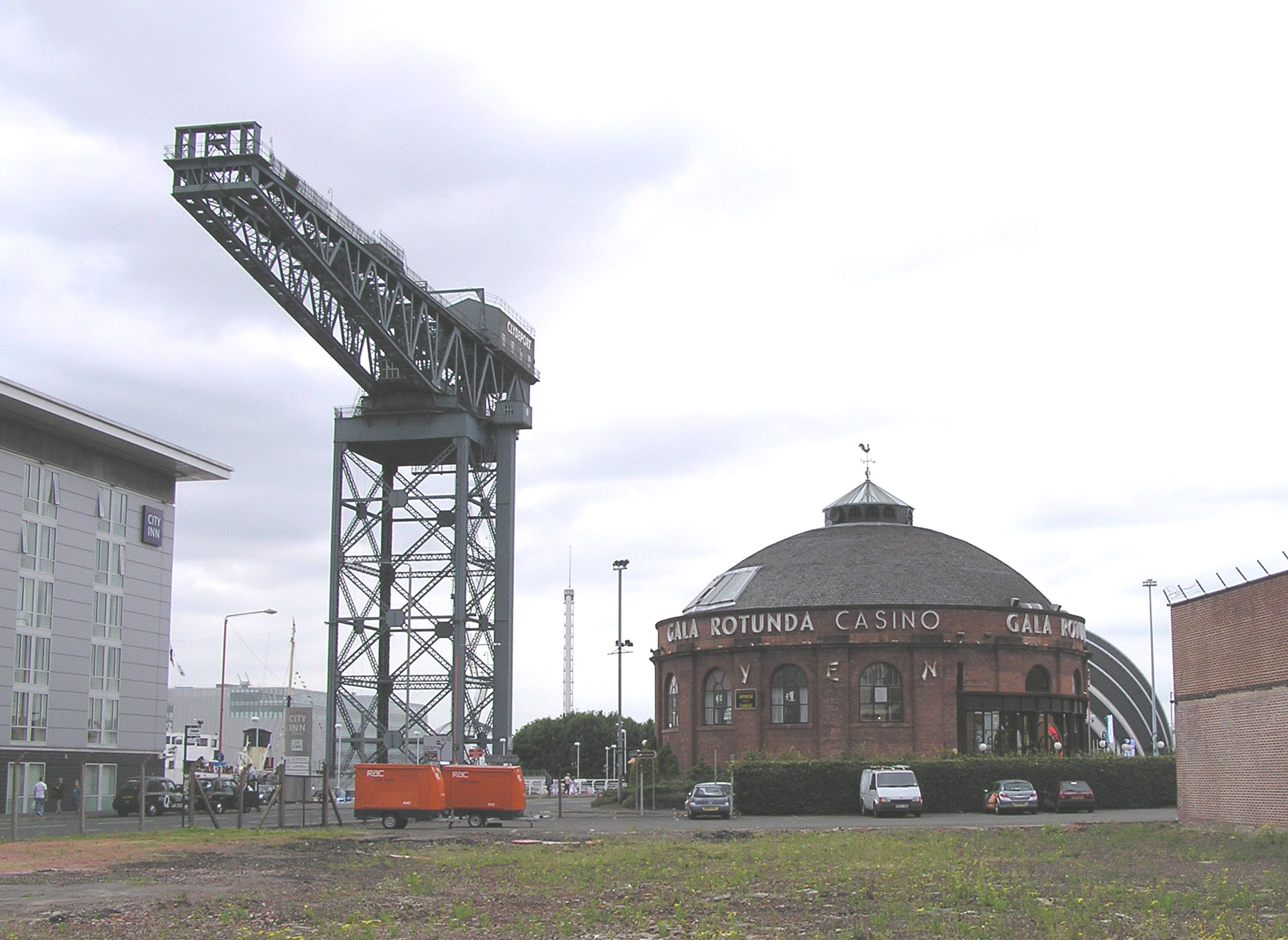
The Finnieston Crane in Glasgow built by Cowans Sheldon

In December 2000, the Nottinghamshire-based engineering and construction firm Langley Holdings Limited acquired the majority of business from Rolls-Royce, although the Clarke Chapman marine business was retained.

Various post-Cold War ships have had use of Clarke Chapman mechanical handling equipment, such as the Wave-class fast fleet tankers operated by the Royal Fleet Auxiliary (RFA).

The company trades under the names of Clarke Chapman (facilities management) Cowans Sheldon (railway cranes), RB Cranes (construction cranes), Stothert & Pitt (port cranes) and Wellman Booth (steel plant cranes).

Since 2010, Cowans Sheldon has maintained and operated the rail delivery fleet, switches and crossings fleet and cable drum fleet for Network Rail and undertaken rail replacement operations. In 2026, Clarke Chapman expanded its presence in the rail sector via the acquisition of the locomotive builder Clayton Equipment Company.

== See also ==
- C. A. Parsons and Company
- A. Reyrolle & Company
