= Alphonse Reyrolle =

Alphonse Constant Reyrolle (1864–1919) was a French electrical engineer and businessman. He was the founder of A. Reyrolle & Company in Hebburn, Tyne and Wear in the North East of England. For many years the company was one of the largest employers on Tyneside.

== Career ==
Reyrolle was born the son of Martial und Marie Faye Reyrolle in Juillac, Corrèze in France. He emigrated to England and secured employment working for a French engineer, Jean Lege, at Farringdon Street in London in 1883. He established his own business at Fitzroy Square in London to produce scientific instruments in 1886. After he moved the business to Hebburn on Tyneside in 1901, it went on to become one of the largest employers on Tyneside, manufacturing switchgear for power stations worldwide. He died at his home in Newcastle upon Tyne on 27 February 1919.
