= Low Fell =

Suburb of Gateshead, England

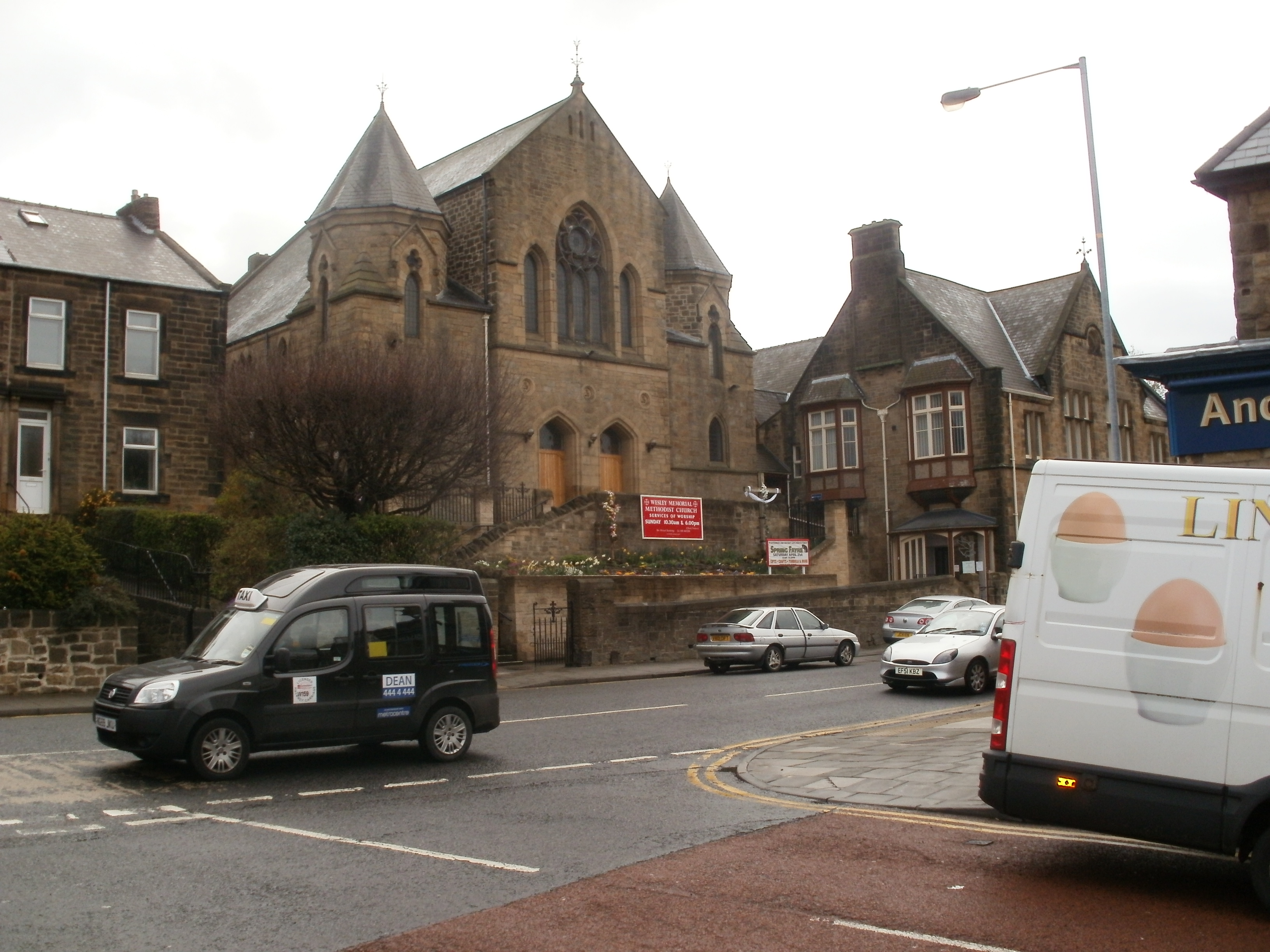
- Wesley Memorial Church, Low Fell

- Location within Tyne and Wear
- Population: 8,636 (2011, Gateshead ward)
- OS grid reference: NZ2559
- Metropolitan borough: Gateshead
- Metropolitan county: Tyne and Wear
- Region: North East
- Country: England
- Sovereign state: United Kingdom
- Post town: GATESHEAD
- Postcode district: NE9
- Dialling code: 0191
- Police: Northumbria
- Fire: Tyne and Wear
- Ambulance: North East
- UK Parliament: Gateshead Central and Whickham

Low Fell is a suburb of Gateshead situated in the Metropolitan Borough of Gateshead in Tyne and Wear, England. Built predominantly on sandstone, grindstone and clay, it is bordered by Sheriff Hill/Deckham to the east, Saltwell/Bensham to the west, Harlow Green to the south and Shipcote to the north. Low Fell is 3 miles (4.8 kilometres) south of Gateshead, 3 miles (4.8 kilometres) south of Newcastle upon Tyne and 12 miles (19 kilometres) north of Durham.

The main road into Low Fell is the A167. According to the 2001 UK census, Low Fell had a population of 8,643, falling marginally to 8,636 at the 2011 census. For centuries little more than part of a windswept, barren and treacherous heath, the settlement at Low Fell was initially established by a moderate influx of tinkers and miners in the 18th century. Gateshead Fell was initially incorporated into the Municipal Borough of Gateshead in 1835 and then the County Borough of Gateshead in 1889. More recently, it was formally incorporated into the newly formed Metropolitan Borough of Gateshead by the Local Government Act 1972 which took effect on 1 April 1974.

== History ==
=== Gateshead Fell ===
Prior to 1809, Low Fell was part of Gateshead Fell; itself a constituent part of the ancient County of Durham. Once described as a "windswept, barren and treacherous heath", it took its name from nearby Gateshead and the fact that the area was "a fell or common contigious to it". That portion of Gateshead Fell which would later become Low Fell was, in the 1640s, little more than boggy marsh and wetlands owned by the Bishop of Durham who simply divided the land into plots and rented them to the few tenants willing to pay for them. By the 18th century, the lower section of Gateshead Fell consisted broadly of sparsely populated farm and woodland, demarcated from the section of Gateshead Fell which was to become Sheriff Hill by a boundary formed by a mound of earth.

In 1771, the number of settlers on Gateshead Fell increased as a result of the 'Great Flood of 1771', during which the rivers Tyne, Wear and Tees all burst their banks, causing people to lose their homes. By this time, however, Gateshead Fell had become a place of considerable notoriety, both for the bleakness of the land and for the criminality undertaken upon it. When theologian John Wesley arrived in a blizzard in 1785, he found a "pathless waste of white" inhabited predominantly by tinkers, gypsies, pitmen and quarrymen.

In 1809 an inclosure act, the Gateshead Inclosure Act 1809 (49 Geo. 3. c. cxxxv), was obtained ordering the enclosure of Gateshead Fell.

=== 1809–present day ===
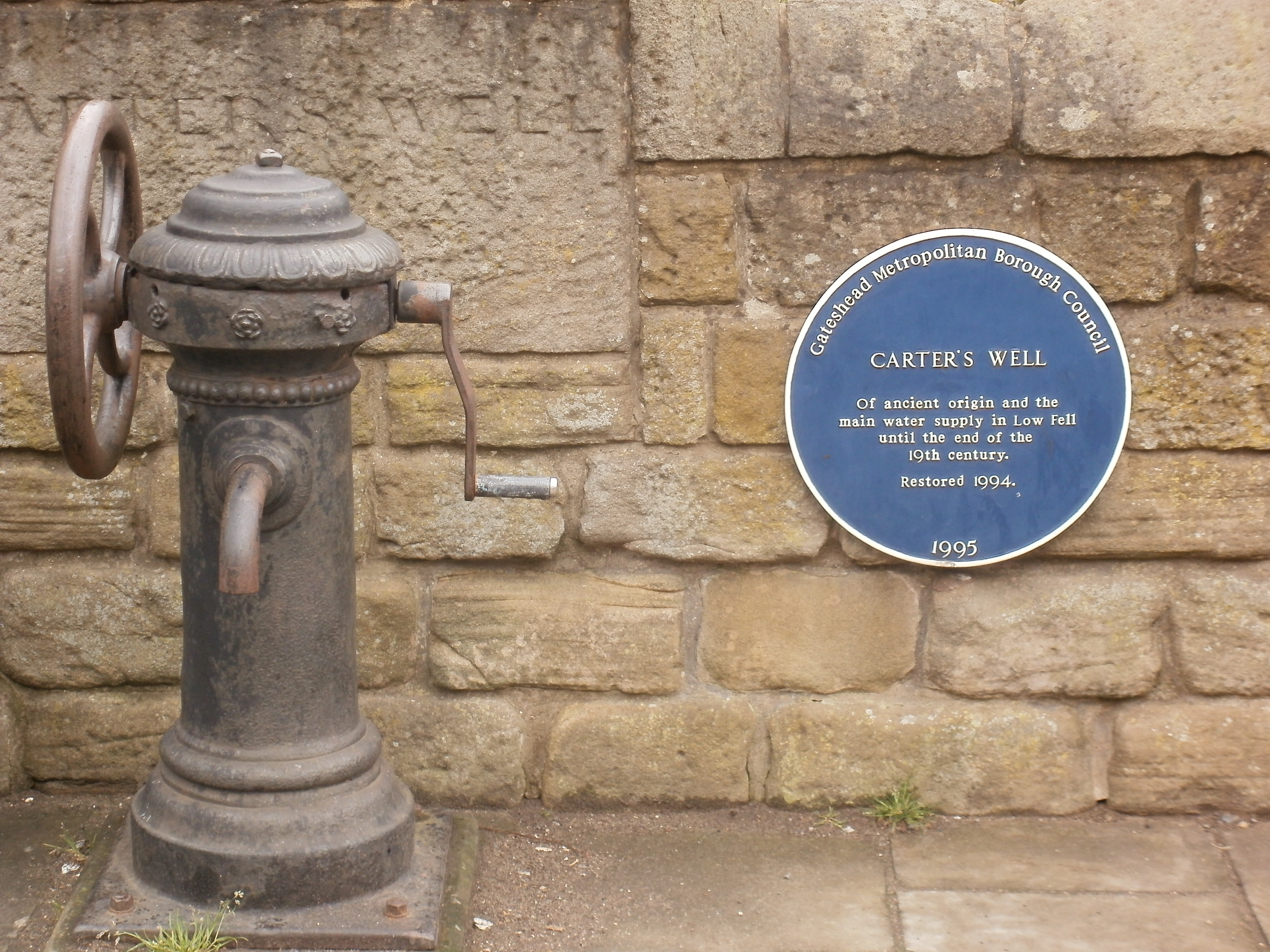
Carter's Well and its blue plaque

The Gateshead Inclosure Act 1809 separated Gateshead Fell into Wrekenton and Sheriff Hill (collectively High Fell) plus Low Fell. Commissioners were appointed to settle claims in land and to apportion Gateshead Fell accordingly. Plans were laid for the requisition and construction of wells (including Carter's Well; located on Durham Road and accompanied today by a commemorative Gateshead blue plaque), quarries, drains, roads, watering places and other essential requirements. Progress was slow, with the last allotment disputes not settled until 1822, but by the time of completion, Gateshead Fell was entirely enclosed and effectively consigned to history. The divisions of Gateshead Fell have remained more or less settled, so that the villages created by enclosure have survived, almost entirely intact, to the present day.

After enclosure, 'civilisation came to the Fell'. This began with the building of a new road. The only major road through Gateshead Fell was that which followed the same route of the ancient turnpike road which ran through what is now Sheriff Hill (today this is Old Durham Road/Sheriffs Highway). The turnpike road was very steep and was deemed rather unsatisfactory:

Why should coaches have to labour up the long hill from Newcastle to the top of Gateshead Fell, and then go down the steep descent to the Coach & Horses inn just before Birtley, while those coming from the south had to climb and descend the hills in reverse? There must be a new road with better gradients...

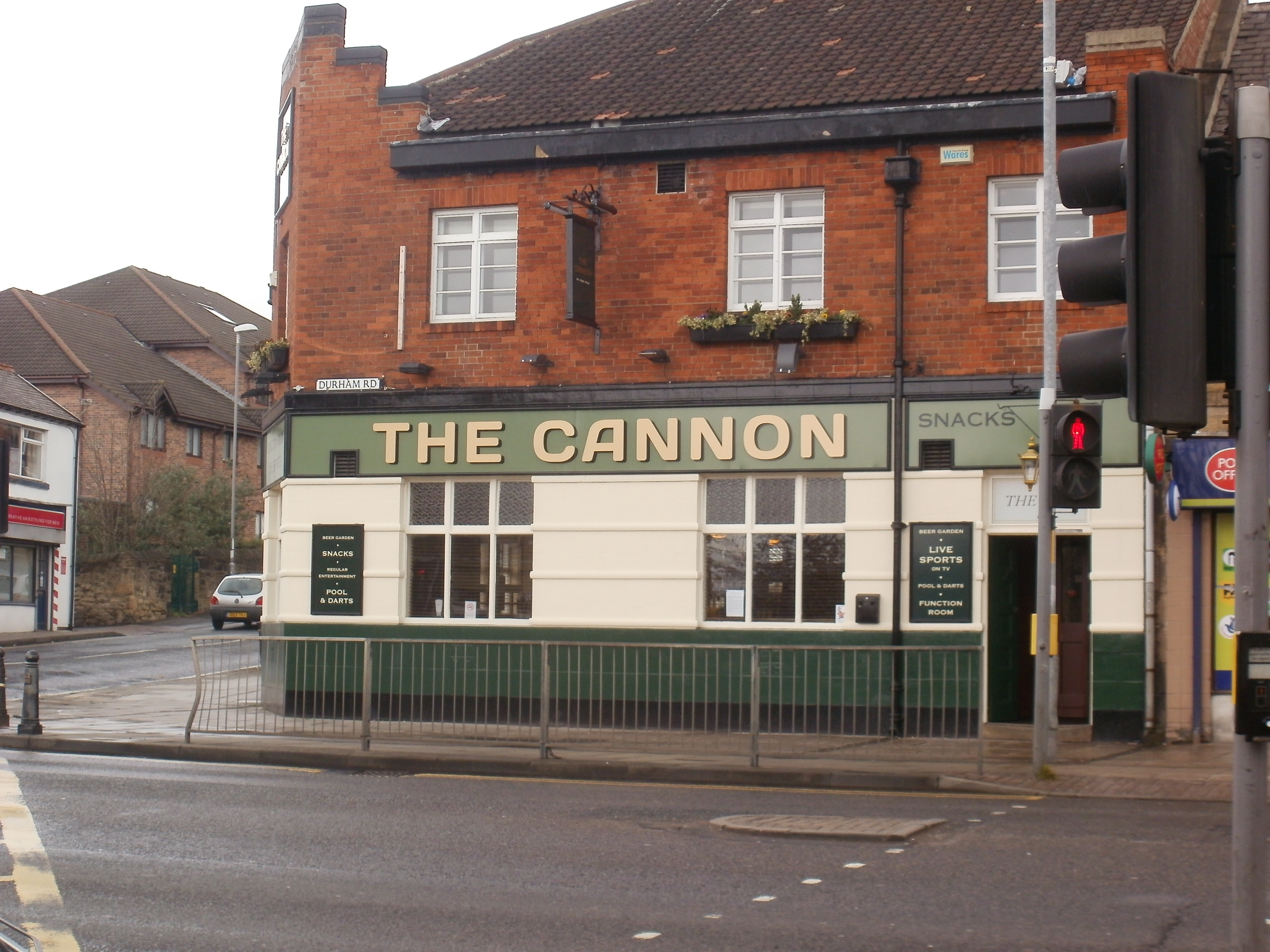
The Cannon Inn circa 2012. In the formative development of the settlement this pub was a major social focal point.

Until 1824 there was still about a mile of farmland between Gateshead and Low Fell, though the land was far less severe than that leading to Sheriff Hill and Wrekenton, so plans were drawn to build a new road through the farmland, Low Fell and towards Durham. Work began on this new road on 6 December 1824 and took some eighteen months to complete so that the first mail coach travelled on the new road, today known as Durham Road, on 17 June 1826. Thomas Wilson used to call this road "the road through the fields"; a description which was said to have suited the road well until at least the turn of the 20th century.

The opening of the new road saw people drawn to an area which now attracted considerable trade, travel and through–fare. Robert Clements, proprietor of the Old Cannon Inn at Sheriff Hill, quickly foresaw the likely detrimental effect that the new road would have on his business and opened the New Cannon Inn on the corner of Durham Road and Buck Lane (now Beaconsfield Road) in 1826– the same year that the Sheriff's March was re–routed from Sheriff Hill to the new road through Low Fell. Despite the cessation of the Sheriff's March in 1838, Clements' establishment became "the social centre of the growing village, where concerts, dinners and meetings of all kinds were held".

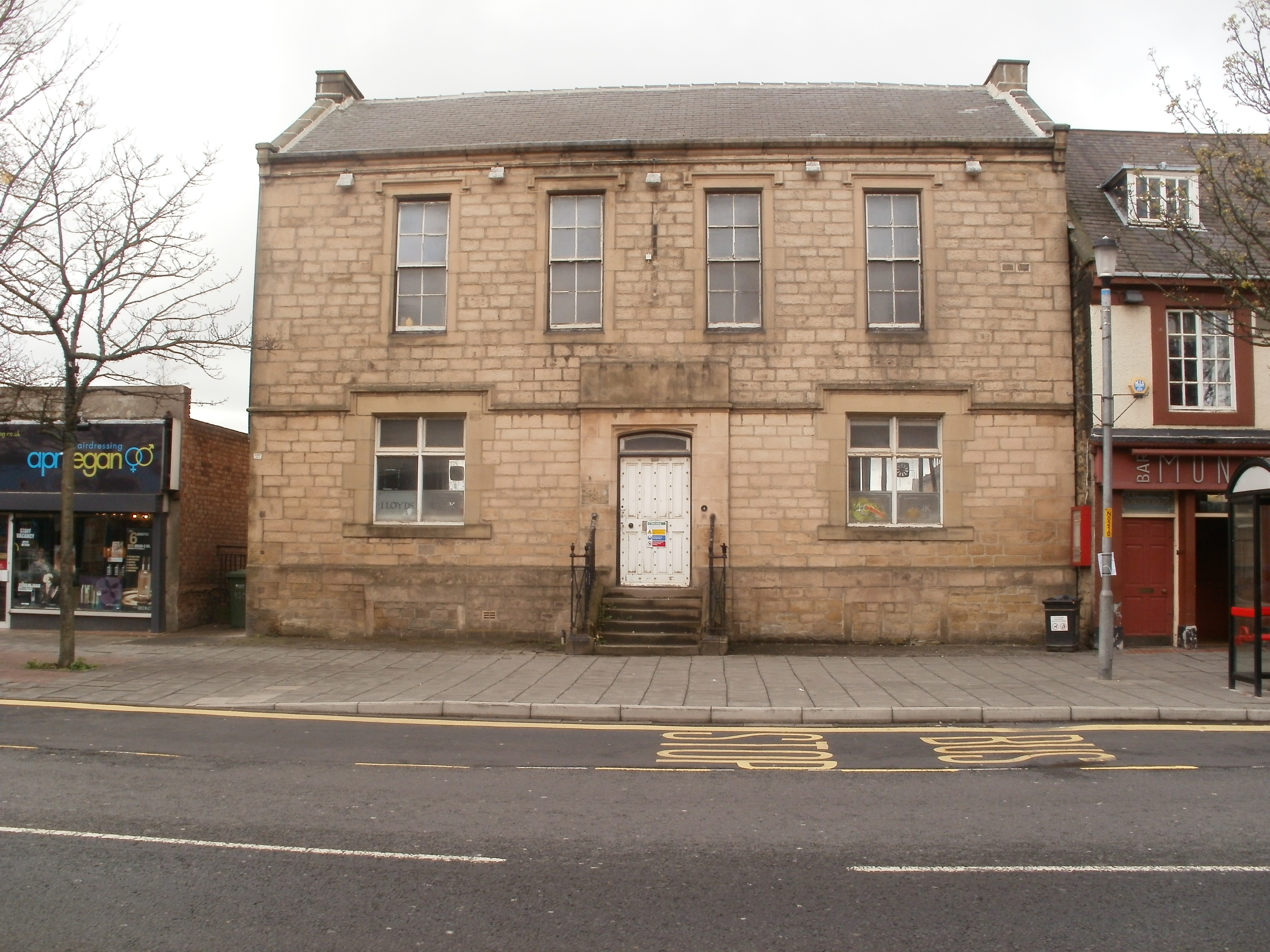
Wilsons's Literary Rooms, opened at Durham Road in 1841. It later became LLoyds bank, then lay unused for some time before its renovation in 2013 to an upmarket bar "The Bank".

New, adjoining roads gradually began to appear, such as Lamesley Road, which later became Kells Lane, and Low Fell Road, which became Beaconsfield Road and Belle Vue Bank. In January 1841, local poet Thomas Wilson bought land on Durham Road and opened literary rooms which were opened in November 1841. The upper section of the literary rooms was used as a school for local children until the opening of a new school on a site at Kells Lane in 1895. In the 1880s there was a decade of intensive building and the population of the village increased accordingly. The relative tranquility of the village, coupled with scenic views of surrounding hills and countryside, attracted rich industrialists from nearby Newcastle–upon–Tyne, seeking an alternative to the dirt and noise of industrial Newcastle and Gateshead. These individuals duly built and lived in mansion property in the area. One such property, Heathfield, was a mansion located on Durham Road which was built and owned by a wealthy chemical manufacturer who kept bears in his substantial adjoining grounds.

Through the early 20th century, the village continued to expand towards Gateshead, though even in the interwar–years "children could play marbles on Durham Road in perfect safety". However, by the turn of World War II in 1945, Gateshead itself has expanded so much that the urban sprawl had removed much of the scenic panorama which had delighted settlers in the suburb a century earlier. In spite of these developments:

By 1939, Low Fell had become the select suburb of Gateshead and had substantial and independent shopping facilities. All of the houses between Shipcote and the village were private and the owners added 'Low Fell' to their addresses, at times not even mentioning Gateshead, although, if we adhere to the original boundaries, they did not live in Low Fell at all".

The village changed little in either character or structure after the end of World War II, though in 1965 plans were drawn for the further development of Durham Road which drew criticism from residents. By 1974, when the Metropolitan Borough of Gateshead was formed, Low Fell had transformed from those early, village days and was by that time a bustling suburb with a considerable independent commercial hub attracting a high volume of vehicular traffic. That character is relatively unchanged today, but Low Fell remains one of the most attractive places to live in the North East of England, retaining a distinctive village feel and containing a thriving community of shops, restaurants, schools and churches.

== Governance ==
Gateshead Council, Low Fell– 2011 Local Elections
Candidate name	Political party	Number of votes	% of votes cast
Ron Beadle	Liberal Democrats	1,573	43.2%
John Young	Labour	1,325	36.4%
Paul Sterling	Conservative	369	10.1%
Mal Maclean	Independent	205	5.6%

Low Fell is a local council ward in the Metropolitan Borough of Gateshead. This ward is approximately 2 square kilometres (0.77 sq mi) in area and has a population of 8,643. The Low Fell ward is represented by three councillors. In April 2012, these were Ron Beadle, Frank Hindle and Susan Craig.

Low Fell is now part of the Westminster parliamentary constituency of Gateshead. It had previously formed part of the Gateshead East and Washington West constituency which was abolished by boundary changes prior to the 2010 UK General Election.

The present incumbent MP is Ian Mearns, who lives in nearby Saltwell, Gateshead, Tyne and Wear. Mearns, a member of the Labour party, replaced former incumbent Sharon Hodgson MP, who successfully campaigned for election in the newly formed constituency of Washington and Sunderland West. In the 2010 UK General Election, Mearns was elected with a majority of 12,549 votes over the second placed candidate, Frank Hindle. The swing from the Labour party to the Liberal Democrats was 3.9%.

Low Fell is part of one of the safest Labour parliamentary seats in the United Kingdom. Mearns' success in 2010 followed the return of Sharon Hodgson in the 2005 UK General Election after she had polled over 60% of the total votes cast whilst in 2001, Joyce Quin was returned to parliament with a majority of 53.3%.

== Geography and topography ==
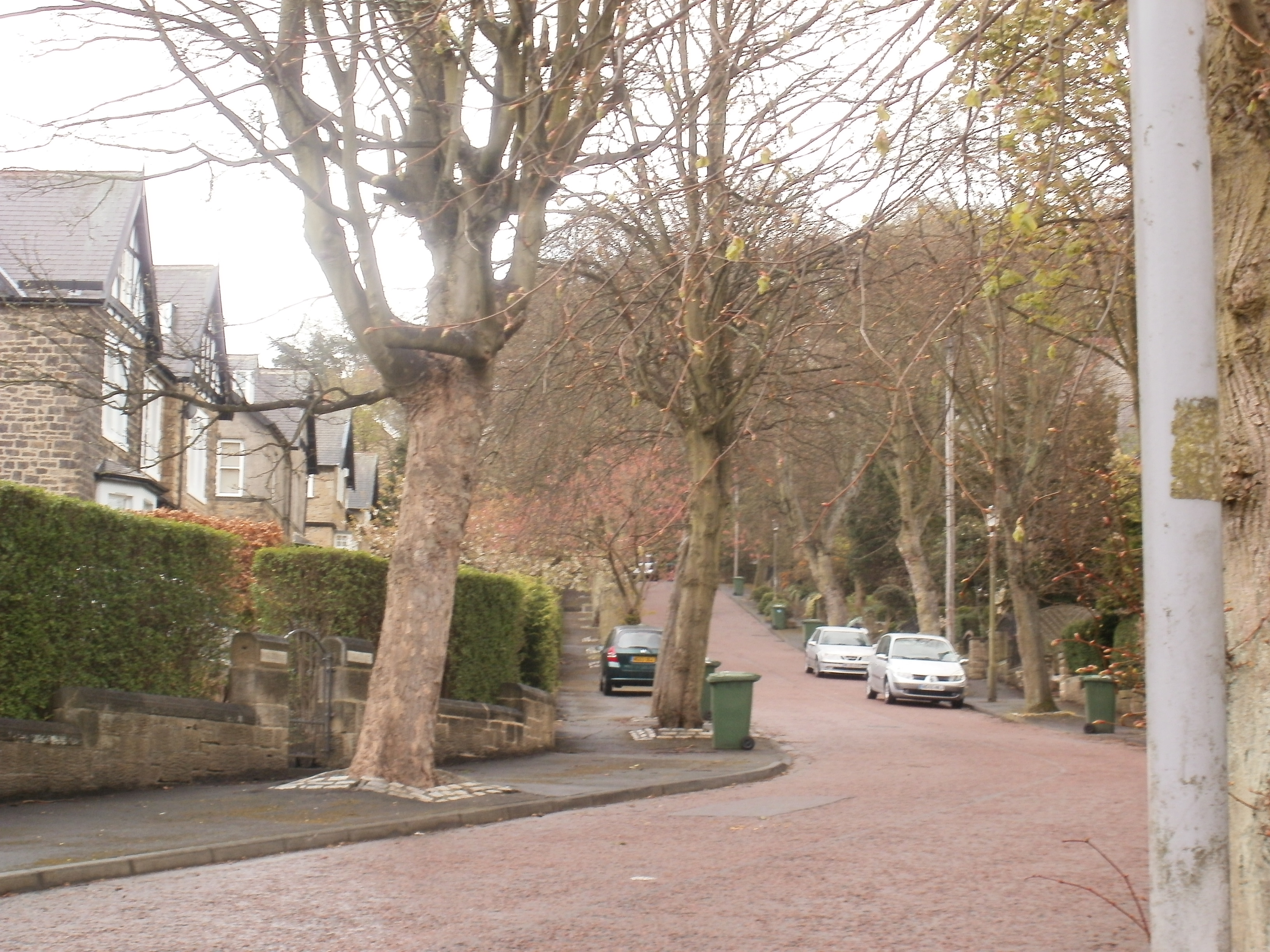
Kellfield Avenue– a typical street in Low Fell with large, semi–detached sandstone properties on a gentle slope towards Sheriff Hill

Low Fell, at a latitude of 54.93° N and a longitude of 1.60 ° W, lies on the eastern side of the Team Valley, some 2.5 miles (4.0 kilometres) south of the centre of Gateshead town centre on "one of the main link roads" into the centre of both Gateshead and Newcastle–upon–Tyne, England. The distance from Low Fell to London is 254 miles (409 kilometres). Low Fell occupies an elevated position which slopes down from east to west. Though the principal routes through Durham Road and Kells Lane are of gentle slope, some parts of the suburb are quite steeply sloped– notably those which border Sheriff Hill to the east (Church Road particularly). The land upon which the settlement is built contains predominantly sandstone, grindstone and clay.

After the enclosure of Gateshead Fell, Low Fell developed firstly into a village but following the subsequent large urban expansion of Gateshead, Low Fell was enveloped so that "now it is surrounded by suburban Gateshead, which has developed in dense form around it with little visual delineation" and in 1974 the village was formally incorporated into Tyne and Wear as part of the Metropolitan Borough of Gateshead by the Local Government Act 1972. Until the implementation of that Act, Low Fell was part of the ceremonial county of County Durham as part of the County Borough of Gateshead. It is now bordered by a number of settlements which also now form part of the Metropolitan Borough of Gateshead. These are Sheriff Hill to the east, Saltwell/Shipcote to the north, Allerdene to the south and the Team Valley Trading Estate to the west. The precise boundaries of the suburb are difficult to ascertain, though the southern boundary was fixed with certainty at the junction of Kells Lane and Durham Road by the Parliamentary Boundaries Act 1832 and the eastern border with Sheriff Hill is clearly demarcated by Sheriff's Highway/Old Durham Road.

Though the urbanisation of Gateshead around it has detracted from the panoramic views of western Gateshead that were once enjoyed by residents, at elevated positions views of Lobley Hill, Team Valley and Dunston Hill can be glimpsed. Although now a suburb of the Metropolitan Borough of Gateshead, the openness and greenspace prevalent in Low Fell means that the suburb continues to enjoy a rural feel, which is an unusual trait in the modern Gatshead conurbation.

== Demography ==
Low Fell compared
	Low Fell	Gateshead	England
total population	8,643	191,151	49,138,831
white	98.9%	98.4%	90.9%
BME	1.1%	1.6%	4.6%
aged 75+	9%	8%	9%
male	49%	48.3%	48.7%
female	51%	51.7%	51.3%

According to the United Kingdom Census 2001, Low Fell has a population of 8,643. 51% of the population are female, slightly below the national average, whilst 49% are male. Only 1% of the population are from a Black or other Minority Ethnic Group (BME), as opposed to 9.1% of the national population. Of the BME group in the settlement, 40% are from the Asian or Asian–British ethnic group. Low Fell has a very low proportion of lone parent households at some 4% of all households in the settlement. This is the lowest figure in the Metropolitan Borough of Gateshead and compares very favourably with a Borough average of 11.5% and a national average of 9.5%. Some 26% of households have dependent children, as opposed to 29.5% nationally and 28.4% in Gateshead. The Index of Multiple Deprivation, which divides England into 32,482 areas and measures quality of life indicators to indicate deprivation, does not include any part of Low Fell in any of the areas marked as deprived.

Low Fell compares very favourably with the wider Gateshead area in respect of adults with educational qualifications. Only 23% of adults in the settlement have no educational qualifications (the lowest figure in the Metropolitan Borough of Gateshead), compared to 38.4% across the whole of Gateshead and the England average of 28.9%. 55% of adults have at least five or more GCSEs or equivalent at A*–C (compared to 46.6% nationally) and, of these, 28% are qualified to degree level.

Low Fell ethnicity	Census 2001	Census 2011
White	98.9%	97.6%
White British	97.7%	96.1%

== Economy ==
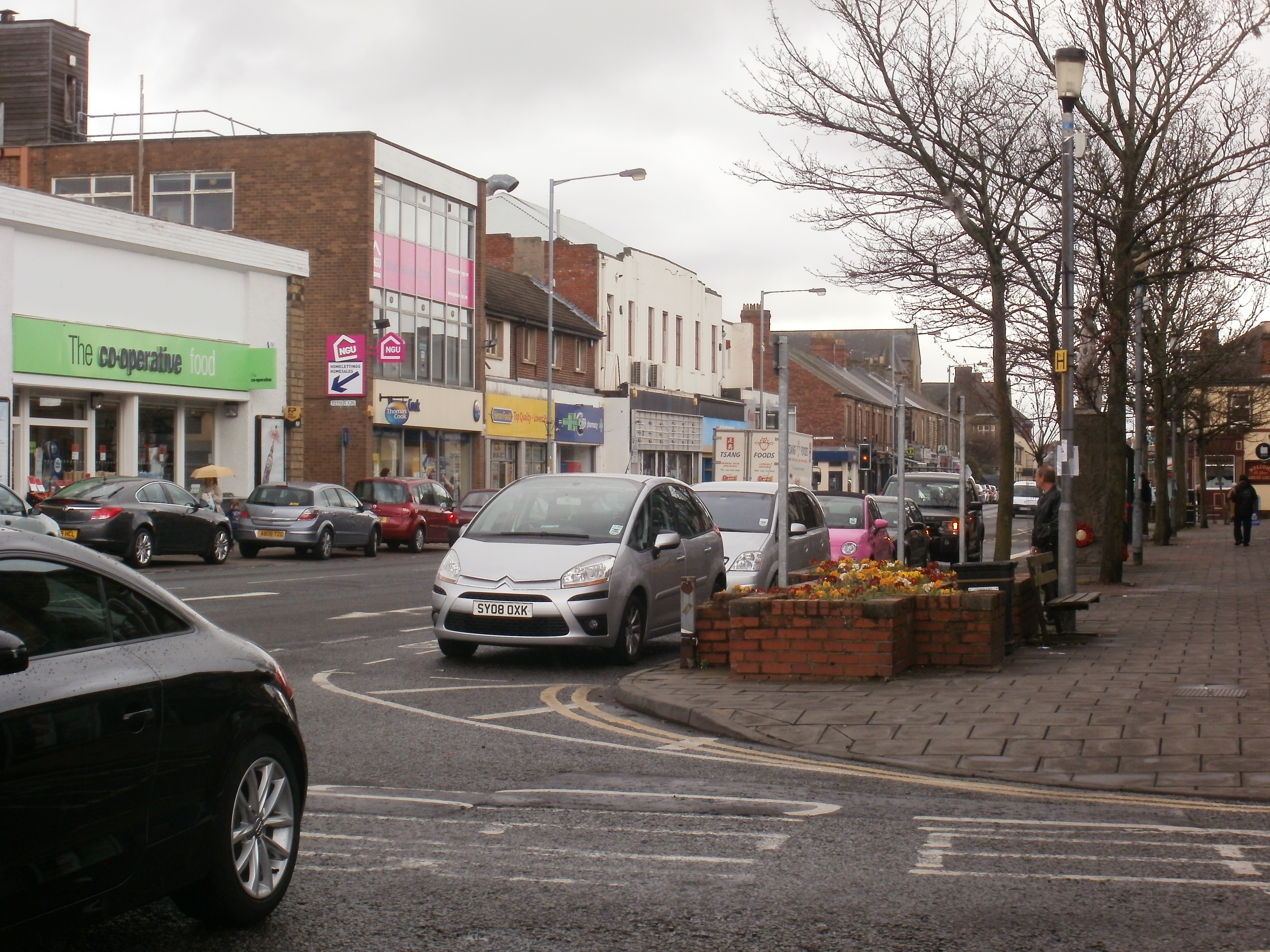
Durham Road, viewed from the junction of Belle Vue Bank. Durham Road has developed into the economic hub of the settlement.

Prior to enclosure, Low Fell was predominantly inhabited by a small number of tinkers and hawkers but after enclosure the character of the suburb changed rapidly as people moved to be close to the new turnpike road. Although neighbouring Sheriff Hill thrived through an influx of heavy industry, built upon a colliery and pottery particularly, by 1827 new allotment owners on Low Fell had spent heavily to improve land so that sod cottages were a rarity and the last remaining pit heaps had been removed. The result was that numerous wealthy individuals were drawn to the area and it was this influx which helped shape and grow the early settlement, as opposed to the more usual means of growth allied to work and industry. The 1880s were a decade of considerable building in the village, fueled by the completion of a tramway with nearby Gateshead in 1883 and this brought some light industry to the area; in the same year Mawson & Swan built their dry plate works in Kells Lane and this proved to be the first of several light industries to locate in that area. These smaller industries, allied to several farms in the Dryden Road area of the village (Dryden Farm, Orchard Cottage Dairy Farm and Derwent Crook Farm all survived in this area until the Second World War), generated a small economy in an area where inhabitants had built and settled predominantly to escape the dirt and grime of industrial Tyneside.

As Gateshead expanded southward to meet the village, Low Fell became a residential suburb of Gateshead but one which has, through its atypical development, has retained a rural village character. In 1897, the first shops were built on Durham Road. These expanded substantially so that by 1939 the villagers were able to forgo travel to nearby Gateshead for commercial purposes. Today the Durham Road area is "a vibrant commercial hub with thriving shops, bars and restaurants" as well as some banks and small offices. These now act as the principle commercial centre for the area though the townscape in this area varies greatly and the unsympathetic development at the crest of Albert Drive in the 1960s is uncommon and has been said to detract from the suburb. A smaller commercial area developed at Kells Lane, again predominantly built through small enterprise, and today the area contains a butcher's shop, a bakery, hair dressers and a greengrocers.

The unemployment levels in the suburb are very low compared to both local and national levels at 2.6%. The overall level of economic activity in Low Fell in 2004 was 69%, as compared to 61% in Gateshead overall and 67% in England. Manufacturing is the largest sector of employment for residents in the suburb. 15% of all working residents of the suburb do so in a managerial capacity; again, this is the highest figure in the Metropolitan Borough of Gateshead.

== Culture ==
=== Buildings and landmarks ===
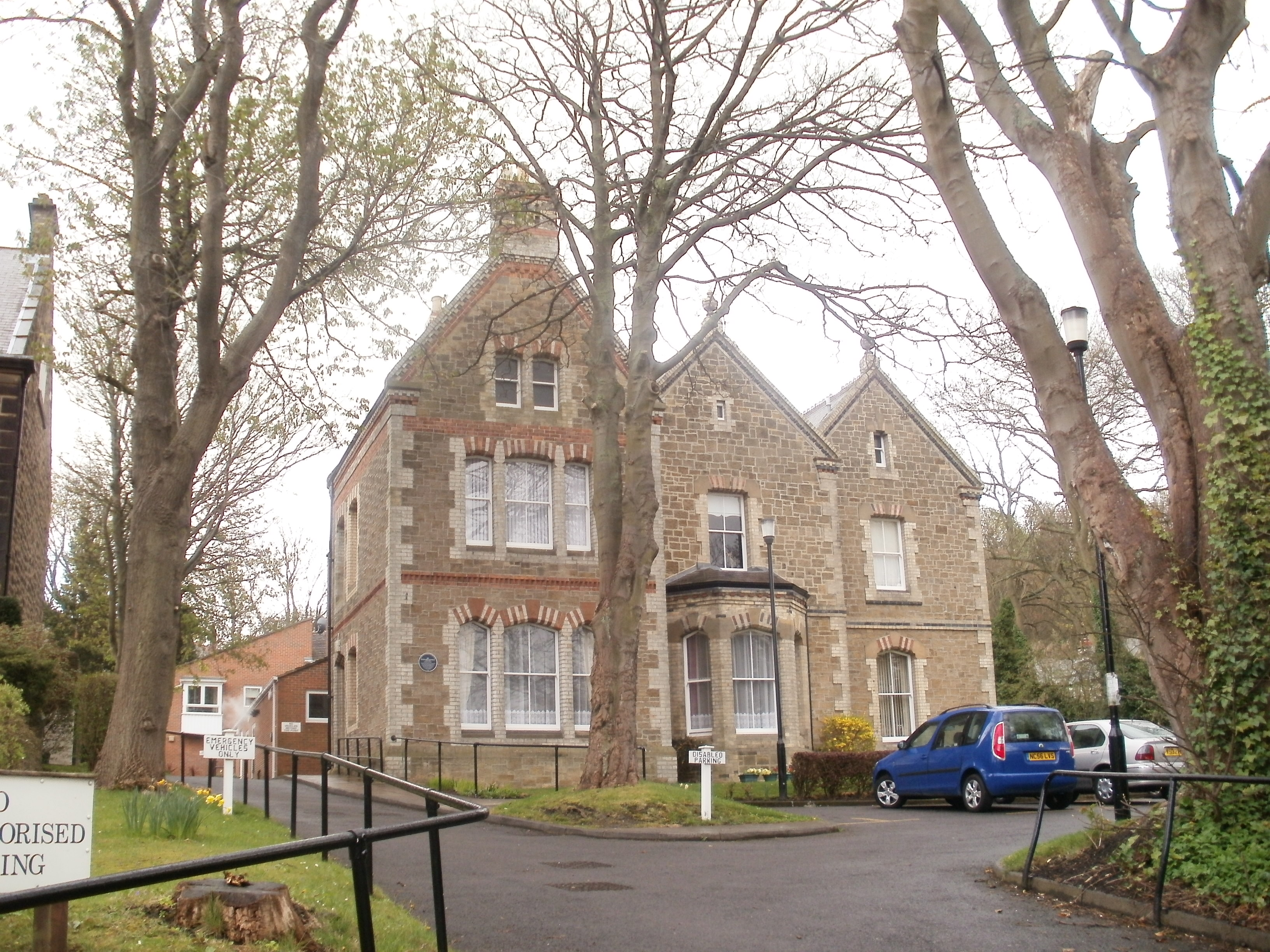
Underhill, 99 Kells Lane

Low Fell is home to numerous buildings listed by English Heritage.

Underhill, at 99 Kells Lane, is a Grade II* listed building. It was the home of Sir Joseph Wilson Swan between 1869 and 1883 and was the site of many pioneering experiments in photographic processing and in electricity. Described as "a large, unlovely polychrome villa", Underhill is triple gabled, and built of roughly dressed sandstone, and was the first private residence in the world to be lit by electric light. It later became a school, and is now retirement sheltered housing.

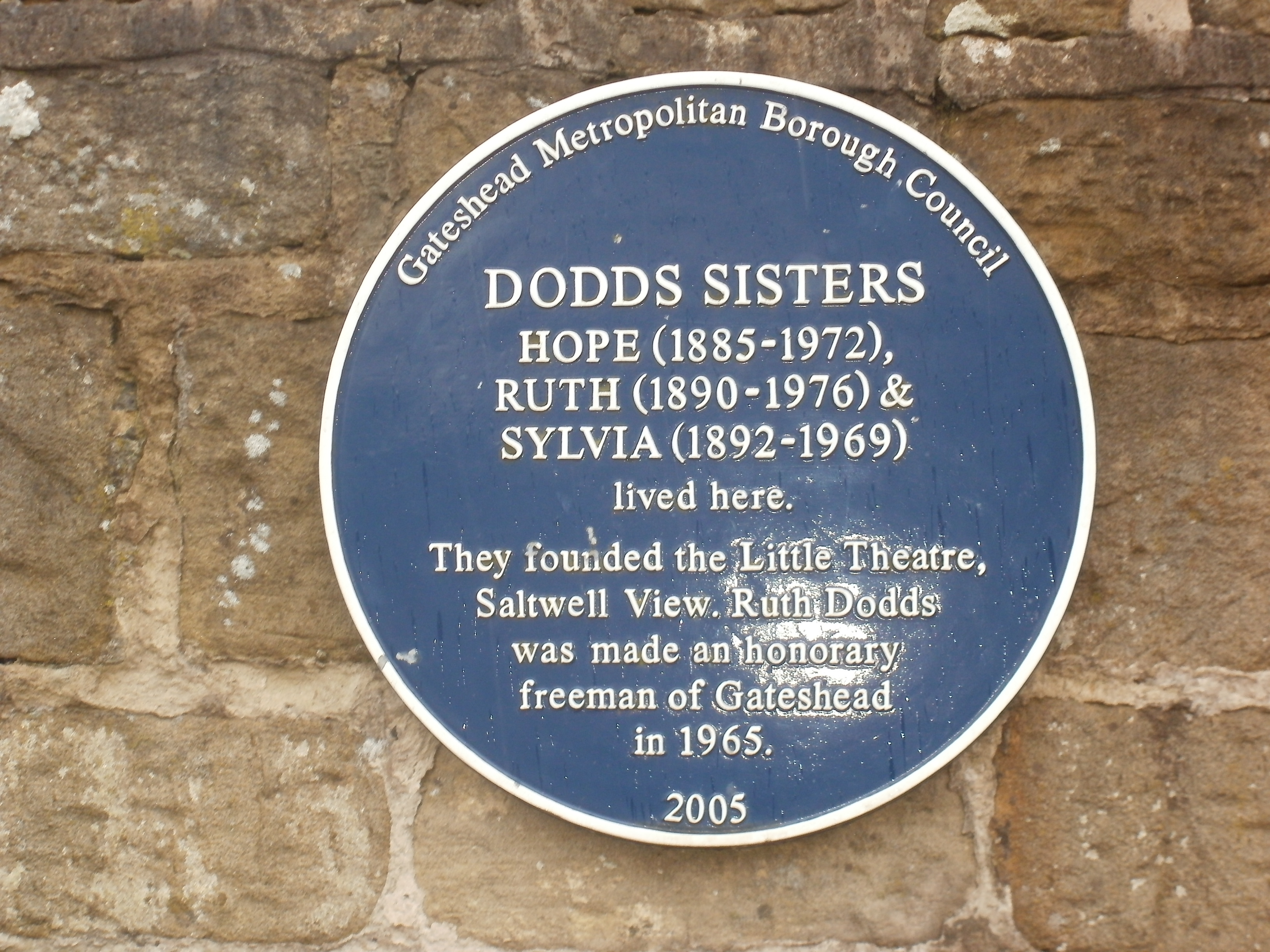
The blue plaque at Home House

231 Kells Lane is the location of Home House. This fine early 19th century, symmetrical, ashlar and sandstone property was the family home of the Dodds sisters, and is also a Grade II listed building. At the southern edge of Durham Road is Carter's Well, the first of the notable buildings and items of interest on that road. 516 Durham Road houses "a stone building with a domestic air". This Grade II listed building was the literary room built by local subscription at the instigation of Thomas Wilson in 1841. Designed by Thomas Oliver, the building was used as a bank and is now The Bank Restaurant and Bar. Immediately adjacent to the Literary Rooms is a Grade II listed South African War memorial, dated 1903, and signed 'Morrison'. Located close to the main shopping centre on Durham Road lies Whinney House, a large villa built in 1865 by local resident Edward Joicey. It is now being converted into luxury flats. An impressive hexagonal based, stone fountain which has Grade II listed status is still in evidence.

Travelling further along Durham Road towards Gateshead are two more Grade II listed buildings. The first is Heathfield House, a two-story villa built by John Wardle (designer of St Helen's Church) in 1865 and Musgrave House, an ashlar villa with raised quoins built in 1854–5 which has been used as a school, but is no longer so. Both buildings are now converted to private flats.

=== Churches ===
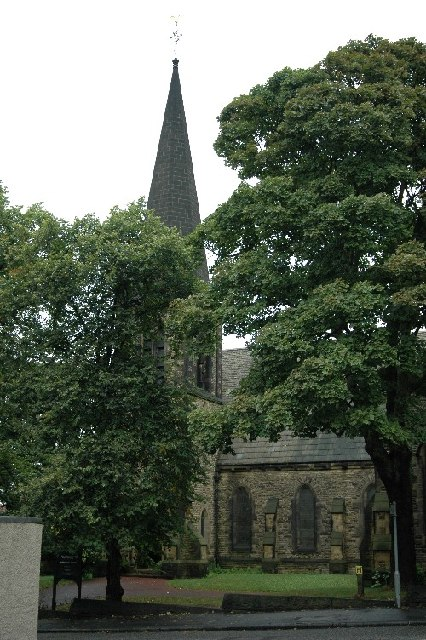
St Helen's Church, Low Fell

The most prominent church in Low Fell is St Helen's Church, a Gothic revival church built from rock–faced sandstone with ashlar details. Costing £13,000 and paid for "by the laudable benevolence of Edward Joicey", the foundation stone of St Helen's was laid on 29 October 1873 and the church was consecrated on 29 August 1876. The result is "a lovely church" located on Belle Vue Bank which benefits from a number of high quality, stained–glass windows. and a Father Willis organ, built for the church and rebuilt in 1949 by H Vincent of Sunderland. St Helen's is now a Grade II* listed building.

Also a Grade II listed building is the Wesley Memorial Methodist Church. Built on a steeply sloping site on Durham Road in 1882 and opened in January 1883, this church is a "pleasing and individual adaptation of early Gothic design", built in tooled sandstone with Welsh slate roof–tiles. There are two further churches in the suburb. These are Denewell Avenue Church and St Peter's. The former was a presbyterian church - now United Reformed Church, located on the corner of Denewell Avenue and Dryden Road which was formed originally in 1907 when a wood and corrugated iron building was erected on a site purchased for £480. This building was soon demolished and replaced with a new building which opened on Good Friday, 10 April 1914. St Peter's, meanwhile, is a Roman Catholic located on Kells Lane which opened in 1962.

=== Venues ===
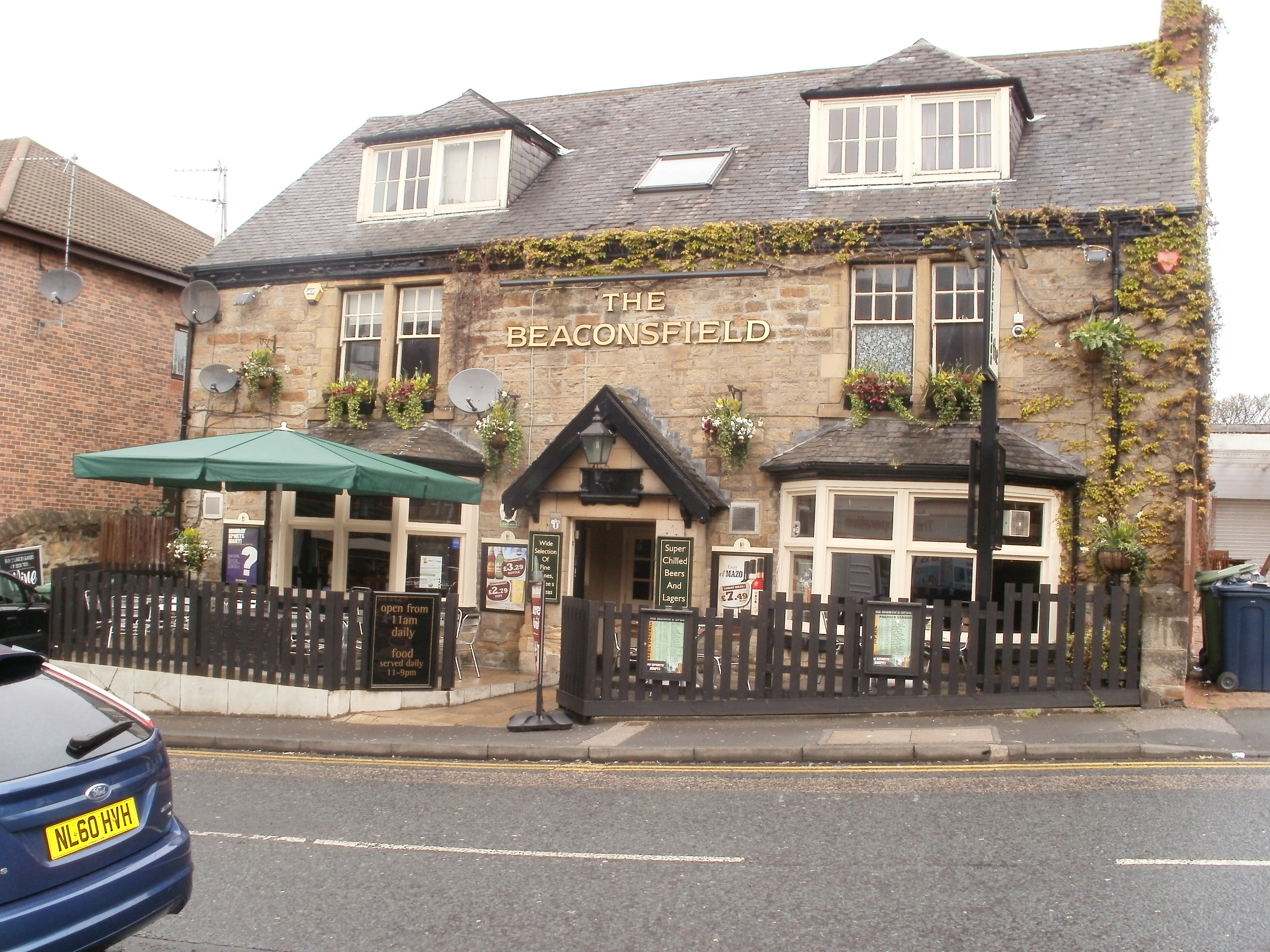
The Beaconsfield, Low Fell

Low Fell is home to numerous public houses. The New Cannon was established on Durham Road in 1826 and soon became something of a social hub for the village, hosting travelling troupes, lessons in quadrille dancing and hosting plays from visiting theatre as early as the 1820–30s. So successful was the New Cannon that in those formative years it "monopolised trade on the new major route and was, in fact, the centre of village life". The Cannon Inn still survives today, along with other public houses such as the Black Horse on Kells Lane, the Buck (now The Beaconsfield) on Beaconsfield Road (formerly Buck Lane), the Crown (now the Tap at Carters Well) and the Gateshead Arms on Durham Road. All of these venues were in existence prior to 1858.

The suburb was also once home to a pair of cinemas; the Classic and the Capitol (confusingly, this cinema was also later named 'The Classic'). The original Classic was located on Kells Lane and was opened in 1928, whilst the Capitol was located on Durham Road and opened in 1936. Both closed prior to the turn of the 21st century.

== Notable residents ==
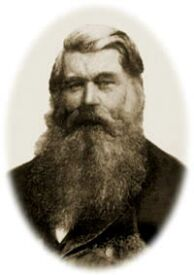
Sir Joseph Wilson Swan

Sir Joseph Swan is famous for being the inventor of the incandescent light–bulb (though also instrumental in improvements to photographic film and rechargeable batteries), lived at Underhill, 99 Kells Lane in Low Fell between 1869 and 1883.

Arthur Holmes was a geologist of international reputation and an early proponent of the theory of continental drift. He pioneered the use of radiometric dating of minerals and was the first earth scientist to grasp the mechanical and thermal implications of mantle convection, which led eventually to the acceptance of plate tectonics, and has a blue plaque outside his childhood home on Primrose Hill.

Other notable former residents include J. Thomas Looney, an elementary school master whose controversial text 'Shakespeare Identified' founded the Oxfordian theory of Shakespeare authorship, Thomas Wilson, a local poet most famous for his 1843 work The Pitman's Pay., and Will Lawson, an Australian poet and novelist who was born here. Ruth Dodds was a prominent Labour politician in Gateshead who, along with her sisters Hope and Sylvia Dodds, funded the building of the Little Theatre Gateshead. All three lived in Low Fell their entire lives.

Steve “The Bridge” Aspinall, a nationally renowned civil engineer and part of the engineering team in constructing the Gateshead Millennium Bridge, won the Robert Stephenson Award.

Socialist singer/songwriter Alex Glasgow, the so–called "bard of Tyneside", is best remembered for writing and singing the theme tune to the BBC television classic When the Boat Comes In. Glasgow lived at 59 Church Road in Low Fell until he emigrated to Australia in 1981. A Gateshead Blue Plaque was erected on the wall of his old house in February 2006 Former England international cricketer Graham Onions lives in Low Fell having previously played for nearby Gateshead Fell Cricket Club.

== Transport ==
Low Fell is located on the A167 – the former route of the Great North Road and the A1, before it was diverted first to the Tyne Tunnel and then to its present route on the Western Bypass. The journey time by car or bus to Gateshead is about 10 minutes, and 15 minutes to Newcastle upon Tyne.

The nearest National Rail stations are Heworth and Newcastle, with the nearest Tyne and Wear Metro station located at Gateshead.

The settlement lies on a busy bus corridor, with frequent services operating in and around Gateshead and Newcastle upon Tyne. Services are operated by Arriva North East and Go North East.

== Education ==
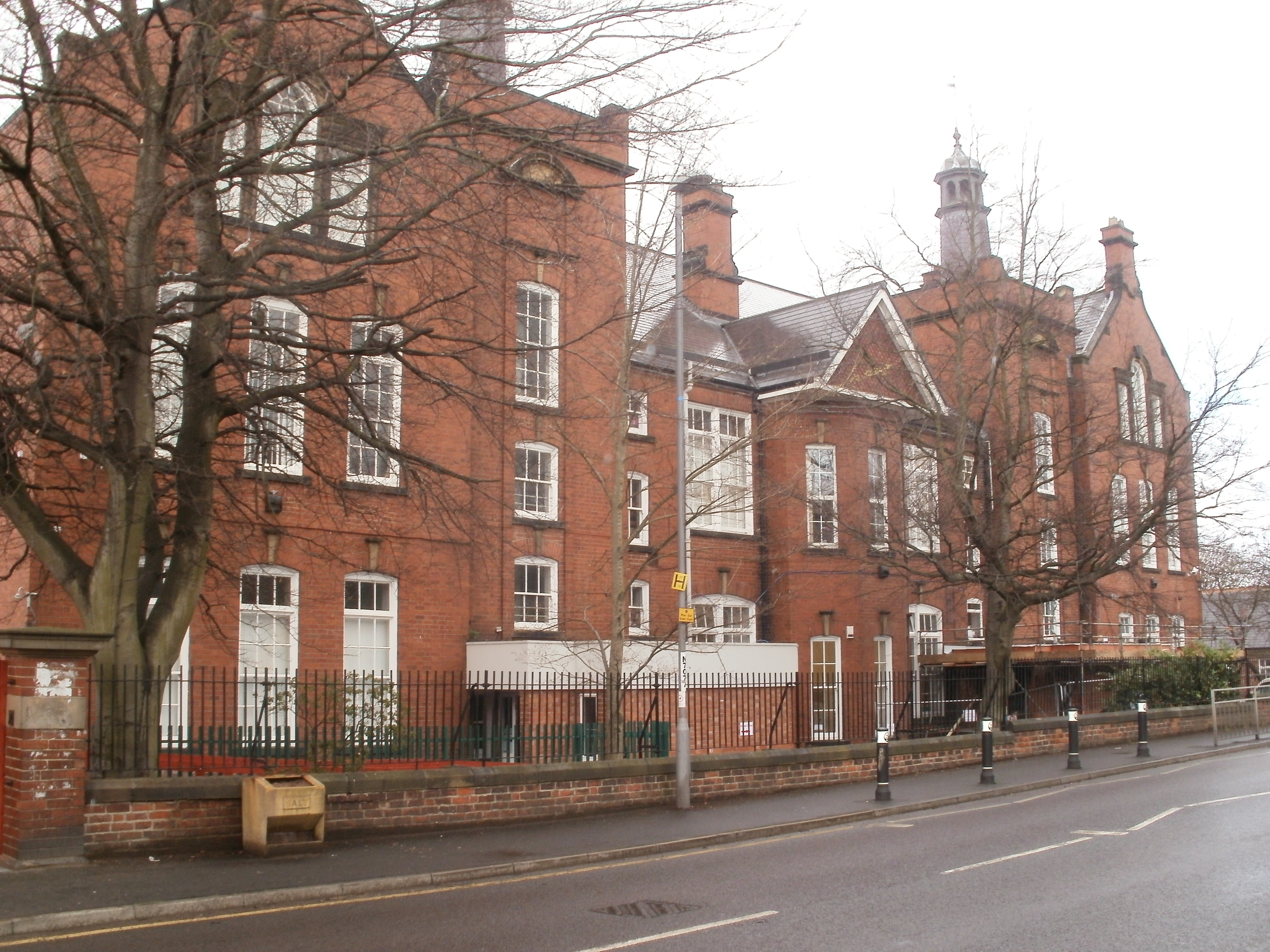
Kells Lane Primary School, Low Fell

Until the establishment of Kells Lane Primary School in 1895, education provision in Low Fell relied largely upon the contribution of local residents such as Thomas Wilson, whose literary rooms on Durham Road provided classes for residents. There are now several schools in the suburb.

Low Fell has three primary schools - Kells Lane Primary School on Kells Lane, St Peter's RC Primary School on Dryden Road, and Oakfield Infant and Junior School on Chowdene Bank. Kells Lane Primary, St Peter's RC Primary and Oakfield Infant School were all rated 'Outstanding' in their most recent Ofsted inspections; Oakfield Junior School was rated 'Good'.

At secondary level, Grace College is situated on Saltwell Road South and was rated by Ofsted in 2018 as 'Inadequate'. Low Fell also falls within the catchment areas of certain secondary schools in other areas of Gateshead, such as the selective state school Emmanuel College in Lobley Hill which was rated 'Outstanding' in 2013, and Cardinal Hume Catholic School in Beacon Lough, which in 2014 was also rated 'Outstanding'.

Low Fell also has two specialist schools for students with additional educational needs. The Cedars Academy on Ivy Lane is a school for students aged 3–19 with a range of special educational needs and was rated 'Good' in 2012. The Dryden School on Shotley Gardens caters for students aged 11–19 with severe or profound multiple learning difficulties and was rated 'Outstanding' in 2015.

== Bibliography ==
=== Academic texts ===
- Altrocchi, Paul (2009). So Richly Spun. iUniverse. ISBN 978-1-4401-2393-1.
- Atkinson, Sid (2001). The Church on the Bank. St Helens and Gateshead Council.
- Brazendale, Alan (2004). Old Images (Images of Gateshead). The History Press Ltd. ISBN 0-7524-2073-9.
- Carlton, Ian Clark (1974). An account of the Great Floods in the River's Tyne, Wear and Tees. Gateshead Corporation. ISBN 0-901273-04-X.
- Faulkner, Thomas (2006). Gateshead and Newcastle, Architecture and Heritage. The Bluecoat Press. ISBN 1-904438-29-6.
- Hope Dodds, Madeleine. The History of Low Fell. Gateshead Libraries.
- Lewis, Samuel (1831). A Topographical Dictionary of England. Lewis & Co. ISBN 0-8063-1508-3.
- Manders, Francis William David (1973). A History of Gateshead. Gateshead Corporation. ISBN 0-901273-02-3.
- Marshall, T (1991). Gateshead Place Names and History:Miscellaneous Notes. Gateshead Central Library.
- McCombie, Grace (2009). Newcastle and Gateshead. Yale University Press. ISBN 978-0-300-12664-8.
- Pevsner, Nikolaus (2002). Architectural Guide- County Durham (2nd Rev. Ed). Yale University Press. ISBN 0-300-09599-6.
- Wilson, Thomas (1843). The Pitman's Pay and other poems. Wilson Douglas, Simpkin & Charnley.

=== Journals, publications, reports and other sources ===
Where an abbreviation is used in the references this is indicated below in (brackets) at the end of the source name. When a source is available online, a link has been included.

- Cain, Frank (7 December 2011). St Peter's Primary School–Inspection Report (PDF). OFSTED.
- Dower, Brian (17 October 2007). Kells Lane Primary School–Inspection Report (PDF). OFSTED.
- David, Hopps (9 January 2010). Graham Onions' heroics bring a glow to club that taught him how to bat.
- Overbury, Karen (14 September 2009). Low Fell: Bustling area is ever-popular. Newcastle Evening Chronicle.
- Morgan, Bryn (2001). General Election results June 7, 2001 (PDF). House of Commons Library.
- Neil, Derek (14 February 2012). Oakfield Junior School–Inspection Report (PDF). OFSTED.
- Plater, Alan (17 May 2001). Obituaries- Alex Glasgow.
- Rayner, Stuart (4 April 2012). Graham Onions hungry for an England Test recall. Newcastle Evening Chronicle.
- Richards, Linda (9 September 2010). Blue plaques maps show off famous spots]. Newcastle Evening Chronicle.
- Shapiro, James (4 November 2011). Shakespeare a fraud? Anonymous is ridiculous.
- Simmonds, CCG (1957). Low Fell Presbyterian Church, Denewell Avenue. Gateshead Central Library.
- Thomas, Marian (7 February 2012). Dryden School–Inspection Report (PDF). OFSTED. Archived from the original (PDF) on 17 October 2012.
- Thompson, M (2011). Oakfield Junior school–Prospectus. Oakfield School Governors.
- Warn, Chris (2004). Kells Lane Primary School–Inspection Report (PDF). OFSTED.
- Younger, Alistair (9 March 2010). The Cedars School–Inspection Report (PDF). OFSTED.
- Unknown. GS01 Low Fell West (PDF). Gateshead Council.
- Unknown (5 January 2007). Low Fell Conservation Area Management Plan(LFCAMP). Gateshead Council.
- Unknown (April 2012). Low Fell Liberal Democrats- About Low Fell. The Liberal Democrats.
- Unknown (2012). Low Fell- Ward Factsheet (PDF). Gateshead Council.
- Unknown (June 2004). Low Fell- Census 2001: Ward Factsheet (PDF). Gateshead Council.
- Unknown (2012). St Peter's RC Primary School- Prospectus. St Peter's Board of Governors.
- Unknown (March 2012). Ward Information- Low Fell 2012. Gateshead Council.
