= James Woodeson =

Sir James Brewis Woodeson CBE (14 October 1917 – January 1980) was a British businessman closely associated with the founding of Northern Engineering Industries.

== Career ==
Educated at Oundle School, Woodeson was commissioned into the Royal Artillery and posted to 72nd (Northumbrian) Field Regiment on 11 February 1939. He saw action in the North African campaign during the Second World War. He was wounded in the leg and captured by German troops and then spent a year in an Italian Prisoner of War camp. Promoted to captain, he returned to the UK and was assigned to the Special Operations Executive. He was tasked with operating the motor gunboat MV Gay Viking in blockade running for the Merchant Navy. Gay Viking was deployed in September 1943, carrying cargo from the Swedish port of Lysekil to the Humber. Woodeson was appointed an Officer of the Order of the British Empire on 17 July 1945.

After the war, Woodeson joined the crane maker Clarke Chapman and served as its chairman from 1949 until 1977. He also served as chairman of Reyrolle Parsons from 1974 to 1977. The companies merged to form Northern Engineering Industries with Woodeson as chairman and chief executive in 1977.

Woodeson was advanced to Commander of the Order of the British Empire in the 1972 New Year Honours and appointed a knight bachelor in the 1977 New Year Honours. He died in a car accident at Heiferlaw Bank on the A1 road in Northumberland in January 1980.
