= Mary Wilson =

Mary Wilson may refer to:

- Mary Wilson, Lady Wilson of Rievaulx (1916–2018), British poet, wife of Harold Wilson
- Mary L. G. Carus-Wilson (1861–1935), English author and speaker
- Mary Louise Wilson (born 1931), American film, musical theatre, stage and television actress
- Mary Wilson (singer) (1944–2021), American singer, member of Motown group The Supremes
  - Mary Wilson (album), a 1979 album by Mary Wilson
- Mary Wilson, host of Radio New Zealand's Checkpoint news programme
- Mary Ellen Wilson (1864–1956), child abuse victim whose case spurred on the founding of the New York Society for the Prevention of Cruelty to Children
- Mary Wilson (broadcaster) (born 1967), Irish broadcaster and journalist
- Mary Elizabeth Wilson (1893–1963), serial killer known as "the Merry widow of Windy Nook"
- Mary Evans Wilson (1866–1928), Boston civil rights activist
- Mary Ann Wilson (1936–2025), American nurse and TV exercise presenter
- Mary Anne Wilson (1802–1867), English opera singer
- Mary Wilson, character in 1941 American comedy Angels with Broken Wings
- Mary Wilson, widow of Ralph Wilson and leader of the trust that holds ownership of the Buffalo Bills
- Mary Pat Wilson (born 1963), Puerto Rican Olympic skier
- Mary Wilson (politician) (active since 2018), Canadian politician
- Mary Florence Wilson (1884–1977), librarian for the League of Nations
- Mary Jane Wilson (1840–1916), founded the Catholic religious order, the Congregation of the Franciscan Sisters of Our Lady of Victories
- Mary Georgina Wade Wilson (1856–1939), Scottish artist
- Mary J. Wilson (1937–2020), African-American zookeeper
- Mary Wilson (figure skater) (1940–2024), Australian figure skater
- Mary Louise Defender Wilson (born 1930), Native American storyteller, scholar and educator
- Mary Dunstan Wilson (1870–1959), Australian educator and nun
- Mary Street Wilson, American pastor, teacher, math professor, social justice activist, and political candidate
- Mary Elizabeth Wilson Sherwood (1826–1903), née Wilson, American author and socialite
- Mary Wilson Goelet (1855–1929), née Wilson, American socialite
- Mary Wilson Thompson (1866–1947), née Wilson, Delaware civic leader

== See also ==
- Mari Wilson (born 1954), English singer
- Meri Wilson (1949–2002), American singer
- Marie Wilson (disambiguation)
