= Florence Wilson =

Florence Wilson may refer to:

- Florence Austral, Australian opera singer (maiden name)
- Florentius Volusenus, which can be translated as Florence Wilson, Scottish humanist
- Florence Wilson (figure skater), Canadian figure skater in Canadian Figure Skating Championships
- Mary Florence Wilson (1884–1977) American librarian for the League of Nations
- Romer Wilson, pen-name of Florence Roma Muir Wilson
