= Carr Hill =

Suburb in Tyne and Wear, England

Coordinates: 54.9469°N 1.58548°W

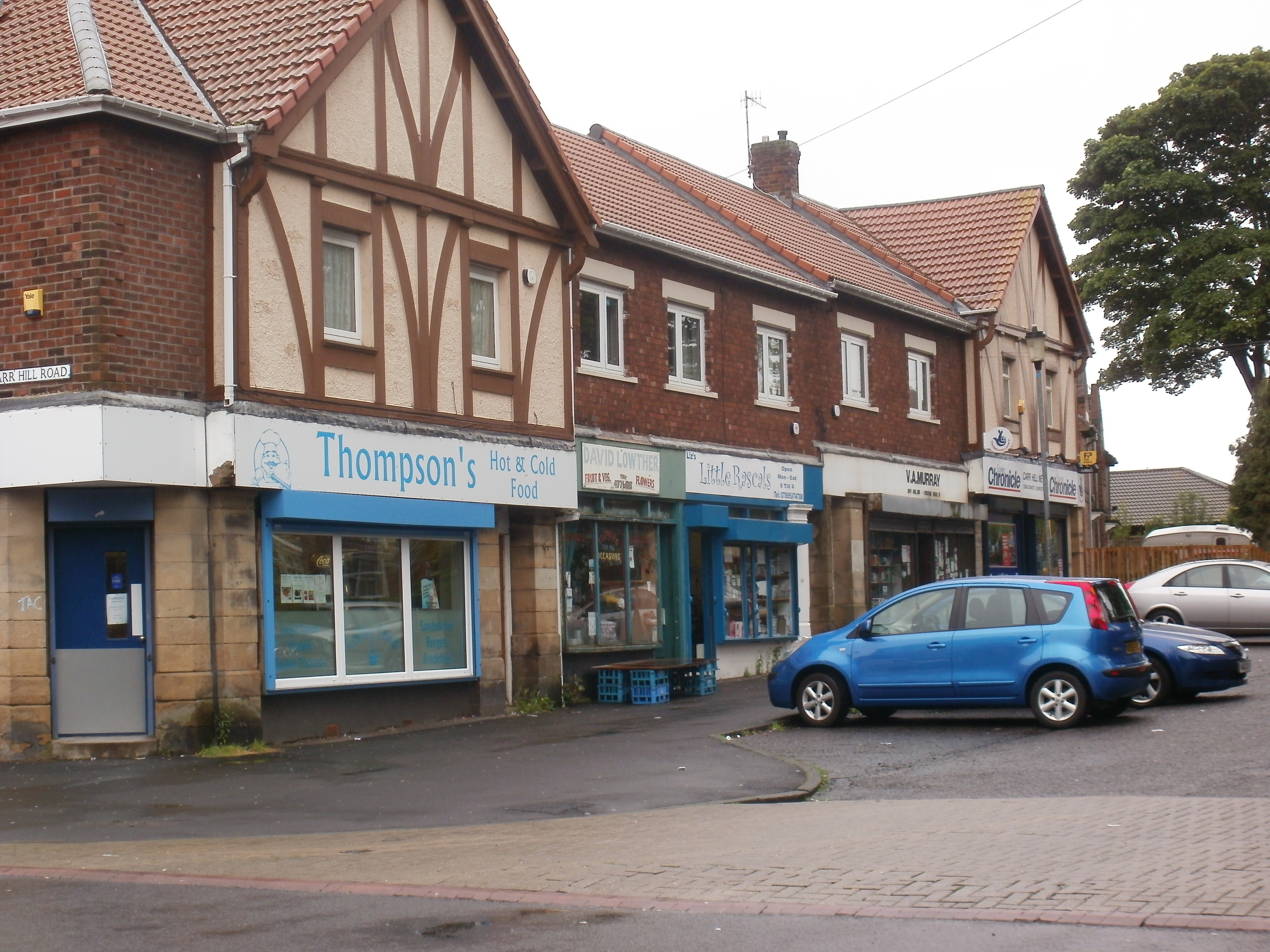
- Shops at the junction of Carr Hill Road

- Location within Tyne and Wear
- Population: 3,465 (2011)
- OS grid reference: NZ2661
- Metropolitan borough: Gateshead
- Metropolitan county: Tyne and Wear
- Region: North East
- Country: England
- Sovereign state: United Kingdom
- Post town: GATESHEAD
- Postcode district: NE9
- Dialling code: 0191
- Police: Northumbria
- Fire: Tyne and Wear
- Ambulance: North East
- UK Parliament: Gateshead Central and Whickham

Carr Hill is a suburb in the Metropolitan Borough of Gateshead in Tyne and Wear, England. It is bordered by Felling to the north, Sheriff Hill to the south, Windy Nook to the east and Deckham to the west. It lies 1.5 miles (2.4 km) south of Gateshead, 2 miles (3.2 km) south of the city of Newcastle upon Tyne and 13 miles (21 km) north of the historic City of Durham. Once a village in County Durham, it was incorporated into the Metropolitan Borough of Gateshead by the Local Government Act 1972 on 1 April 1974.

One of the less populous of the former villages that comprise the metropolitan borough, Carr Hill has a long history and was first developed by the Romans. During the Industrial Revolution it became the centre of pottery making in Tyneside, and numerous stone quarries, glass makers and windmills were set up. It also had a large reservoir providing water to several areas of Gateshead and Newcastle upon Tyne.

Industrial decline from the turn of the 20th century, coupled with the building of Gateshead's first council estate, saw Carr Hill transformed from an industrial settlement into a residential suburb of the Gateshead Council ward of Deckham. Governed locally and nationally by the Labour Party, the suburb is economically disadvantaged compared to other areas of the borough and nationally, with high levels of unemployment and low levels of income. It is served by Carr Hill Primary School. There are two small parks that contribute to the social activity of the area, as does the Elgin Centre at Elgin Road.

== History ==
=== Early history ===
The origins of the name "Carr Hill" are subject to speculation. In the 18th and 19th centuries the village was usually referred to as Carr's Hill, a possessive form suggesting that, like Deckham, the name stems from a notable family in residence. (Note: Some authors have suggested that the name may relate to a John Carr of Dunston Hill, but it is accepted that there is little supporting evidence. See Proctor, 2006: 31 at para.1 and Manders, 1973: 337) It is more likely however that the name was taken from the Scottish Gaelic carr, meaning "rocky shelf".

Parts of the early village were in Upper Heworth, and the remainder in Gateshead Fell, a wild and treacherous area of common land notable for the criminality of the tinkers and hawkers who lived there. (Note: Manders, 1973: 309. Indeed, in March 1888, North Country Lore and Legend, Monthly Chronicle recalled: "Gateshead Fell, as the name implies, was once a wild common, over a portion of which lay the road between Durham and Newcastle. The loneliness of the bleak moorland was quite guile enough to invest it with terror to travellers a hundred years ago and occasionally there were incidents that served greatly to enhance the evil repute of the locality". (author unknown)) There is some evidence of Roman occupation; a proposed enclosure map of Heworth Common from 1766 charts a Roman Causeway running between Carr Hill Lane (now Carr Hill Road) and Blue Quarries in Sheriff Hill. (Note: Proctor, 2006: 22 at para.2 writes "Commissioners appointed to oversee the division of land subject to Enclosures were generally sober types, not given to dreaming up Roman roads that had not existed.") The likely explanation for Roman interest in the area is Swan Pond, twice the size of the pond at Saltwell Park, the fresh water from which might be used to fill bathhouses and flush latrines. Indeed, in 1697, William Yarnold obtained a lease for the laying of cisterns and pipes to bring water from "the Great Pond at Carr's Hill", shown on ordnance survey maps as Swan Pond, to Newcastle upon Tyne.

=== Industrial period 1740–1860 ===
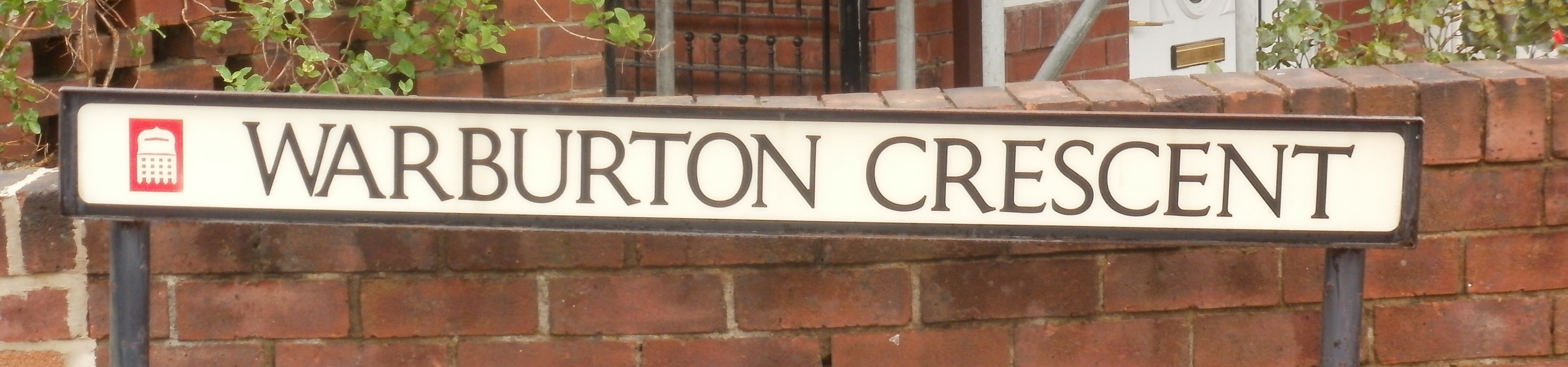
A surviving reference to Carr Hill's rich potting past; Warburton Crescent, named after John Warburton who brought earthenware to the village

The most important event in Carr Hill's formative history occurred in 1740, when John Warburton established a pottery at Carr Hill Lane. Warburton's pottery, later referred to as 'Carr Hill Pottery' and widely credited with bringing white earthenware to the region, transformed the village into one of Gateshead's potting epicentres and encouraged workers and traders to move to the area. Warburton passed the pottery to his son-in-law Issac Warburton in about 1760, and by the time John Warburton died in June 1794 it was the largest in the Tyne Valley, commanding a rent of £100 per annum; by comparison, the Tyne Pottery on Felling shore paid £20. When placed for sale in 1812, the advert described Carr Hill Pottery as "valuable and extensive".

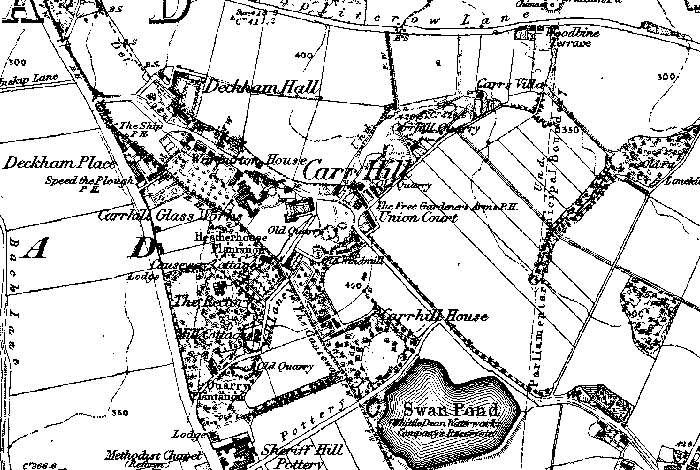
Ordnance Survey Map of Carr Hill, 1862

Carr Hill by 1820 was a modern and populous village, situated on hill, still isolated from Gateshead and Felling. A variety of industries had developed alongside Warburton's pottery and were prospering; a flint glass manufacturer, under the management of Alexander Elliot, three corn mills - Carr Hill Mill, Felling Windmill and St John's Mill (the latter built after an earlier mill was destroyed by a mysterious fire in 1824) – and a fire brick kiln. There were also three inns and "some neat houses occupied by respectable families". By 1840 Carr Hill Reservoir had been built and, under the management of the Newcastle Water Company was the major water supplier for residents in Carr Hill, Sheriff Hill and Windy Nook, and freestone quarries, similar to Kells' Quarry in Windy Nook, were producing Newcastle Grindstone of excellent quality. In 1856 a Methodist Chapel was built. During the mid-19th century, the increasing population led to calls for social amenities to be improved; footpaths were a particular concern, although an examination of ordnance survey mapping demonstrates the continued isolation of the village generally. The success of Warburton's pottery resulted in a street being named after him, but the lack of residential development is evident. Carr Hill glassworks and quarries are still clearly marked, along with Swan Pond and a public house, The Free Gardeners Arms. By the mid-19th century Carr Hill Reservoir was in the hands of the Whittle Dean Water Company, and in 1883 was converted into a 10-million imperial gallon (45 million L; 12 million US gal) open reservoir.

=== Carr Hill House ===
Carr Hill House was the largest estate in the village; a freehold mansion house on Carr Hill Lane. The date of building is unknown, but it does not appear on an enclosure map of 1766, suggesting it was built after that date. There is strong evidence that it was once a lunatic asylum; in 1770 an advertisement in a local newspaper declared:

LUNATICKS
Carr's Hill House on Gateshead Fell
To The Public

We beg Leave to inform the Public that we have opened the above HOUSE pleasantly situated about a mile distant from Newcastle, which we have fitted up in an elegant manner, with every Accommodation for the reception of LUNATICKS in genteel or opulent circumstances: in this House Persons entrusted to our Care shall be treated with the utmost Attention and Humanity. The terms are reasonable. R. Lambert, W. Keenlyside, H Gibson, R. Stoddard (surgeons to the Infirmary), Newcastle 1767.

By the turn of the 19th century Carr Hill House was a residential property and farm, and in 1806 Matthew Atkinson responded to an advertisement in the Newcastle Courant and purchased the 12-acre (4.9 ha) estate. In 1858 the house was in the hands of G. J Kenmir, town clerk of Gateshead from 1855 until 1856, who occupied a 26-acre (11 ha) estate on which he kept a large number of pigs.

=== Industrial decline and modern development ===
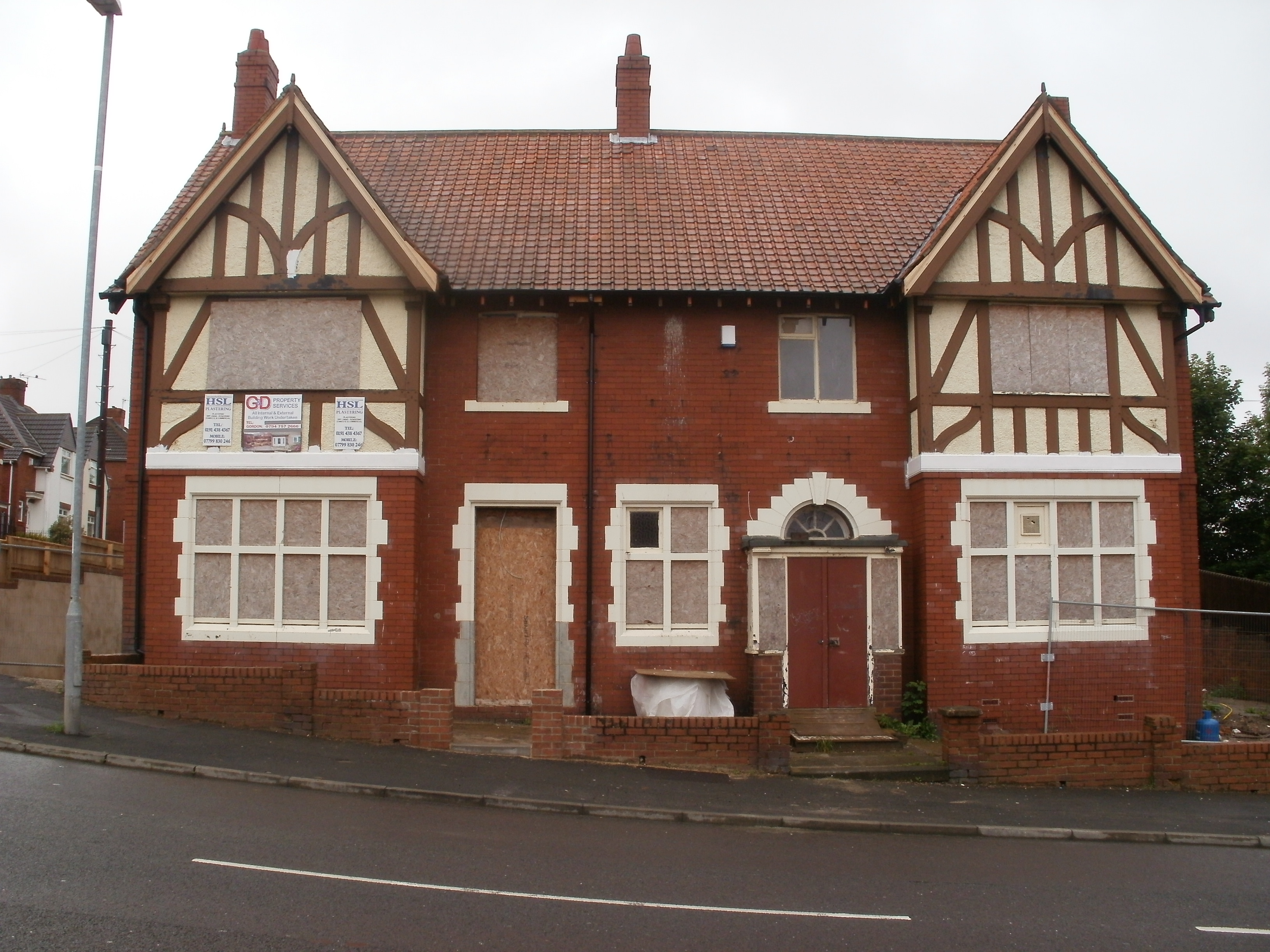
The Old Brown Jug, named in reference to Warburton's pottery which once flourished behind it, stands derelict at Carr Hill Road in 2011

By the late 19th century the village was in steep decline. In 1894, Whellan described Carr Hill as "a scattered village, which ... was dotted with windmills, now fallen into ruins, as are many of the houses." Carr Hill Pottery had operated throughout the 19th century, but the once thriving pottery had by 1860 become little more than a cottage industry, employing a mere 8 employees and paying just £15 per annum in rent. Ownership subsequently transferred to Thomas Patterson, of neighbouring Sheriff Hill Pottery, who eventually closed the Carr Hill works in 1893. The buildings were demolished completely in 1932; only the Old Brown Jug public house and a street named in honour of Warburton survived as reminders of the area's rich pottery heritage by 2010. Carr Hill Quarry on Elgin Road was infilled and replaced by a school, and although the windmills still stood, none operated as a going concern by 1890, and were instead used as tenement property or storehouses Carr Hill Mill was demolished between 1919 and 1939 as was the last remaining mill in 1963. Elliot's glassworks suffered a similar fate, closing in about 1900 and demolished in 1932. Carr Hill House fell into disrepair and was demolished in 1921. Carr Hill Reservoir survived until 1973, but by then the whole of Gateshead and Newcastle were supplied by the Newcastle and Water Company from Catcleugh and Whittle Dene in Northumberland and it had become redundant, and was covered soon after.

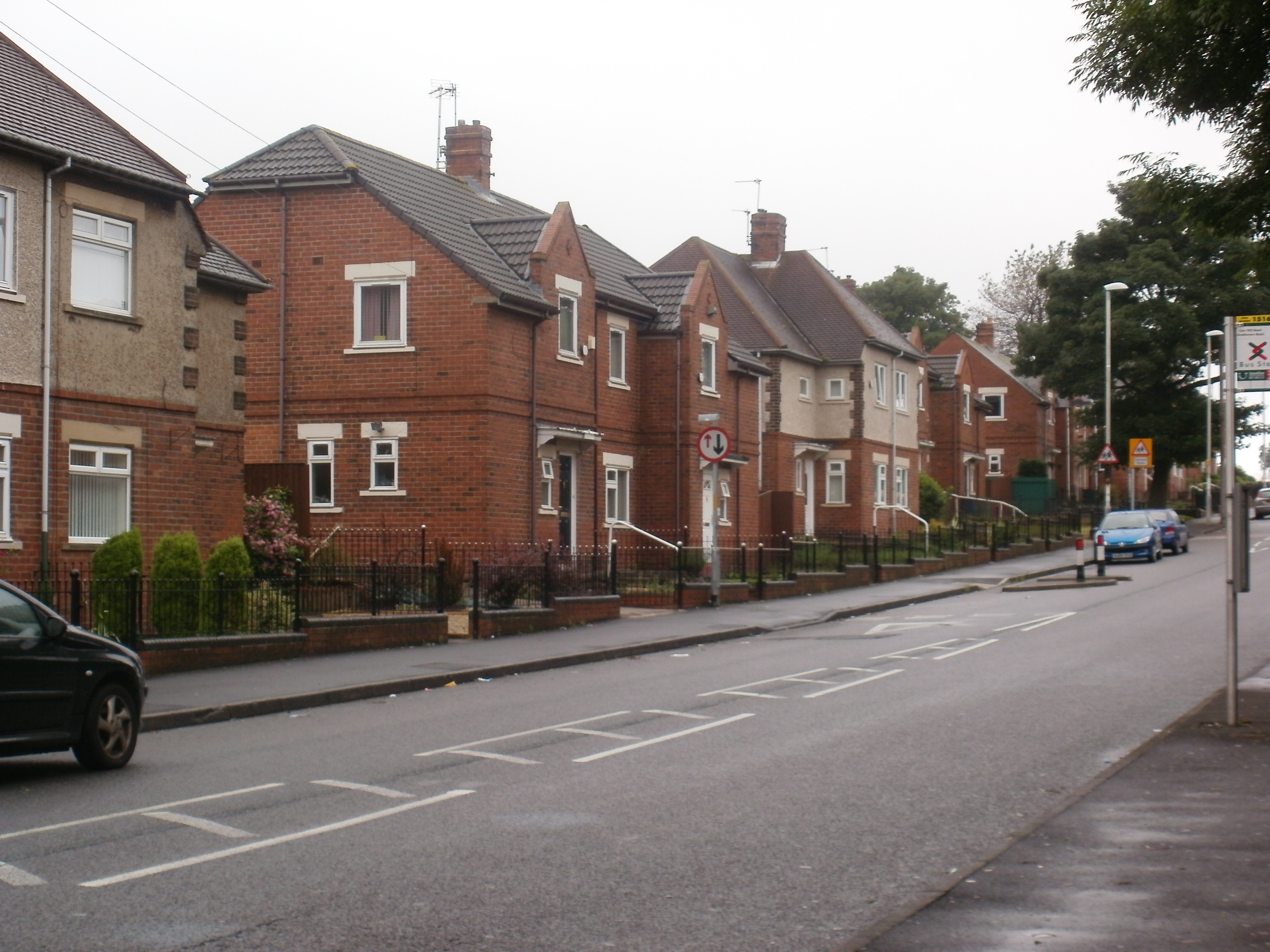
Typical 1920's council housing at Carr Hill Road

Carr Hill today is shaped by the housing development of the 20th century. A building boom begun in Gateshead at the start of the 20th century; large tracts of development at Deckham were matched by development in Carr Hill at Mafeking, Methuen and Baden Powell Streets. In 1911 an offer to build Sutton Dwellings was made to Gateshead Council and was staunchly rebuffed and in 1917 Parliament made a further proposal which was again rejected. However, a Gateshead Council survey concluded in 1919 that "overcrowding in Gateshead was at dangerous levels, that landlords were scrimping on repairs and improvements" and that housing levels were unsustainable in light of rapid population growth. When in February 1919 the Town Improvement Committee recommended the purchase of 214 acres (0.87 km^{2}; 0.334 sq mi) of land between Dryden Road at Low Fell and Carr Hill under the Housing Act 1919, the Council finally yielded and purchased 65 acres (0.26 km^{2}; 0.102 sq mi) of land in Carr Hill and Sheriff Hill at the cost of £19,000. The result was that, in 1921, a large council estate was built in Carr Hill at Iona Road and the surrounding areas. The estate remains largely unchanged and shapes the suburb today, with only the width of Carr Hill Road (indicating a village green), the 'Old Brown Jug' inn building and some stone cottages at Co-Operative Terrace remaining of the industrial village which once stood in its stead.

== Governance ==
Candidate name	Political party	Number of votes	% of votes cast
Brian Coates	Labour	1,407	70%
May Ainscow	Conservative	214	10.7%
Karen Therese Crozier	Liberal Democrats	146	7.3%
John Richards	National Front	124	6.2%
Norman Hall	Trade Unionist and Socialist Coalition	118	5.9%

Carr Hill is in the council ward of Deckham in the Metropolitan Borough of Gateshead. (Note: A small cluster of streets around Brettanby Road in the east are actually in the Windy Nook and Whitehills Ward. See Gateshead Council Windy Nook and Whitehills Ward Factsheet 2012 p.1) This ward is approximately 1.5 square kilometres (0.58 sq mi) in area and has a population of 9,228. It is represented by three councillors. In June 2012, they were Brian Coates, Martin Gannon and Bernadette Oliphant.

Carr Hill is part of the Westminster parliamentary constituency of Gateshead. It was previously in the Gateshead East and Washington West constituency which was abolished by boundary changes before the 2010 UK General Election. For many years the MP was Joyce Quin, who retired on 11 April 2005 and was awarded a life peerage into the House of Lords on 13 June 2006 and is now Baroness Quin.

The present MP Ian Mearns, is a member of the Labour party and his office is in Gateshead. He replaced Sharon Hodgson who successfully campaigned in the newly formed constituency of Washington and Sunderland West. In the 2010 UK General Election, Mearns was elected with a majority of 12,549 over Frank Hindle. The swing from Labour to the Liberal Democrats was 3.9%.

Carr Hill is in a safe Labour seat. Mearns' success in 2010 followed of Sharon Hodgson, who in the 2005 UK General Election polled over 60% of the votes cast whilst in 2001, Joyce Quin was returned with a majority of 53.3%.

== Geography and topography ==
Carr Hill

Climate chart (precipitation, max. and min. temperature)
J	F	M	A	M	J	J	A	S	O	N	D
43 7 3	41 8 3	39 10 4	67 12 5	48 14 8	60 17 11	48 19 13	61 20 13	52 17 10	62 13 8	66 10 5	57 7 3
- █ Average max. and min. temperatures in °C
- █ Precipitation totals in mm
Imperial conversion
J	F	M	A	M	J	J	A	S	O	N	D
1.7 45 37	1.6 46 37	1.5 50 39	2.6 54 41	1.9 57 46	2.3 63 52	1.9 66 55	2.4 68 55	2 63 50	2.5 55 46	2.6 50 41	2.3 45 37
- █ Average max. and min. temperatures in °F
- █ Precipitation totals in inches

Carr Hill, at latitude 54.9469 and longitude −1.58548, is "pleasantly situated" 1.5 miles (2.4 km) south-east of Gateshead and 255 miles (410 km) from London. It lies on a bed of sandstone and clay and the land is steep in places, slopes from south to north and reaches a height of around 140 metres (460 ft) above sea level at the southern fringes. This distinctive, steep topography means that Carr Hill sits atop "a lofty hill" and this provides residents with good views to Newcastle upon Tyne in the north, the north-west and north-east towards the North Sea. Around 25% of the land is open space and 70% residential.

Documents indicate that the settlement boundaries lie at the Split Crow Road in the north, Nursery Lane to the east, Hendon Road to the west and Sheriff Hill to the south. Carr Hill was part of County Durham until it was incorporated into the Metropolitan Borough of Gateshead by the Local Government Act 1972. It is now bordered by settlements which are also part of the metropolitan borough. These are Sheriff Hill to the south, Deckham to the west, Felling to the north and Windy Nook to the east.

The climate in Carr Hill is temperate like much of the north east of England. The mean highest temperature, at 12.8 °C (55.0 °F), is slightly lower than the England average (13.1 °C (55.6 °F)) though the mean lowest temperature, at 7.2 °C (45.0 °F), is somewhat higher (5.6 °C (42.1 °F)). The total annual rainfall, at 643.1 millimetres (25.32 in), is significantly lower than the national average of 838.7 millimetres (33.02 in).

== Demography ==
Carr Hill compared (2001)
	Carr Hill	Gateshead	England
Total population	3,200 (Note: Figure is cumulative total of Lower Layer Super Output Areas Gateshead 011C and 012D per the 2001 UK Census. Gateshead Council records the combined population of the Carr Hill and Sheriff Hill neighbourhoods to be 5,576 (at NPE, 2008: 8) but does not provide separate population figures for the two. All other data is, however, provided separately and is specific to Carr Hill.)	191,151	49,138,831
White (including mixed White)	98.6%	98.4%	90.9%
BME	1.4%	1.6%	4.6%
Aged 0–19	24.8%	24.2%	26.32%
Aged 65+	13.8%	17.3%	15.9%
Male	47%	48.3%	48.7%
Female	53%	51.7%	51.3%

According to the United Kingdom Census 2001, Carr Hill has an approximate population of 3,200 – 53% of the population are female, slightly above the national average, whilst 47% are male. Only 1.4% of the population are from a black or other minority ethnic group (BME), as opposed to 9.1% of the national population. Relatively few pensioners live in the suburb, 12.2% as compared to 15.9% nationally and 17.3% in the borough.

Carr Hill Nook has a high proportion of lone parent households at some 19.3% of all households. This is the fourth highest figure in Gateshead and compares with a borough average of 11.5%. Some 36.9% of households have dependent children, as opposed to 29.5% nationally and 28.4% in Gateshead. This is also the fourth-highest figure in Gateshead. The Index of Multiple Deprivation, which divides England into 32,482 areas and measures quality of life to indicate deprivation, splits Carr Hill into halves and lists one half in the top 5% of all deprived areas in England in 2008. The other half is listed in the top 20% of all deprived areas.

In 2011, Carr Hill had a population of 3,465, compared with 9,938 for the wider Deckham ward.

Carr Hill compared	Carr Hill	Deckham (ward)
White British	93.6%	92.3%
Asian	2.0%	2.4%
Black	0.5%	0.7%

Carr Hill is an area of Deckham and a sub area of the town of Gateshead. In 2011, 6.4% of the population were non-white British, compared with 7.7% for the wider area and ward of Deckham. The ward is split into three sub districts, Central Deckham, Carr Hill and Mount Pleasant. Carr Hill is in the south of the ward and is less ethnically diverse than Mount Pleasant and Central Deckham. But the area is more so than nearby Pelaw and Windy Nook.

== Economy ==
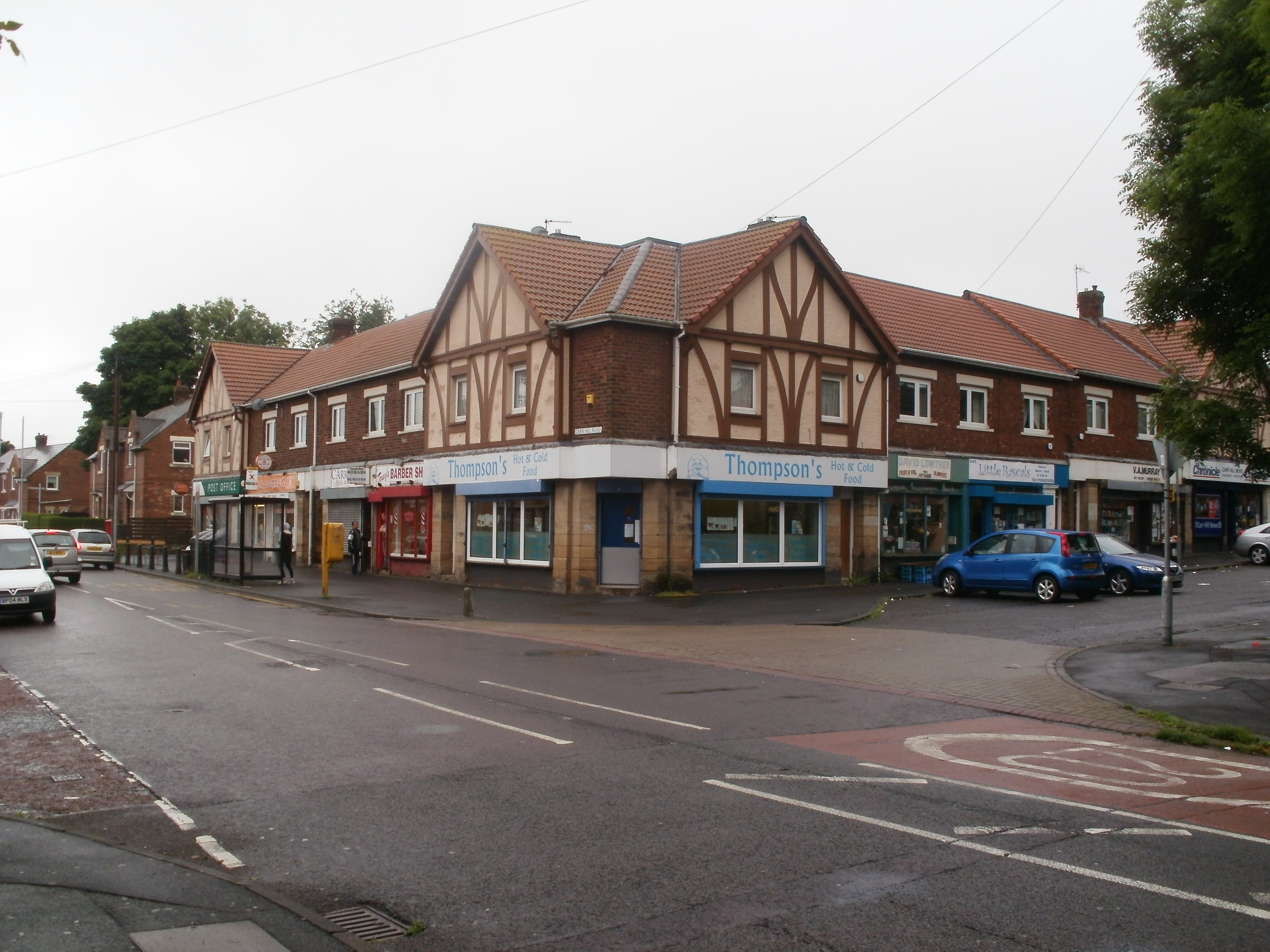
Carr Hill shops

The decline of industry in Carr Hill and the rapid building of residential property transformed the village into a residential estate. There is a small commercial area at the junction of Carr Hill Road and Pottersway, which provides some employment and which has become a "social landmark", but there is no major employer. A Tesco Express store at the eastern fringe of the boundary with Windy Nook opened in 2012 and also provides employment to residents.

Carr Hill performs poorly in comparison to the wider borough in terms of economic activity and opportunity. Some 42% of children in the ward live in poverty, the second-highest figure in Gateshead. The adult unemployment rate is 7%, compared to 5% borough-wide, the joint third-highest figure in Gateshead. Youth unemployment is 10%, also the joint third-highest in the borough. The income of residents is £24,000; £3,000 below the regional median. Carr Hill has only 70 VAT-registered businesses, compared to a borough average of 230. Only 2.6% of residents are self-employed, compared to 4.5% of the borough and 8.3% nationally. Overall, Carr Hill falls within the most deprived 20% of regions in England according to the Index of Multiple Deprivation in 2010.

== Leisure and recreation ==
There are no libraries in Carr Hill, though Gateshead Central Library, the largest in the Metropolitan Borough of Gateshead, is nearby. Gateshead Leisure Centre in Shipcote and Saltwell Park are close by.

=== Parks ===
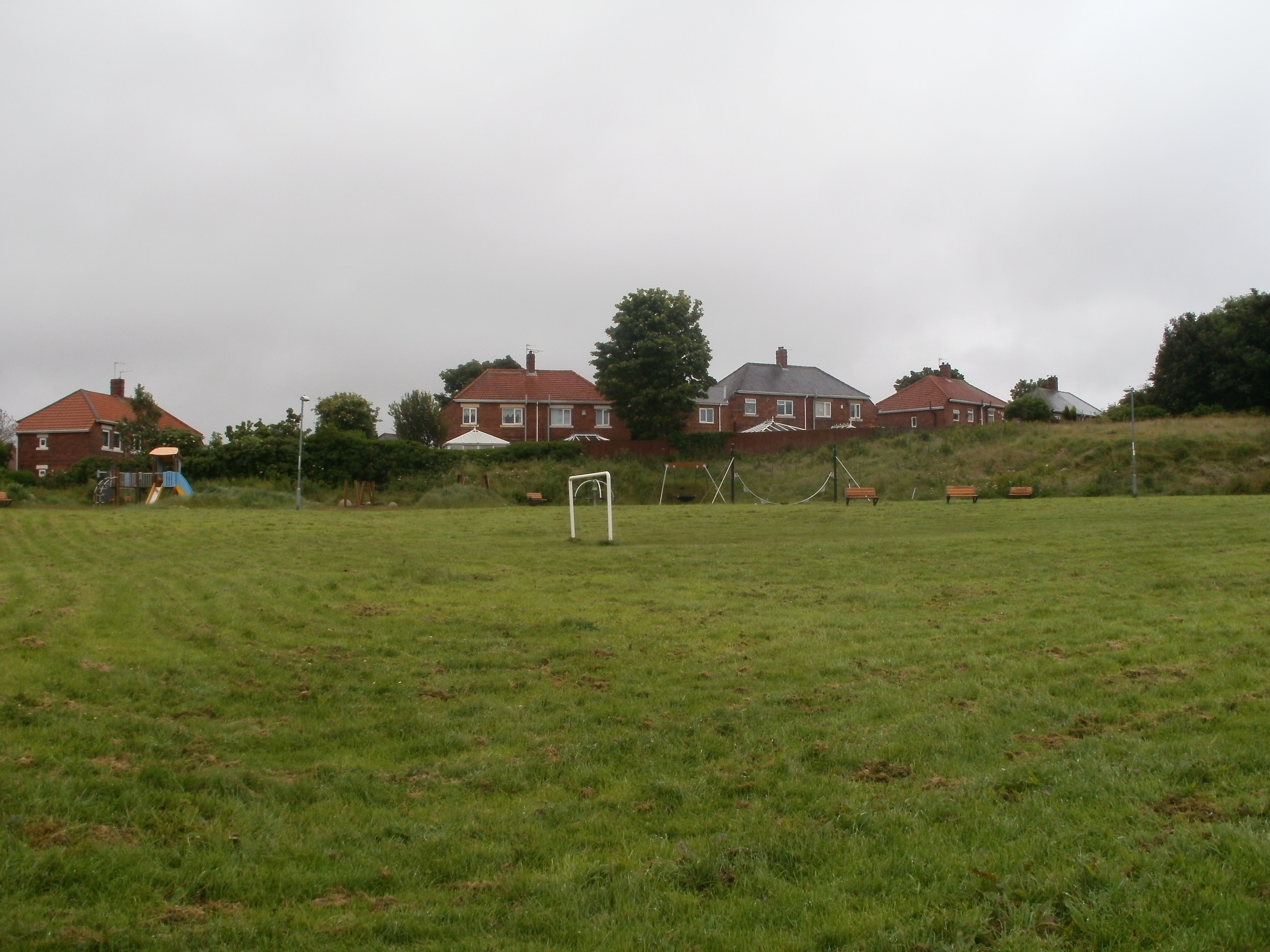
Carr Hill Park

There are two parks in Carr Hill. The first is Carr Hill Park, a small play area at the junction of Northway and Carr Hill Road Previously an under-used resource, the play area was rebuilt in 2009–10 at a cost of £148,000. It now includes spring-mounted play items, rope walks and other play equipment, whilst improvements to lighting, pathways and drainage to the football area were made. The park has become a valuable social open area; whilst in 2010 it hosted the first annual "Mark Turner Memorial Day"; a fundraising event begun after Turner, a Sheriff Hill resident, was killed whilst on duty in Afghanistan. Around 1,000 guests attended, including Michael Hood, the Mayor of Gateshead.

The second park is Carr Hill Reservoir Park, which occupies the site of the covered reservoir at Carr Hill and Ruskin Roads. This is a larger park containing a play area and contained sports area paid for by fundraising by local residents. There is also a full-size football pitch, which is the base of Sheriff Hill Football Club; a club of around 125 players.

=== Venues ===
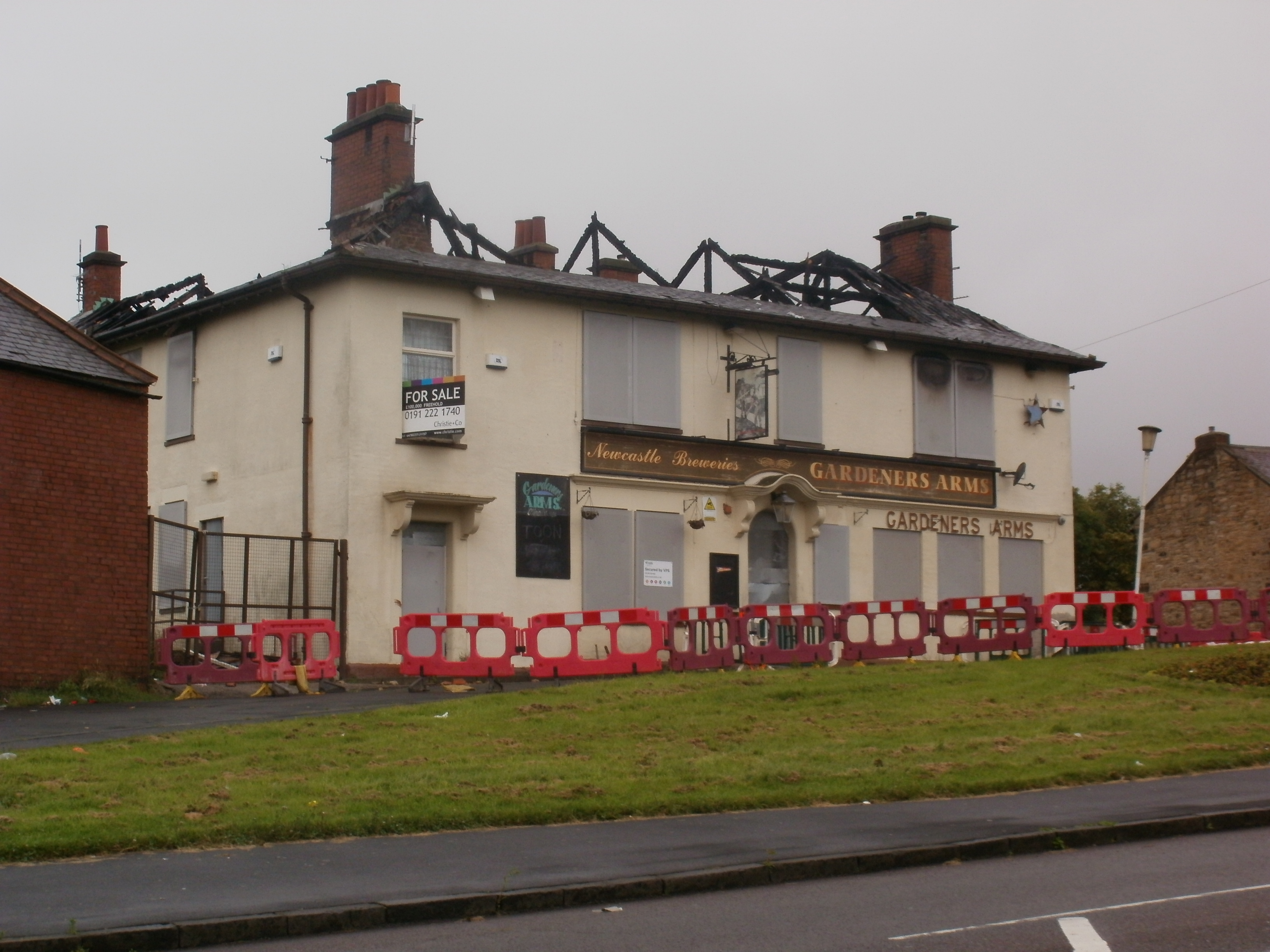
The Gardners Arms, nine days after it was gutted by fire in 2012

There is some evidence that there were at least two inns during the 18th century, although their precise locations and names are unknown. In 1827, Parson and White's Directory listed the Brown Jug, adjoining Carr Hill Pottery at Carr Hill Lane and it is likely that this venue is one of those earlier inns. (Note: "Given the frequent name changes of the public houses on Carr Hill, one gets the impression that the Brown Jug was the most firmly established public house on Carr Hill and the one most likely to date from the 18th century." Proctor, 2006: 26 at para.5) The second is likely the Old Fellows Inn, located near the Brown Jug at Carr Hill Lane, listed in 1844, but later listed as 'The Free Gardeners Arms". By 1856, both the Brown Jug and the Free Gardeners Arms were well established and thriving and continued to prosper well into the 20th century, under the slightly different names of The Old Brown Jug and The Gardeners Arms.

Despite one document referring to both as "social landmarks", they experienced a significant downturn at the turn of the twenty-first century. The Old Brown Jug closed and laid derelict for several years; in 2009 an application was made to convert the property into a block of six apartments. Although the application was declined, the pub and surrounding locale became something of a "no-go" area, and a new application by Yorkshire Homes to convert the public house into a single residential property was approved in 2011. The Gardeners Arms continued to trade until 2011 but was vacant when, on 1 July 2012, the inn was gutted by fire. It was immediately put up for sale by the owners and subsequently demolished.

== Culture and community ==
There are no structures listed by English Heritage in Carr Hill, although the buildings at 179–185 Carr Hill Road were listed locally by Gateshead Council; in 2004 Our Lady of the Annunciation Church was added to the local list.

=== The Elgin Centre ===
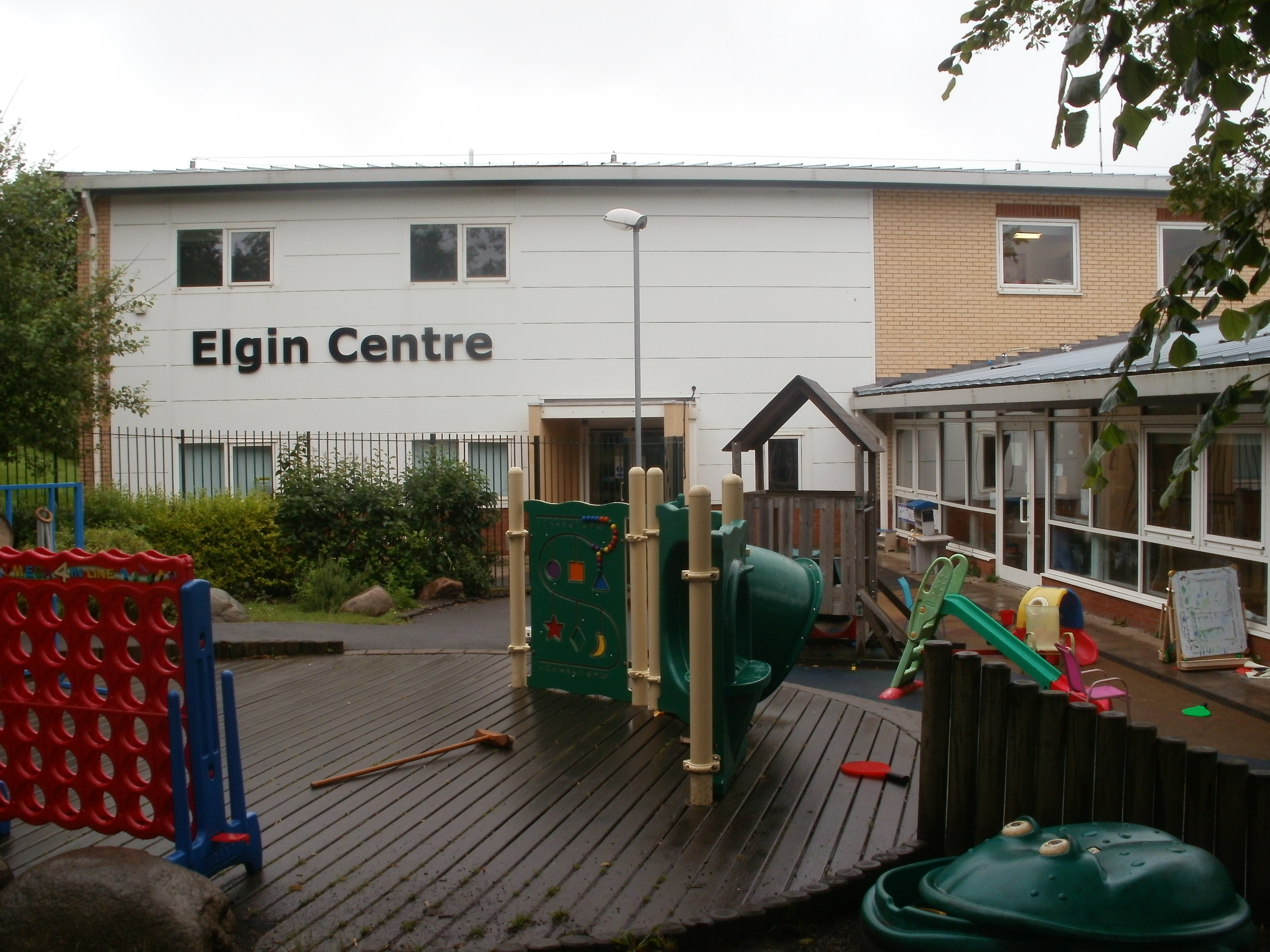
The Elgin Centre provides leisure and community facilities to Carr Hill residents.

The Elgin Centre, on Elgin Road at the south–east boundary between Deckham and Carr Hill, provides "the key cluster" of community provisions for residents. These facilities contribute to the regeneration of the suburb.

The facilities are utilised by the Route 26 Community Project, a registered charity based at the centre that works towards the betterment of lives in Deckham and neighbouring wards. The project works with Gateshead Council and the Gateshead Housing Company to provide a community cafe promoting healthy eating (the T–Junction), a gymnasium, indoor sports hall, outdoor Five-a-side football pitches and a meeting place for resident groups. The project has education provision for young children as a registered day–care provider and it also offers adult education and training. The project hosts the Carnival on the Hill/Deckham Festival, a collaborative enterprise between Route 26, Gateshead Council and Home Group, offering free activities such as go-karting and children's soft play, against the backdrop of a steel band. The second Carnival on the Hill was held on 3 September 2011 and attracted more than 1,000 visitors, including the Mayor of Gateshead and BBC local weatherman Paul Mooney.

== Transport ==
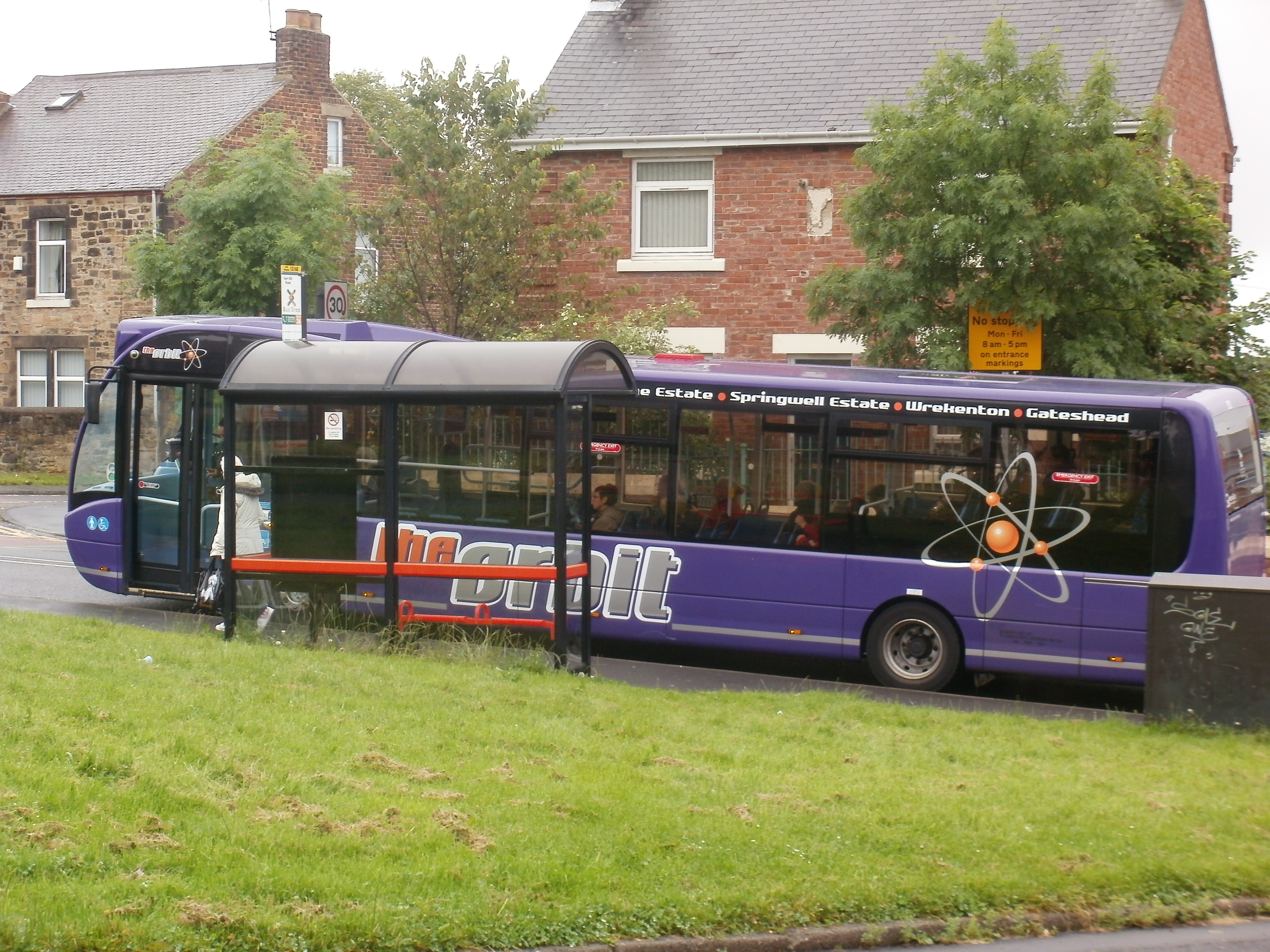
A Go North East Optare Versa, branded in the former Orbit livery, seen on Carr Hill Road, operating service 52 to Gateshead.

The principal roads in Carr Hill are Carr Hill Road to the south, Coldwell Lane in the east, and Nursery Lane, which bisects the suburb centrally.

Journey time by road to Gateshead is around 10 minutes, and around 15 minutes to central Newcastle upon Tyne. Residents have a comparatively low level of car ownership (46.9%), when compared to the borough average of 56.8%. Some 27.3% of residents travel to work by public transport.

Carr Hill is mainly served by Go North East's Quaylink Q1 and Q2, with buses running up to every 15 minutes to destinations including Felling, Gateshead, Leam Lane Estate and Wrekenton. Go North East's 67 service also provides an hourly service to Metrocentre and Queen Elizabeth Hospital.

The nearest Tyne and Wear Metro stations are located at Felling, with the nearest National Rail station being Heworth. The nearest airport is Newcastle International Airport, which is located around 7.5 miles (12.1 km) away.

== Education ==
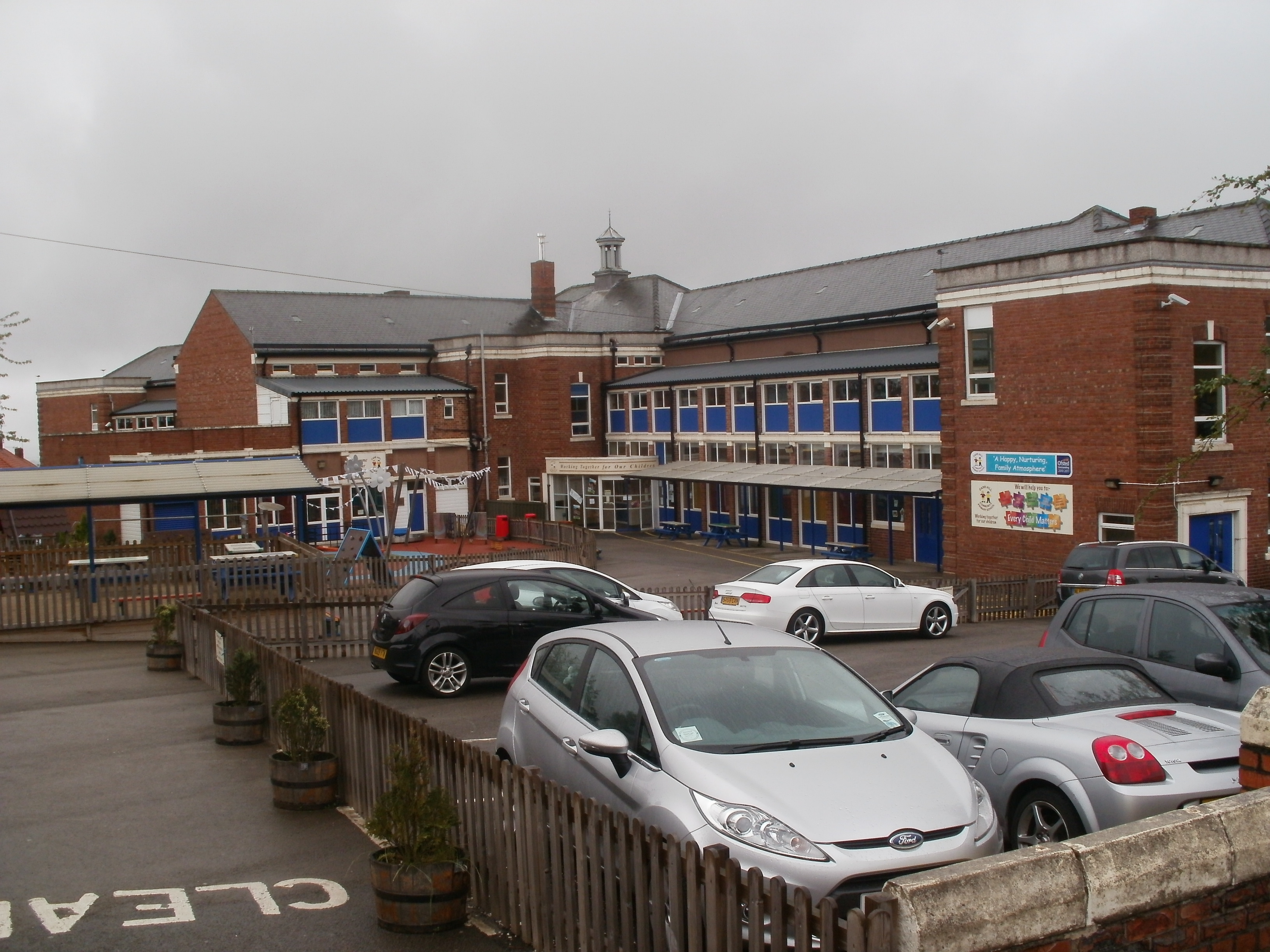
Carr Hill Community Primary School

Carr Hill Community Primary School, at the western end of Carr Hill on Carr Hill Road, caters for pupils in the 3–11 age range. It is a larger than average school where almost two-thirds of the pupils are eligible for schools meals, well above the national average. The school has made steady and sustained improvement; in 2008 an OFSTED inspection found the school to be "good" and in 2010 the school was rated 'outstanding', with excellent teaching and leadership noted and praised. Carr Hill Primary is the only school in the suburb, after Elgin Secondary Technical School, built in 1962, was closed in the 1990s.

Carr Hill compares unfavourably with the wider Gateshead area in respect of adults with educational qualifications. 43.5% of adults have no educational qualifications, compared to 38.4% across the whole of Gateshead and the England average of 28.9%. Only 30.4% of adults have five or more GCSEs or equivalent at A*–C (compared to 36.9% across Gateshead and 47.6% nationally) whilst 13.4% of adults in the suburb have two or more A-Level's or equivalent.

== Religion ==
According to the 2001 UK census, 78.9% of Carr Hill residents identify themselves as Christian. This is marginally less than the regional average of 80.1% but is higher than the national figure of 71.7%. About 0.1% of residents identify as Buddhist, slightly fewer as Sikh, 0.4% as Muslim, and around 0.2% with another unstated religion. No residents identified themselves as Jewish or Hindu. The percentage of residents who have "no religion" is 13.6%; 6.7% of residents did not state any religion. (Note: All figure are averages across Lower Layer Super Output Areas Gateshead 011C and 012D per the 2001 UK Census. Gateshead Council does not provide specific data.)

=== Our Lady of the Annunciation Church ===
Built in 1950, this modern, Roman Catholic church was located at Millway, and was the only place of worship in the suburb. It was also a social hub, hosting regular events such as Christmas fairs. In 2009 however, parish priest David Taylor was arrested in connection with a number of indecent assaults on young boys in his care and was suspended from his joint parish of St Peter's, Low Fell and the Annunciation. Taylor admitted five charges at Durham Crown Court in 2009 and was given a prison sentence. On 20 April 2012, a final mass was held by the Bishop of Hexham and Newcastle and the church was closed. As of 2012 the building remains standing, although property company GVA are inviting tenders for the church and adjoining land.

== Bibliography ==
=== Academic and other texts ===
- Carlton, Ian Clark (1974). A Short History of Gateshead. Gateshead Corporation. ISBN 0-901273-04-X.
- Douglas (1840). Local collections; or, Records of remarkable events, connected with the borough of Gateshead, Volume 1. William Douglas.
- Douglas (1852). Local collections; or, Records of remarkable events, connected with the borough of Gateshead, Volume 1. William Douglas.
- Fordyce, William (1857). The History and Antiquities of the County Palatine of Durham: Volume 2. Fullerton and Co.
- MacKenzie, Eneas (1827). Historical Account of Newcastle-upon-Tyne: Including the Borough of Gateshead. McKenzie and Dent. ISBN 1-144-29746-X.
- MacKenzie and Ross (1834). An Historical, Topographical and Descriptive View of the County Palatine of Durham. McKenzie and Ross. ISBN 1-150-79679-0.
- Manders, Francis William David (1973). A History of Gateshead. Gateshead Corporation. ISBN 0-901273-02-3.
- Proctor, Brian (2006). Carr Hill Notes: Part One. Gateshead Libraries.
- Surtees, Robert (1820). 'Parish of Jarrow', The History and Antiquities of the County Palatine of Durham: volume 2: Chester ward (1820).
- Rogerson & Tuckford (1858). The Farmers Magazine. Rogerson & Tuckford.
- Sykes, John (1833). Local records or, Historical register of remarkable events, which have occurred in Northumberland and Durham, Newcastle upon Tyne, and Berwick upon Tweed, from the earliest period of authentic record, to the present time; with biographical notices of deceased persons of talent, eccentricity, and longevity, Volume 2. John Sykes.
- Whellan, William (1856). Whellan's History, Topography and Directory of Northumberland. Whellan & Co, Manchester.

=== Journals, reports, papers and other sources ===
Where an abbreviation is used in the references this is indicated below in (brackets) at the end of the source name. When a source is available online, a link has been included.

- Bailey, Marion (2007). "Route 26 Community Project Annual Report 2006–2007" (PDF). Route 26 Community Project.
- Bradshaw, Gavin (2011). "Central Area News (Issue 22)" (PDF). Gateshead Council.
- Bradshaw, Gavin (2011). "Central Area News (Christmas Issue)" (PDF). Gateshead Council. Archived from the original (PDF) on 5 March 2016.
- Bradshaw, Gavin (2011). "Central Area News (Issue 21)" (PDF). Gateshead Council. Archived from the original (PDF) on 5 October 2011.
- Gater, Carol (7–8 July 2008). "Inspection Report – Carr Hill Community Primary School" (PDF). OFSTED. Archived from the original (PDF) on 9 November 2011.
- Glover, Amber (15 July 2011). "Two men injured in knife attacks in Deckham". Newcastle Evening Chronicle.
- GVA Grimley (February 2006). "Deckham – Neighbourhood Profile Supporting Document" (PDF). Gateshead Council. Archived from the original (PDF) on 31 August 2012. (NPSD)
- GVA Grimley (March 2006). "Urban Design, Heritage, & Character Analysis Report– Deckham" (PDF). Gateshead Council. Archived from the original (PDF) on 31 August 2012. (UDHC)
- Hickman, Bredna (11 December 2008). "Parish priest arrested over child sex abuse". Newcastle Evening Chronicle.
- Hutchinson, Anneliese (31 December 2010). "Certificate of Refusal of Planning Permission" (PDF). Gateshead Council.
- Mckay, Neil (3 April 2009). "Catholic priest Fr David Taylor admits abusing boys". Newcastle journal. Archived from the original on 18 September 2009.
- Morgan, Bryn (2001). General Election Results– June 7, 2001. House of Commons.
- Mullen, Tom (16 June 2010). "Memorial to honour fallen Tyneside soldier". Newcastle Evening Chronicle.
- Mullen, Tom (8 January 2011). "Pals face beard challenge in honour of Mark Turner". Newcastle Evening Chronicle.
- Petts, Clive (8–9 November 2010). "Inspection Report – Carr Hill Community Primary School" (PDF). OFSTED.
- Quinn, Derek (8 September 2009). "Report to Cabinet, 8 September 2009: Tenders and Scheme and Estimate". Gateshead Council. Archived from the original on 3 October 2011.
- Whellans, Margaret (2012). "Admission to Secondary School 2012" (PDF). Gateshead Council. Archived from the original (PDF) on 4 October 2011.
- Unknown (2008). "Achieving Excellent Outcomes in Sheriff Hill– Children and Young People" (PDF). Gateshead Council. Archived from the original (PDF) on 31 August 2012. (CYP)
- Unknown (2011). "Grant and Award Applications– 2011". Gateshead Council. Archived from the original on 2 October 2011. (GAA)
- Unknown (2008). "Achieving Excellent Outcomes in Sheriff Hill– Economy, Housing and Transport" (PDF). Gateshead Council. Archived from the original (PDF) on 31 August 2012. (EHT)
- Unknown (2008). "GC13- Character Assessment, Carr Hill Estate" (PDF). Gateshead Council. Archived from the original (PDF) on 30 August 2012. (GC13)
- Unknown (2008). "Neighbourhood Profile Central– Sheriff Hill" (PDF). Gateshead Council. Archived from the original (PDF) on 31 August 2012. (NPE)
- Unknown (2012). "Project Pentagon public houses for sale" (PDF). Christie and Co. Archived from the original (PDF) on 17 June 2012. (Pentagon)
- Unknown (2012). "Ward Factsheet – Deckham" (PDF). Gateshead Council. Archived from the original (PDF) on 30 August 2012. (WFS)
