= Marie Wilson =

Marie Wilson may refer to:

- Marie Wilson (American actress) (1916–1972), American radio, film, and television actress
- Marie Wilson (soap opera actress) (born 1974), Canadian actress known for her roles on Port Charles and As the World Turns
- Marie Wilson (painter) (1922–2017), American surrealist painter
- Marie C. Wilson (active since 1978), feminist, author and political activist in the United States
- Mari Wilson (born 1954), English pop singer of the 1980s
- Marie Wilson (Australian singer) (born 1974), Australian singer-songwriter, featured on Twisted Angel and A Wonderful Life
- Marie Wilson (journalist), Canadian 21st century journalist and commissioner of the Truth and Reconciliation Commission of Canada
- N. Marie Wilson (born c. 1979), Indian politician

== See also ==
- Mary Wilson (disambiguation)
