= Windy Nook =

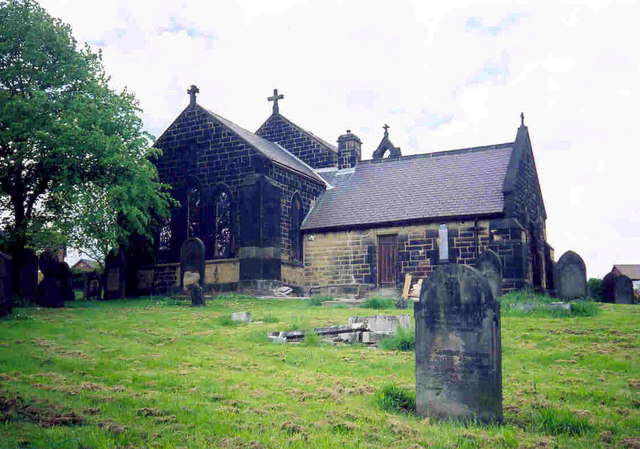
- The Church of St Alban's, Windy Nook Road

- Location within Tyne and Wear
- Population: 3,165 (2011)
- OS grid reference: NZ2760
- Metropolitan borough: Gateshead
- Metropolitan county: Tyne and Wear
- Region: North East
- Country: England
- Sovereign state: United Kingdom
- Post town: GATESHEAD
- Postcode district: NE10
- Dialling code: 0191
- Police: Northumbria
- Fire: Tyne and Wear
- Ambulance: North East
- UK Parliament: Jarrow and Gateshead East

Windy Nook is an area in Tyne and Wear, England, bordered by Carr Hill to the west, Whitehills Estate and Leam Lane Estate to the east, Felling to the north and Sheriff Hill to the south. It lies on steep, sloping land 2.25 miles (3.62 km) south of Gateshead, 2.75 miles (4.43 km) south of Newcastle upon Tyne and 12 miles (19 km) north of Durham. In 2011, the Windy Nook and Whitehills ward had a population of 9,781. Formerly part of Heworth, it was incorporated into the newly formed Metropolitan Borough of Gateshead on 1 April 1974.

Windy Nook has a long industrial history, with evidence of milling and pottery in the area. The principal industry, however, was stone quarrying, and the initial settlement grew as this industry flourished. By the turn of the 19th century, several quarries operated in Windy Nook and the largest, Kell's Quarry, provided the sandstone and grindstone used to build St Alban's Church, a Grade II listed building and principal landmark in the village, which was consecrated on 25 August 1842.

The decline in industry in the 20th century saw the population fall to pre-industrial levels. Though today an urban suburb, there are no large commercial areas and the new Tesco store is the largest employer. There remains large areas of green space, however, and it is a popular and high-demand place to live. Residents compare favourably with others in the borough in terms of income, employment levels and educational qualifications.

Windy Nook Nature Reserve is a protected wildlife area, as well as one of the largest environmental sculptures in Europe. Mary Elizabeth Wilson, a serial killer, was known as The Merry Widow of Windy Nook. Joseph Hopper, founder of the aged mineworkers scheme, and John Oxberry, a prominent historian, also hailed from the village.

== History ==
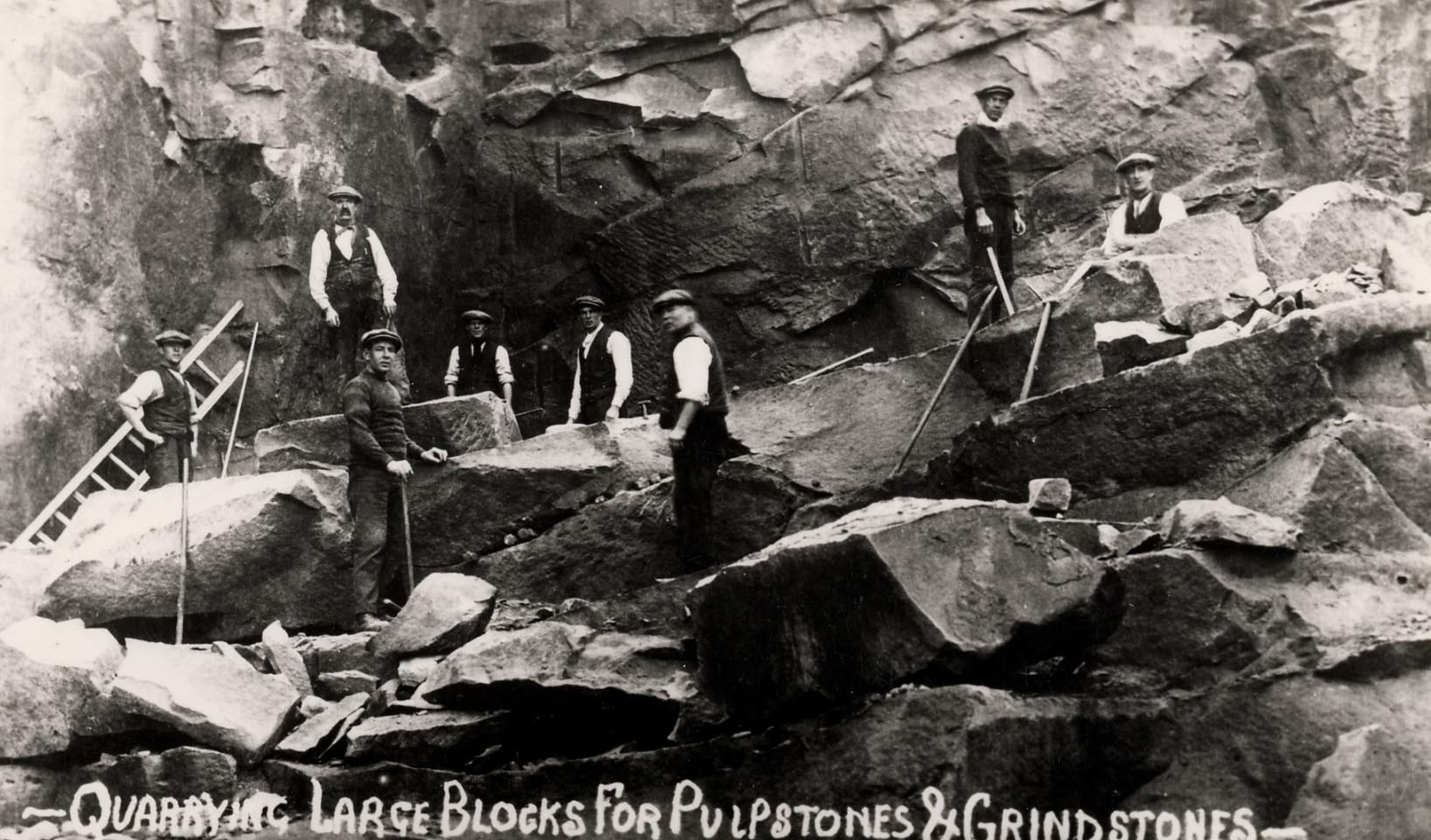
Quarrymen working at Kell's Quarry. Photograph courtesy of Gateshead Council public archives

The name Windy Nook derives from "the lofty and exposed nature of the situation it occupies". In 1784, Richard Kell began quarrying at Heworth Shore. His business expanded quickly and, by the turn of the 19th century, Kell and his family had established a second quarry at Windy Nook which was known as Kell's Quarry. This, along with a number of pre-existing, smaller quarries, provided work for the early settlers and by 1820 there existed a "modern but populous village". The quarries of Windy Nook became renowned, described as equally important to the more vaunted quarries of Yorkshire and producing sandstone and 'Newcastle grindstone' of sufficient quality that stones from Kell's Quarry were used to build St Alban's Church and other local buildings.

As the quarries prospered, the village continued to grow. In 1834 an account described Windy Nook as "a populous hamlet ... chiefly inhabited by workmen employed in the adjoining quarries. Here are three public houses, one farmstead, a corn-mill and several mechanics". In 1842, a National school was built by subscription, and within six years the building of two more mills and a pottery saw the population increase to around 2,009 inhabitants. The quarries continued to produce high quality grindstone; in 1860 stone from Kell's Quarry was used to build the Exchange Building in Newcastle upon Tyne.

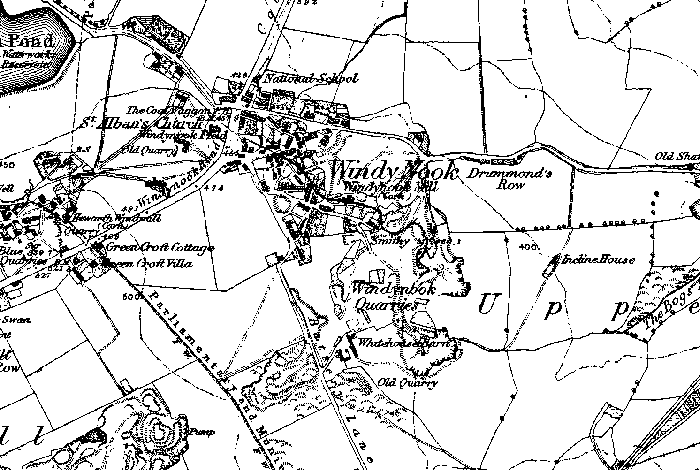
Ordnance Survey map of Windy Nook in 1862

In spite of this industrialisation, residents were still able to enjoy "wildly romantic scenery". Ordnance survey maps of 1862 show that Windy Nook remained isolated from the neighbouring villages at Carr Hill and Sheriff Hill. The principal road, Windy Nook Road, had been established and at the junction between this road and Carr Hill Road, the church of St Alban and the national school are evidenced among a cluster of residential dwellings but there was little else save the quarries which dominated during those formative years. By 1870 there were 430 houses for 2,653 inhabitants which by 1887 had increased again to 3,554.

However, by the turn of the 20th century, the quarries slowly fell into disuse and by the 1960s all of the remaining industrial areas had closed and the quarries infilled, though the sandstone properties at St Alban's Place and Co-Operative Terrace stand as a reminder to Windy Nook's industrial history. The decrease in employment opportunities led to a steady decline in population and although some housing developed along Stone Street and Coldwell Lane, the urban sprawl that enveloped most of the outlying settlements of Gateshead during the early 20th century never reached Windy Nook, so that in 1945 it remained largely unchanged in location and size. Despite some terraced housing being built in at Crossfield Park and Coltsfoot Gardens in the 1970–80s, the character of the suburb today remains suburban; the land is split 50/50 between residential properties and open green space and only 11.3% of the residential properties today are council housing. The result is that Windy Nook is a high-demand area for privately owned and social housing.

== Economy ==
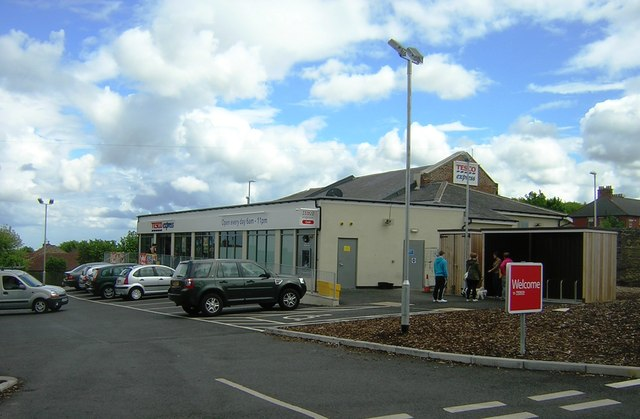
The Tesco Express store at the site of the former Black House Inn opened in 2012.

The decline of heavy industry in the 20th century left Windy Nook with no major employer and there was little in terms of economic activity. There is no major commercial area and residents usually travel to neighbouring Felling town centre to shop or use the small shopping area at the junction of Windy Nook Road and Carr Hill Road/Albion Street. However, in November 2011, planning permission was approved for conversion of the Black House Inn at the junction of Carr Hill Road and Coldwell lane into a Tesco Express store. The approval was granted in spite of complaints and concerns as to noise and traffic being raised by local residents. This store is now the largest employer in Windy Nook, employing around 20 staff.

Overall, Windy Nook is wholly outside the lowest 20% of residents in terms of income in Gateshead. The unemployment rate in the Windy Nook and Whitehills Ward measured by those who claim Jobseeker's Allowance is 5%, which is the same as the overall Gateshead average, whilst youth unemployment is 10%. The average income of residents in the ward is £23,000 per annum. (Note: These figures includes the nearby Whitehills estate; a large council estate to the east. Independent figures for Windy Nook are not available. Figures taken from WFS, 2012: 2–3) Some 4.4% of residents are self-employed, which compares with a 4.5% borough average.

== Geography and topography ==
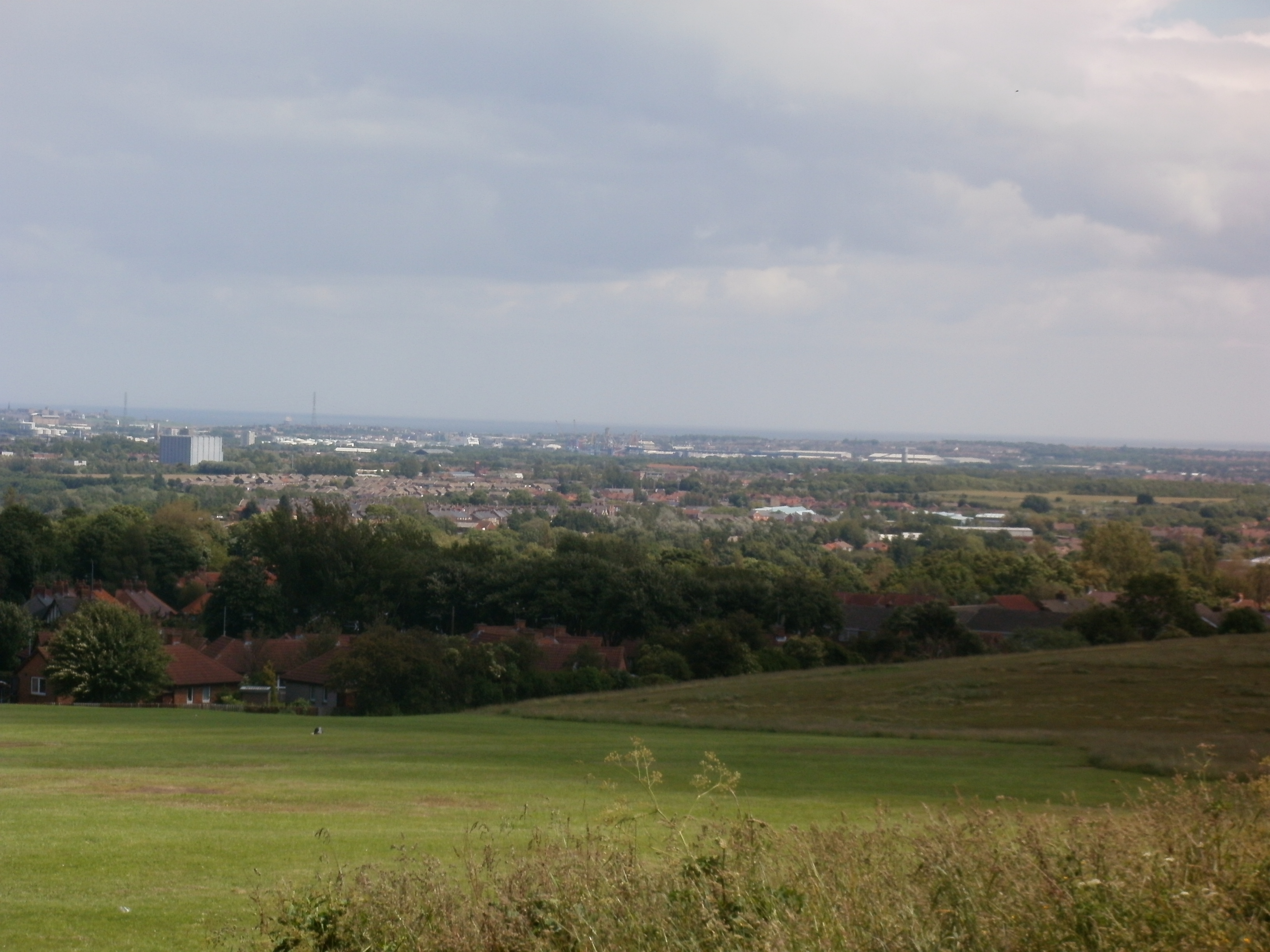
View east from Albion Street demonstrating the open fields of the area and the steepness of the land comparative to Tyneside.

At latitude 54.938° N and longitude 1.5703° W, Windy Nook lies 2.25 miles (3.62 km) south-east of Gateshead and 255 miles (410 km) from London. It sits on a bed of coal, freestone and sandstone known locally as the "Grindstone Post" and occupies an elevated position with a steep slope running from north to south to a maximum natural height of 160 metres (520 ft) above sea-level. This distinctive, steep topography provides residents with "fantastic" views; especially to the north and in some places panoramic views across the Team Valley in the west and towards the North Sea in the east. Around 50% of the land is green space; a combination of urban green space, natural fields, wildlife corridors and a nature reserve. These combine to improve the quality and feel of the area.

Official documents indicate that the boundaries of Windy Nook are Albion Road in the north, Windy Nook Road to the west, Stone Street and the adjoining streets to the south and the Fiddler's Three public house to the east. Windy Nook was part of County Durham until it was incorporated into the Metropolitan Borough of Gateshead by the Local Government Act 1972. It is now bordered by settlements which are also part of the metropolitan borough. These are Sheriff Hill to the south, Carr Hill to the west, Felling to the north, Whitehills Estate and Leam Lane Estate to the east.

== Demography ==
Windy Nook compared (2001)
	Windy Nook	Gateshead	England
Total population	2,628 (Note: Figure is cumulative total of Lower Layer Super Output Areas Gateshead 018A and 018B per the 2001 UK Census. Gateshead Council records the combined population of Windy Nook and Staneway to be 5,576 (at NPE, 2008: 8) but does not provide separate population figures for the two areas. All other data is, however, provided separately and is specific to Windy Nook.)	191,151	49,138,831
White	99.1%	98.4%	90.9%
BME	0.9%	1.6%	4.6%
Aged 0–19	23.9%	24.2%	26.32%
Aged 65+	13.8%	17.3%	15.9%
Male	48%	48.3%	48.7%
Female	52%	51.7%	51.3%

According to the United Kingdom Census 2001, Windy Nook has a population of 2,628 – 52% of the population are female, slightly above the national average, whilst 48% are male. Less than 1% of the population are from a black or other minority ethnic group (BME), as opposed to 9.1% of the national population.

Windy Nook has a low proportion of lone parent households at some 7.2% of all households. This is one of the lowest figures in Gateshead and compares with a borough average of 11.5%. Some 31.1% of households have dependent children, as opposed to 29.5% nationally and 28.4% in Gateshead. The Index of Multiple Deprivation, which divides England into 32,482 areas and measures quality of life to indicate deprivation, splits Windy Nook into halves and lists the eastern half in the top 20% of all deprived areas in England in 2011. The western half is not considered deprived.

In 2011, Windy Nook had a population of 3,165, compared with 9,781 for the Windy Nook and Whitehills.

Windy Nook compared 2011	Windy Nook	Windy Nook (with Whitehills and Staneway)
White British	96.2%	97.1%
Asian	1.5%	0.9%
Black	0.3%	0.2%

In 2011, only 3.8% of Windy Nook's population were non-white British, compared with 2.9% for the ward of Windy Nook and Whitehills and 8.0% for the town of Gateshead. The amount of Ethnic Minorities resident in Windy Nook is low compared with other Gateshead districts like Felling, Deckham and Saltwell.

=== Population change ===
The population of Windy Nook rose steadily through the 19th century but decreased as industry declined and is now at the lowest level since 1842.

Population change in Windy Nook 1842–2001
Year	1842	1870	1887	2001
Population	2,009	2,653	3,554	2,628

== Governance ==
Gateshead Council, Windy Nook & Whitehills 2012 local elections
Candidate name	Political party	Number of votes	% of votes cast
Pat Ronan	Labour	1,963	82.8%
Kyle Murray	Conservative	228	9.6%
Lisa Angela Marie Bradbury	Liberal Democrats	179	7.56%

Windy Nook was initially an ecclesiastical district in the parish of Jarrow, but after the Local Government Act 1972, it is today wholly within the council ward of Windy Nook and Whitehills in the Metropolitan Borough of Gateshead and is approximately 2.9 square kilometres (1.1 sq mi) in area. It is represented by three councillors. In June 2012, they were Jim Turnbull, Tom Graham and Rachel Hart.

Windy Nook is part of the Westminster parliamentary constituency of Gateshead. It was previously in the Gateshead East and Washington West constituency which was abolished by boundary changes before the 2010 UK General Election. For many years the MP was Joyce Quin, who retired on 11 AGateshead. He replaced Sharon Hodgson who successfully campaigned in the newly formed constituency of Washington and Sunderland West. In the 2010 UK General Election, Mearns was elected with a majority of 12,549 over Frank Hindle. The swing from Labour to the Liberal Democrats was 3.9%.

Windy Nook is in a safe Labour seat. Osborne's success in 2024 followed of Ian Mearns, who in the 2005 UK General Election polled over 60% of the votes cast whilst in 2001, Joyce Quin was returned with a majority of 53.3%.

== Education ==
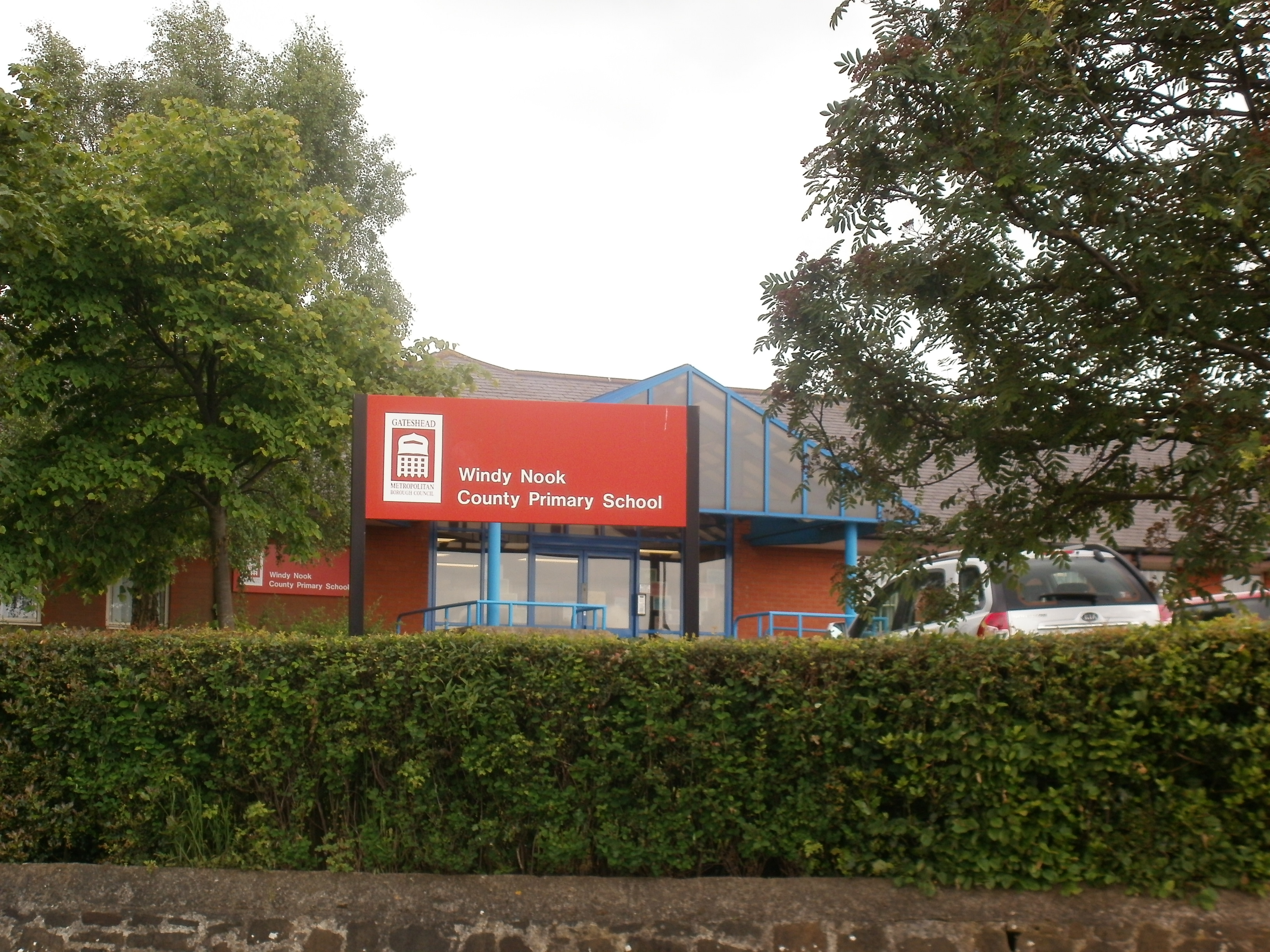
Entrance to Windy Nook Primary School

Windy Nook Primary school is at Albion Street and caters for students aged between 3 and 11 years. It is a much larger than average-sized school though the number of students eligible for free school means is below average. The standard of provision is declining; in 2001 the school was named by OFSTED as one of the most successful schools in England but subsequent inspections have seen the school's rating decline so that in the most recent inspection the school was rated as satisfactory overall, with inconsistent levels of attainment and teaching noted since Principal Lucie Forrest was appointed as head.

Windy Nook Primary is the only school in the village. Some children of primary school age attend Colegate Community Primary School, located on the fringe of Windy Nook at Colegate West in neighbouring Leam Lane. This too is a satisfactory school which suffers from inconsistent attainment among pupils. The nearest Roman Catholic school is St Augustine's Primary; a good school at Leam Lane Estate.

Children in Windy Nook achieve better than average results at Key Stages two and three compared to the overall borough average. Approximately 66% of children leave secondary school with 5 or more A*–C grade GCSEs, which is higher than the national and Gateshead averages (59% and 58% respectively), though overall the total number of residents holding those qualifications is 36.5%. Only 17.4% of residents hold 2 or more A-Levels, as compared to local average of 18.4% and a national average of 28.2%.

== Culture and religion ==
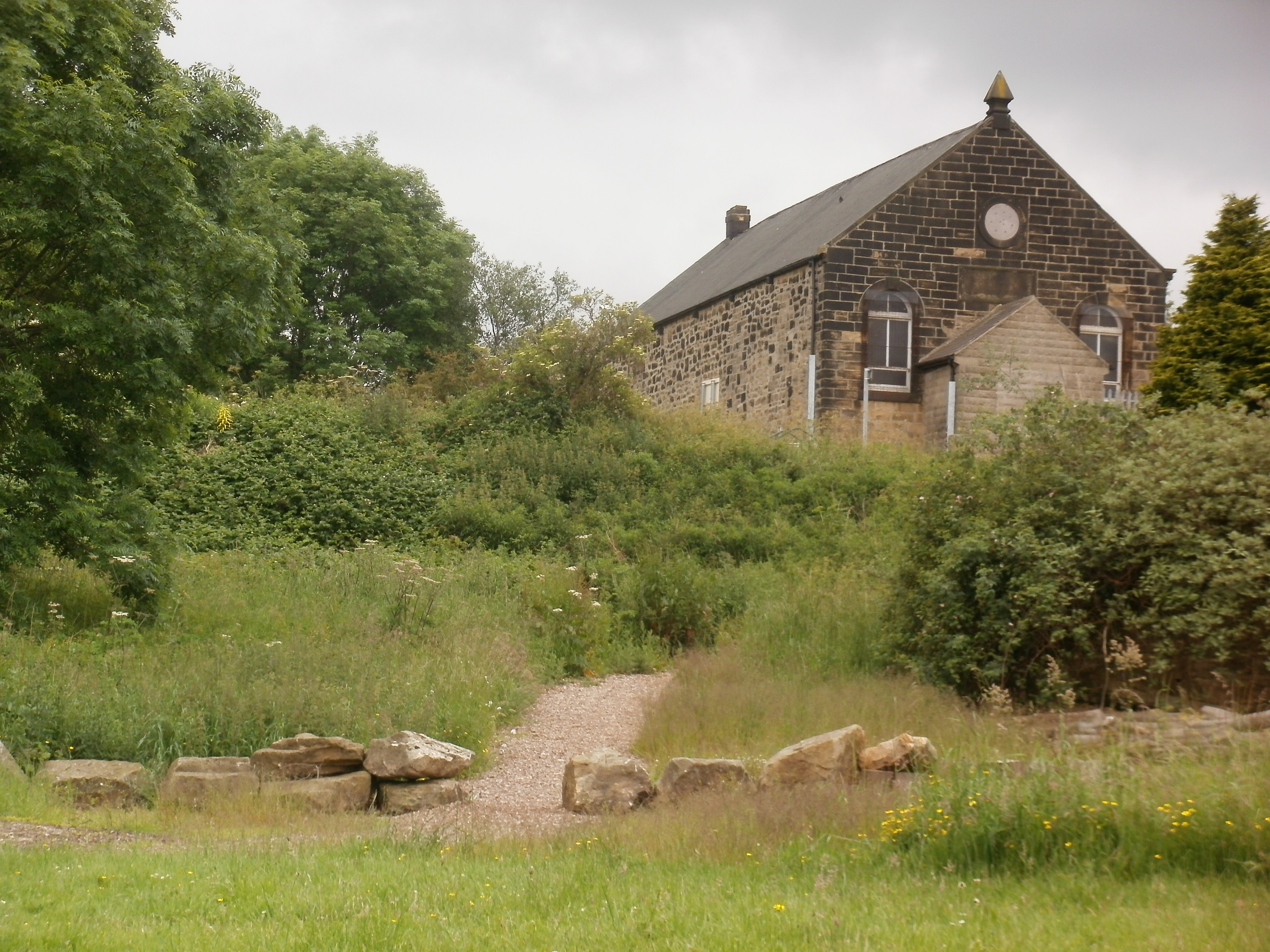
Ebenezer Chapel today

Windy Nook has two Grade II listed buildings.

The Church of St Alban was designed by Thomas Liddell, the son of a Tory politician, and built between 1841 and 1842. The completed building cost £880 and was consecrated on 25 August 1842 by the Bishop of Durham in attendance with 36 local clergy. Built in locally quarried sandstone and named for the first martyr of the Anglican Church, St Alban's is a "neat structure in the early English style" with a Welsh slate roof and "satisfactory interior and decoration". The church was extended in 1888 and is today a Grade II listed building. The gates, gate piers and overthrows, also designed by Liddell and built at the same time as the church, are tall sandstone structures with wrought iron adornments. These are also Grade II listed buildings.

In addition, the residential properties at 1–10 East View Terrace were locally listed by Gateshead Council as buildings of special interest in 2004. At the same panel hearing, the committee elected not to list the Ebenezer Chapel, a Methodist chapel at Stone Street. A New Connexion chapel is evidenced in Windy Nook in 1855 though the chapel at Stone Street was opened in 1865; one year later than the "beautiful little Gothic church" opened by the Primitive Methodists at Albion Street at a cost of £340. The New Connexion amalgamated with the Primitive Methodists in 1942 and services were held in Ebenezer until 1963 while the Albion Street chapel hosted Sunday School. By 1976, a new building was erected alongside the old chapel and that new building still stands as the Windy Nook Methodist Church.

== Places of interest ==
=== Venues ===
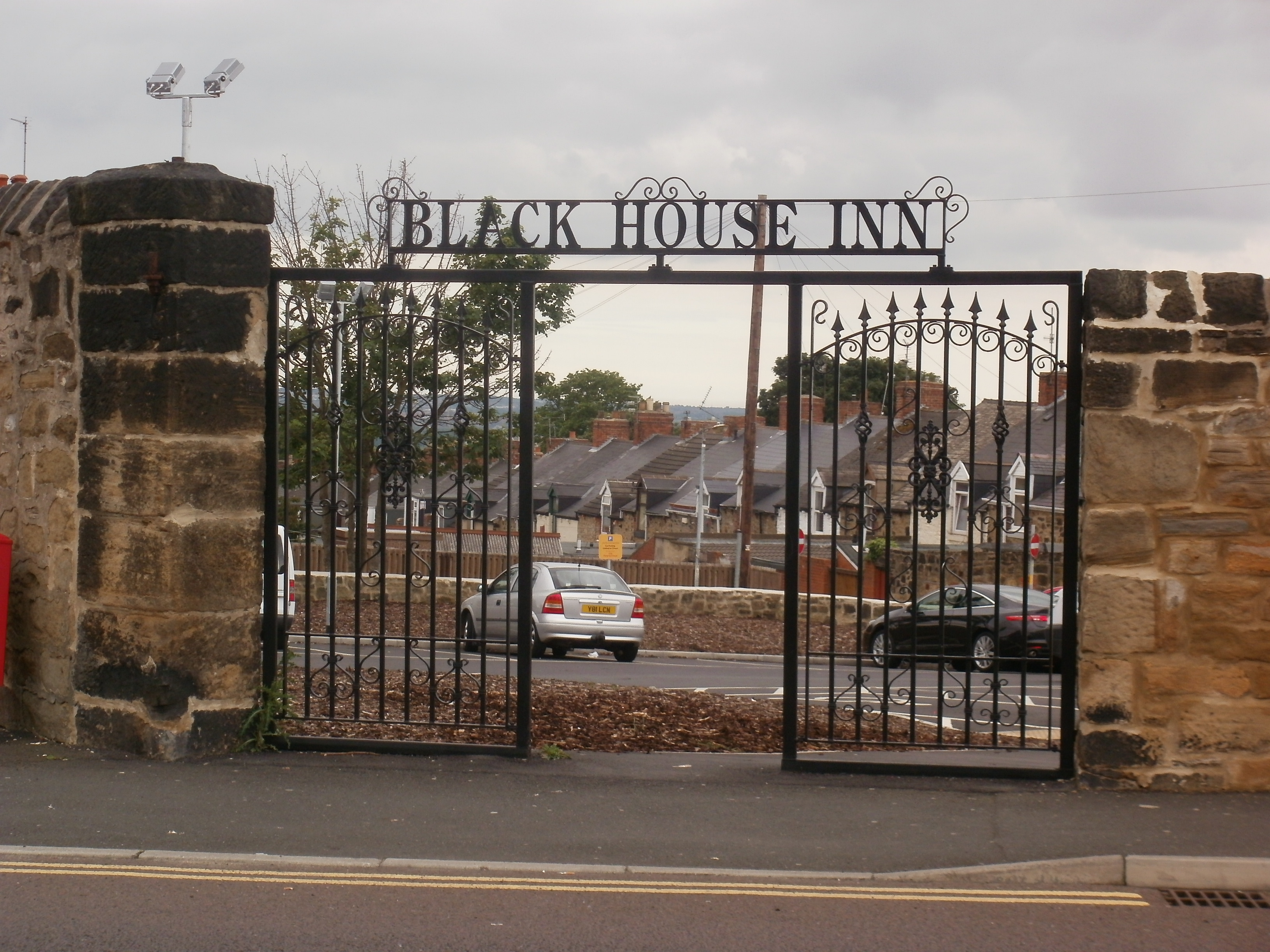
The last remnants of the Black House Inn

There are three venues in Windy Nook. Planning permission was sought on 20 June 2003 to renovate and reopen the near derelict Windy Nook Social Club at Stone Street. Approval was granted and Sutherlands Hotel was opened later that year. Run by Helen Sutherland, today the hotel is a thriving venue which in December 2010 successfully applied for certification allowing marriage and civil partnerships to be performed in the upper 'Tree-House Suite'.

Other venues are the Bay Horse, an older stone building at the corner of East Street and Stone Street, which has a conservatory, catering facilities and large car park. Whilst open for business, the Bay Horse is currently available for long-term lease. The Fiddlers Three public house, located at Albion Street, is another older stone building with modern catering facilities. The Black House Inn, evidenced as the Coal Waggon Inn on ordnance survey maps in 1862 at the junction of Carr Hill Road and Co-operative Terrace, was partially demolished in 2011 to make way for a Tesco Extra store.

=== 'The Windy Nook' ===
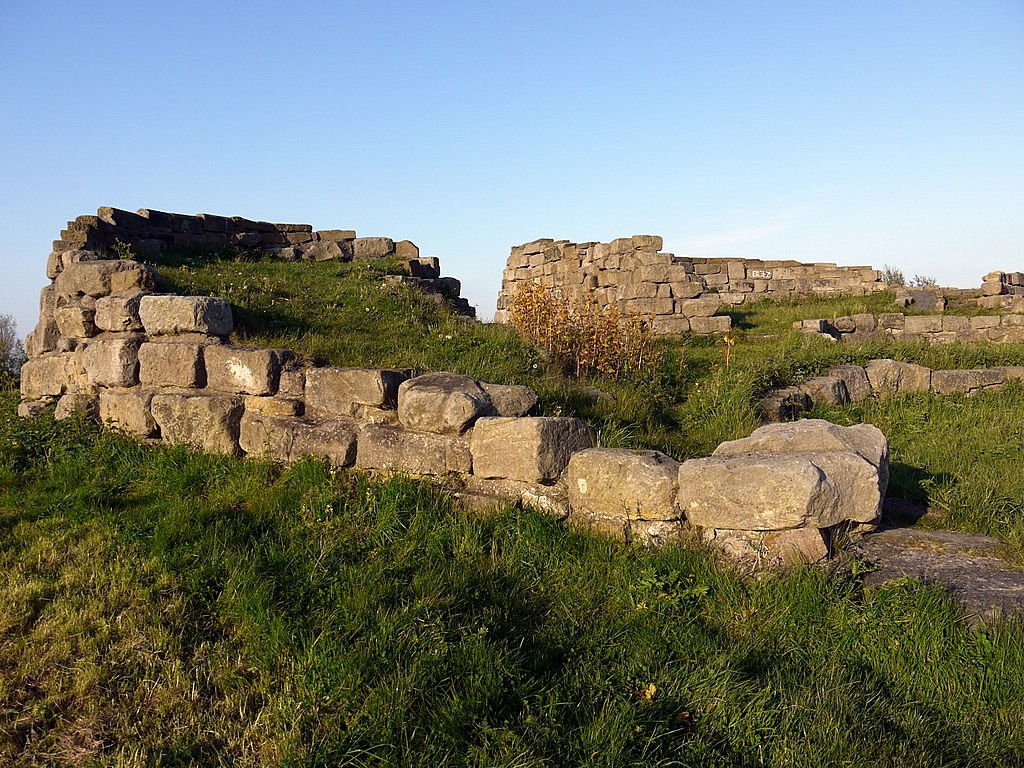
Cole's The Windy Nook

'The Windy Nook' is the title of a local landmark created by sculptor Richard Cole at the back of the Whitehills Estate on Whitehill Drive. The sculpture appears at first glance to be an old fortification of interlinked walls and pathways sitting atop Windy Nook Pit Hill; local children refer to the artwork simply as 'the Fortress' In fact, the hill is a former slag heap and the 'ruins' are made from 2,500 tons of granite blocks salvaged from the old Scotswood Bridge. It was unveiled in 1986 during Gateshead Sculpture Week.

Today, the 'Windy Nook' is a popular installation much used for walking and recreation and which is some 180 metres (590 ft) in height and covers 5,500 square metres (59,000 sq ft) in area. It remains one of the largest environmental sculptures in Europe. As it has matured it has become home to various plant- and animal life and is now considered an ordinary part of the landscape.

=== Windy Nook Nature Reserve ===
Windy Nook Nature Park was opened in 1981 and is at the north west corner of Windy Nook. It is a collaborative enterprise between local conservation volunteers and Gateshead Council, seeking to turn two hectares of unattractive wasteland into an urban nature park. Many of the trees were planted by local school children and today the reserve is a large open space offering the same panoramic views as most other parts of the area, with acid-heath grassland, scrub woodland and a small spring-fed pond. The reserve is also a Site of Nature Conservation Importance (SNCI). In 2007, Gateshead Council invested £100,000 into the reserve from their 'Safer, Stronger Communities Fund' to make improvements to an area which had become "blighted by misuse". The money led to the removal of a BMX track within the reserve, the installation of an extensive footpath network, improved access points and gating and the planting of more trees. Woodland thinning has also been undertaken.

Recent budget cuts by Gateshead Council have seen the local authority transfer the management of the park to the community, despite a local petition raised in protest. The reserve remains popular with residents; in May 2012 dozens of volunteers cleared rubbish and engaged in a 'Windy Nook Wildlife Festival' with face-painting and other traditional activities. Local police continue to make 'targeted patrols' of the reserve to maintain the downward trend of anti-social behaviour in the area. In November 2012 a 'green gym' was opened at the reserve. This saw fitness equipment installed in clusters of three and four machines which is available for use by the public free of charge. This is one of only two such outdoor public gyms in Gateshead, the other being opened simultaneously at Saltwell Park.

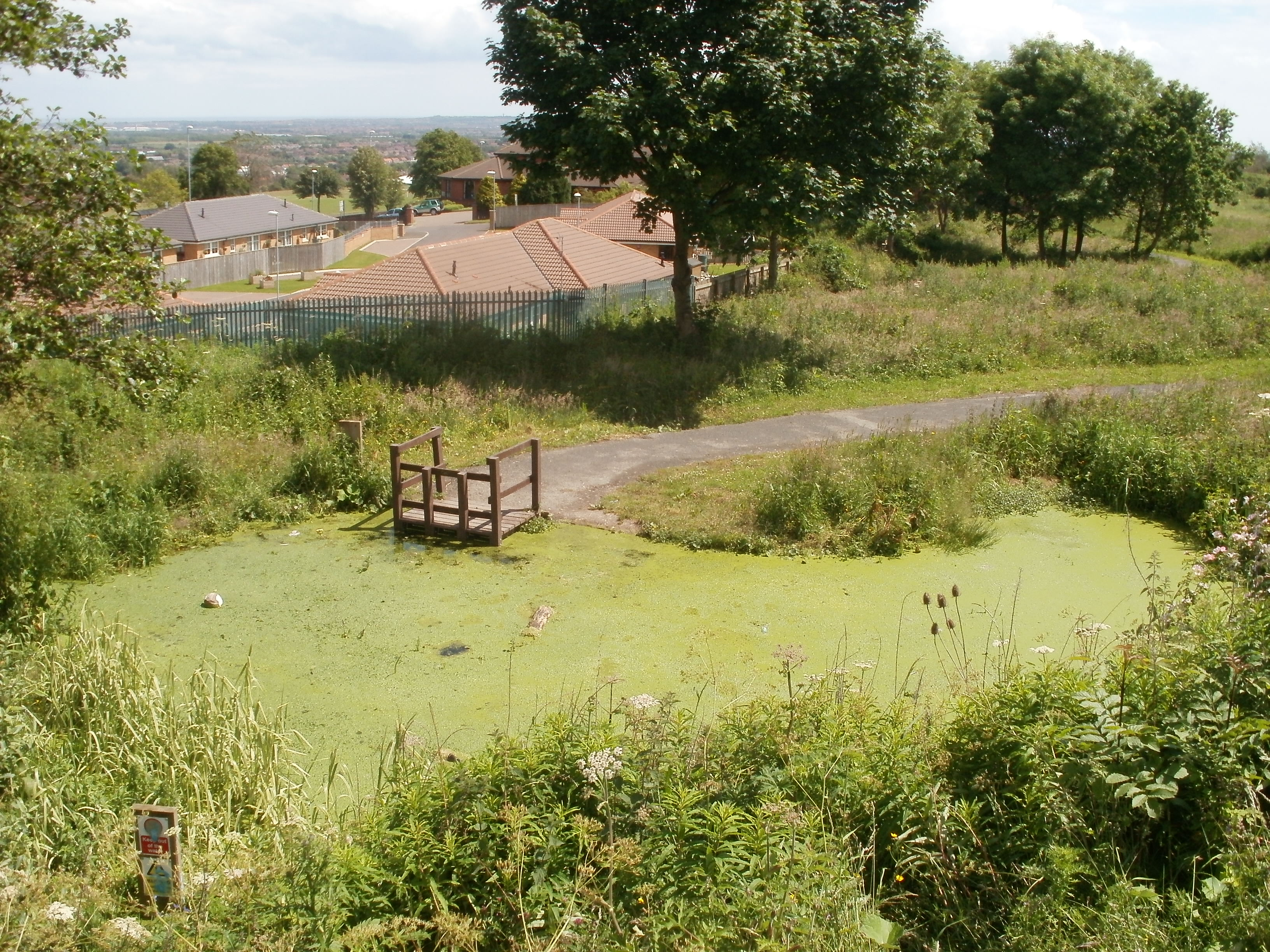
The spring-fed pond at Windy Nook Nature Reserve.

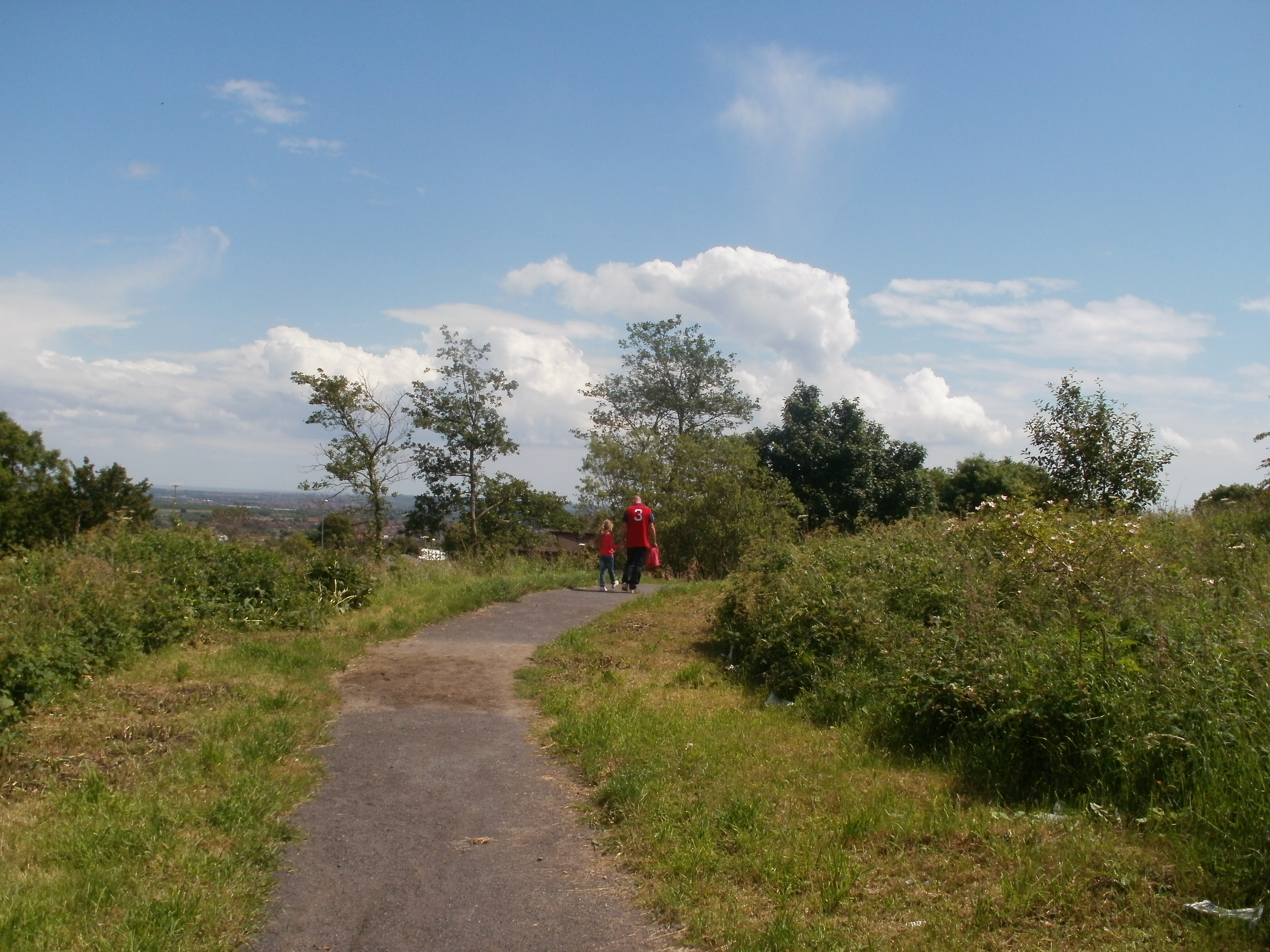
A man and young girl wander through the nature reserve.

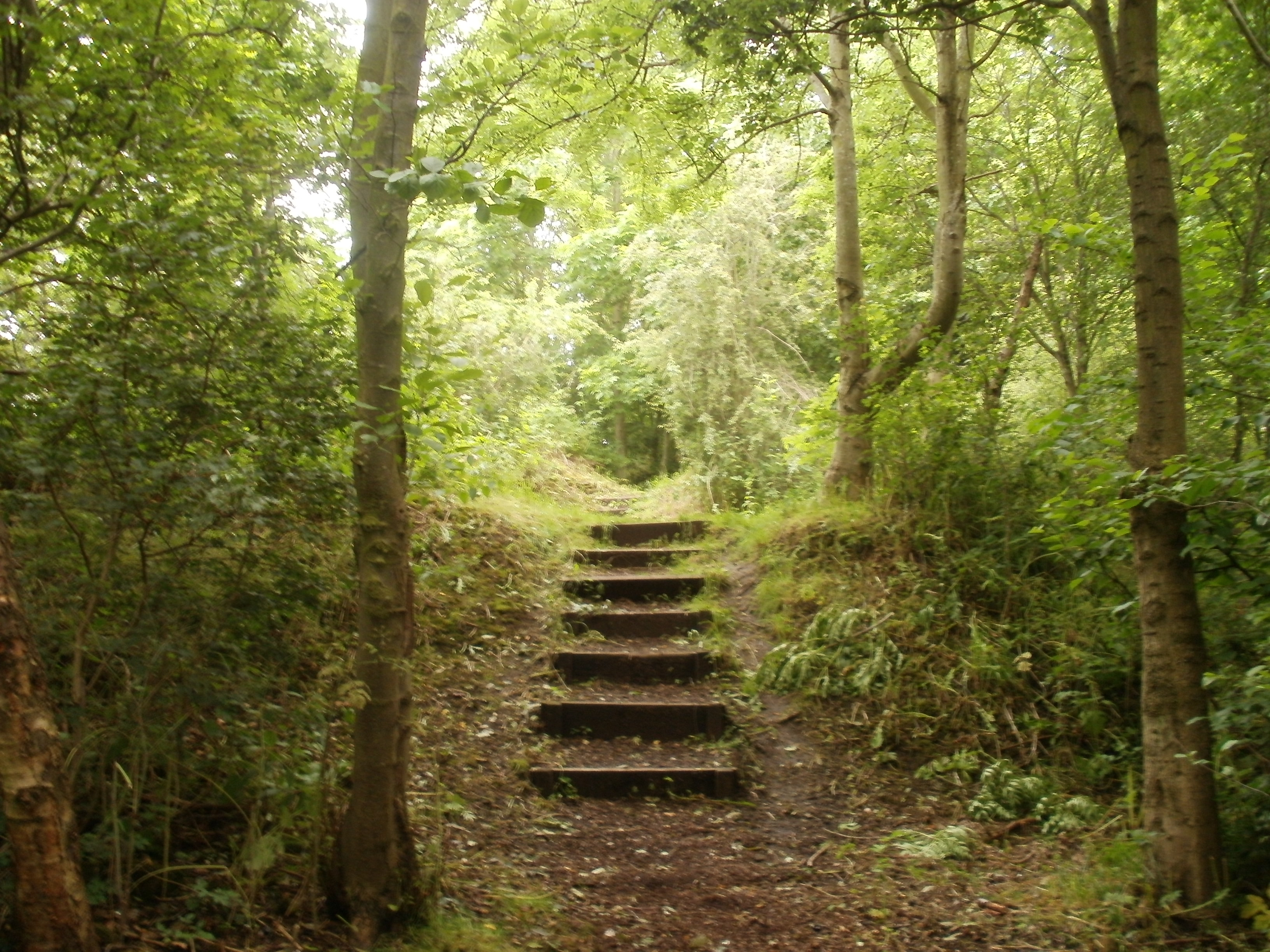
Some wooden steps lead to an elevated section of woodland.

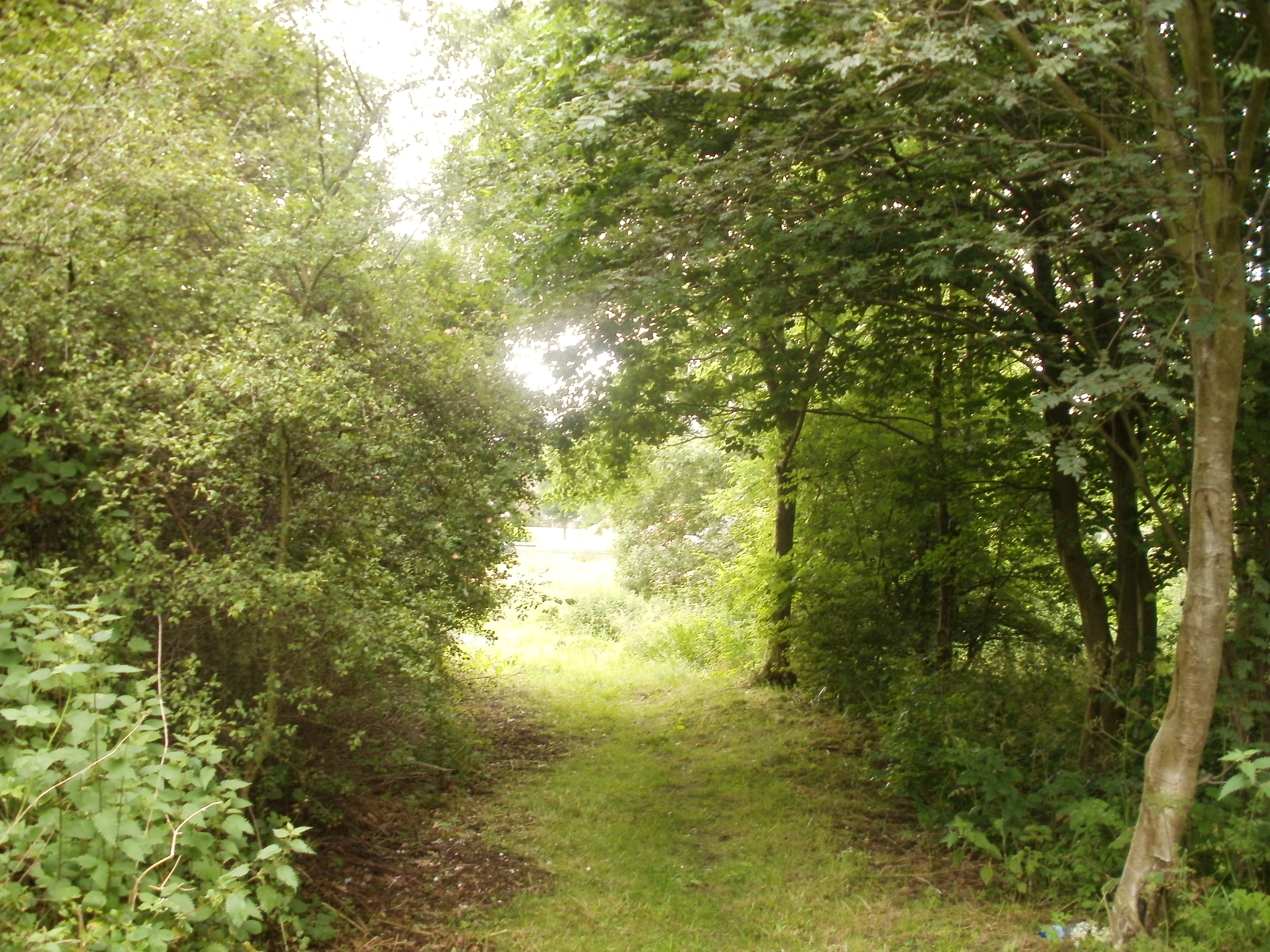
Trees act as a natural gateway to woodland in Windy Nook Nature Park.

== Notable residents ==
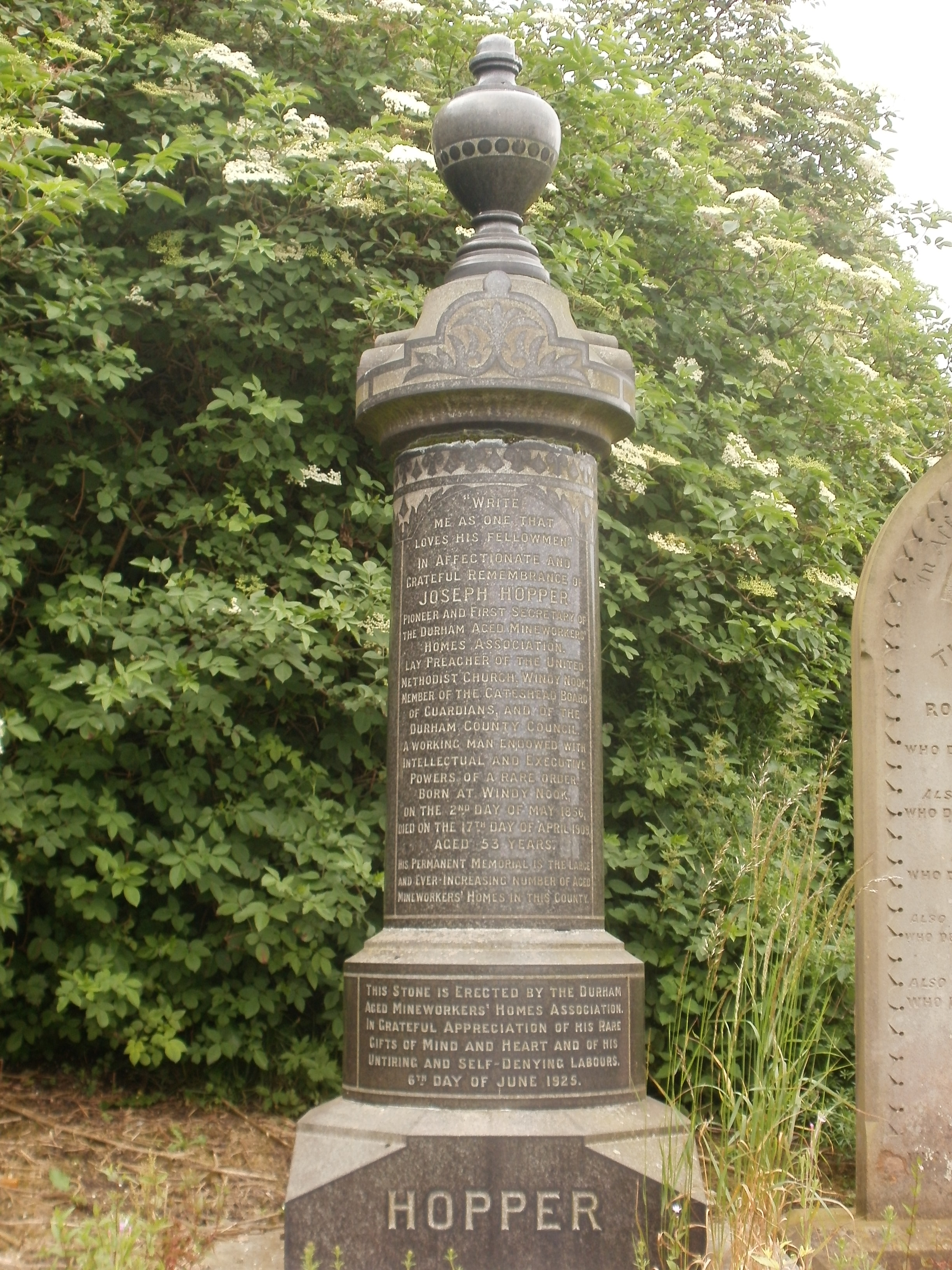
Memorial to Joseph Hopper at St Alban's Church

Joseph Hopper was a local councillor and Methodist preacher who lived in Windy Nook and was the creator of the 'aged mineworkers home scheme' in 1898 which provided housing for miners who had retired and were no longer eligible for tenure by dint of their employment. The organisation he created, the Durham Aged Mineworkers Homes Association, is today a registered charity which owns around 1,500 properties and had a turnover in 2012 of over six million pounds. A celebration of Hopper's work was produced after his death by John Oxberry, who was himself born in Windy Nook, in 1924. Oxberry, born in 1857, was a renowned local historian who traveled to New Zealand but returned to publish various texts, including Windy Nook Village; its inhabitants and their Co-operative store, and served a variety of roles on Gateshead Council with sufficient distinction that he was made a Freeman of Gateshead in 1937. Oxberry died three years later.

Arguably the most notable resident, however, is Mary Elizabeth Wilson; a serial killer who achieved worldwide notoriety as the "Merry Widow of Windy Nook". Wilson was born in Hebburn but lived with her first husband John Knowles, along with her lover, John Russell in the same house at Windy Nook for 43 years. Knowles died in 1955 and she married Russell five months later. He died two years later and both were attributed to natural causes. Wilson remarried again but her third marriage, to Oliver Leonard, lasted just twelve days and he died leaving £50 to his wife in his will. A short time later, Wilson married for a fourth time to Ernest Wilson. At her wedding reception, Wilson joked to a guest that the sandwiches left over could be saved for the funeral. When Ernest died soon after, Wilson joked with the funeral director that she should be offered a trade discount for all of the trade she passed his way. Local residents heard of these comment and began speculating as to the spate of deaths, so that Police eventually exhumed Oliver Leonard and Ernest Wilson in 1958 and found traces of phosphorus caused by rat poison. Despite claiming that sexual stimulation pills were the source of the phosphorus, Wilson was convicted of both murders at Leeds in 1958 and sentenced to hang at Durham; the last woman to be so sentenced. Due to her age, her execution was commuted to a life sentence, and she died in Holloway prison in 1962. A later exhumation of her first two husbands also resulted in phosphorus being found, but Wilson died before she could be tried again.

== Transport ==
The principal roads in Windy Nook are Albion Road and Windy Nook Road, however several housing developments in the area lack cohesive road links, with many streets leading to dead ends.

Journey time by car or bus to Gateshead is about 10 minutes, and 15 minutes to Newcastle upon Tyne. Residents have a comparatively high level of car ownership – 71% as compared to a borough average of 56.8%.

The nearest Tyne and Wear Metro station is Felling, with Heworth and Newcastle being the nearest National Rail stations.

Windy Nook is served by Go North East's local bus services, with routes providing frequent connections to Gateshead, Newcastle upon Tyne and Metrocentre.

== Bibliography ==
=== Texts and academic sources ===
- Antliff, W (1864). the Primitive Methodist Magazine. Richard Davies, London.
- Bailey, Brian (1988). Almshouses of England and Wales. Robert Hale Ltd. ISBN 0-7090-3292-7.
- Bartholomew, John (1887). Gazetteer of the British Isles.
- Cox, Charles (July 1842 – June 1843). The Ecclesiastical Gazette or Monthly Register of the Affairs of the Church of England and of its Religious Societies and Institutions. Bodleian Library Society.
- Lewis, Samuel (1831). A Topographical Dictionary of England. Lewis & Co. ISBN 0-8063-1508-3.
- Lewis, Samuel (1848). A Topographical Dictionary of England. Lewis & Co. ISBN 0-521-42864-5.
- Oxberry, John (1924). Gateshead District Aged Mine-Workers' Homes. The birth of the movement. A tribute to the memory of Joseph Hopper, etc. With illustrations, including a portrait. unknown. ASIN B0017ATZ80.
- Oxberry, John (1924). Windy Nook; its inhabitants and their Co-Operative Store: a jubilee tribute and historical sketch 1874–1924. Co-operative Wholesale Society's Printing Works. ASIN B00088H804.
- MacKenzie and Ross (1834). An Historical, Topographical and Descriptive View of the County Palatine of Durham. McKenzie and Ross. ISBN 1-150-79679-0.
- Pevsner, Nikolaus (1983). The Buildings of England–County Durham. Yale University Press. ISBN 0-300-09599-6.
- Surtees, Robert (1820). The History and Antiquities of the county Palatine of Durham: vol.2, Chester ward. London Institute of Historical Research.
- Watson, J (1911). British and Foreign Building Stone. Institute of Civil Engineers. ISBN 978-0-7277-5068-6.
- Whellan, William (1855). Whellan's History, Topography and Directory of Northumberland. Whellan & Co, Manchester.
- Wilson, John (1870–72). Imperial Gazetteer of England and Wales. Fullarton & Co.

=== Journals, reports and other sources ===
Where an abbreviation is used in the references this is indicated below in (brackets) at the end of the source name. When a source is available online, a link has been included.

- Barker, Mike (14 December 2010). Application for Approved Premises Status – Sutherlands The Venue, Gateshead. Gateshead Council.
- Davies, Katie (3 September 2011). "Fears new Windy Nook Tesco will cause chaos". Newcastle Evening Chronicle.
- Davies, Katie (15 February 2012). "Gateshead countryside cuts spark protest". Newcastle Evening Chronicle.
- Dowling, Paul (9 November 2011). Planning and development Committee, Planning applications for consideration. Gateshead Council.
- Lloyd, Chris (19 November 2008). "Brassed off by the cold and back again". The Northern Echo. Archived from the original on 28 September 2012.
- Northern, Lee (15–16 March 2011). "Thomas Hepburn Community Comprehensive School– Inspection Report" (PDF). OFSTED. Archived from the original (PDF) on 4 November 2012.
- Potter, Gordon (21–22 November 2011). "Windy Nook Primary School– Inspection Report" (PDF). OFSTED.
- Pringle, Kate (3–4 November 2010). "Colegate Community Primary School– Inspection Report" (PDF). OFSTED.
- Quinn, David (February 2004). Report to Council- Local Lists of Buildings, and Parks and Gardens of Special Interest. Gateshead Council. Archived from the original on 2 April 2012.
- Robertson, Sarah (28 November 2004). "Cops have last laugh". Sunday Sun.
- Singleton, David (17 October 2003). "Deep Roots" (PDF). Inside Housing.
- Ulyatt, Gianna (6–7 October 2008). "St Augustine's Catholic Primary School and Nursery– Inspection report" (PDF). OFSTED.
- Ward & Shimmin (13 July 2011). Neighbourhood Matters, East Area Forum– Using the Index of Multiple Deprivation (IMD) 2010 and other relevant data to inform the future priorities and work programme of the East Area. Gateshead Council.
- Unknown (2008). "Achieving Excellent Outcomes in Windy Nook and Staneway– Children and Young People" (PDF). Gateshead Council. (CYP)
- Unknown (2008). "Achieving Excellent Outcomes in Windy Nook and Staneway– Economy, Skills, Transport and Housing" (PDF). Gateshead Council. (ESTH)
- Unknown (November 2008). "Neighbourhood Profile East – Windy Nook and Staneway" (PDF). Gateshead Council. (NPE)
- Unknown (25 April 2006). "Report for the Gateshead Strategic Partnership Steering Group". Gateshead Council. Archived from the original on 3 October 2011. (GSP)
- Unknown (17 September 2011). The Lady Killers.
- Unknown (2008). "Urban Character Assessment– GE13" (PDF). Gateshead Council. (GE13)
- Unknown (2012). "Windy Nook and Whitehills- Ward Factsheet" (PDF). Gateshead Council. (WFS)
