= Mary Elizabeth Wilson =

English murderer (1889–1962)

- Born: Mary Elizabeth Cassidy; 11 June 1889; Hebburn, Durham, England
- Died: 5 December 1962 (aged 73); HMP Holloway, London, England
- Other name: Merry Widow of Windy Nook
- Conviction: Capital murder
- Penalty: Death; commuted to life imprisonment

Details
- Victims: 2–4
- Span of crimes: 1955–1957
- Country: England
- Location: County Durham

Mary Elizabeth Wilson (née Cassidy; 11 June 1889 – 5 December 1962), known in media as The Merry Widow of Windy Nook, was an English serial killer and the last woman to be sentenced to death in Britain. She was convicted of capital murder in Durham in 1958. However, the sentence was commuted to a prison sentence due to her advanced age.

== Biography ==
Wilson was born Mary Elizabeth Cassidy on 11 June 1889, in Catchgate, Stanley, County Durham, and christened on 30 June 1889 at Our Blessed Lady and St. Joseph, Brooms, Co. Durham.

She married her first husband John Knowles around November 1914. They settled at a house in Windy Nook, Gateshead. Her lover John Russell eventually moved in with them. In 1955, Knowles died. Five months later she married Russell. He died in 1956 (or early in 1957). The attending physician declared that both men had died of natural causes. Wilson inherited their money, £42.

In June 1957, Wilson married her third husband, Oliver Leonard, a retired estate agent. He died only 12 days into their marriage, leaving her £50. She soon married a fourth husband, Ernest Wilson. His estate included up to £100, a bungalow and life insurance. He died within the year. This time, she did not even bother to attend the funeral.

By this time Wilson had become a figure of local gossip, concerning both the frequency at which her spouses died and her rather cheerful attitude towards the pattern; she had joked at her latest wedding reception that left-over sandwiches would be fresh enough to use at the next funeral. She had also asked for a trade discount from the local undertaker, for providing him with plenty of business. These instances of morbid humour brought her to the attention of the police.

An exhumation of the bodies of her last two husbands revealed high levels of phosphorus. Her defence claimed the substance was contained in their medication. Wilson was convicted of murdering two of her four husbands with beetle poison in 1956 and 1957. The remains of her earlier two husbands were exhumed at a later date and pointed to the same cause of death. There was no reason, however, to have a second trial.

Wilson was sentenced to death but her advanced age allowed her to get a reprieve and her sentence was commuted to life imprisonment. She died of natural causes on 5 December 1962 while incarcerated at HM Holloway Prison.

== In popular culture ==
- Her story was depicted in Deadly Women, on the Investigation Discovery channel as the season 11 premiere episode entitled "Mid Life Murder".

== See also ==
- List of serial killers by country
