= Mary Florence Wilson =

Former librarian for the League of Nations

Mary Florence Wilson (29 January 1884, Lancaster, Pennsylvania – 4 January 1977, La Tour-de-Peilz, Switzerland) was a librarian for the League of Nations, as well as for Columbia University Library.

== Early life ==
Mary Florence Wilson was born on January 29, 1884, in Lancaster, Pennsylvania, the youngest of a large family, the daughter of Colonel William B. Wilson and Sarah Urich. Known to the library world as Florence Wilson, she was a true generalist, interested in everything around her. Wilson was educated at Gibson's College Preparatory School in Philadelphia, and wanted to become a social worker, but due to her delicate health could not obtain permission from her father. She studied at the Drexel Institute the University of Pennsylvania Extension Division, and Columbia University, where she also worked as a librarian. She graduated from the Drexel Institute Library School in 1909, after finally gaining the reluctant consent of her father.

From the date of her graduation until 1917, she was a librarian with Columbia University Library. During those years she was involved in a variety of tasks. She organized the drama and English libraries of Columbia University and the National Committee for Mental Hygiene. She was an instructor in cataloging and classification as well as librarian of the natural science library during the last four years at Columbia. Among her many specialties, she also specialized in international relations.

== Paris Peace Conference ==
In 1917 Wilson participated in the Paris Peace Conference, working as a liaison officer of the American Library Association and the Library of Congress. Following that, in 1918–1919, she became only female member of the American Peace Commission, and only female participant of the conference in general. Her job was taking care of documentation and historical work. Due to the work concerning the conference, she was asked to establish and organize the League of Nations library.

== League of Nations ==
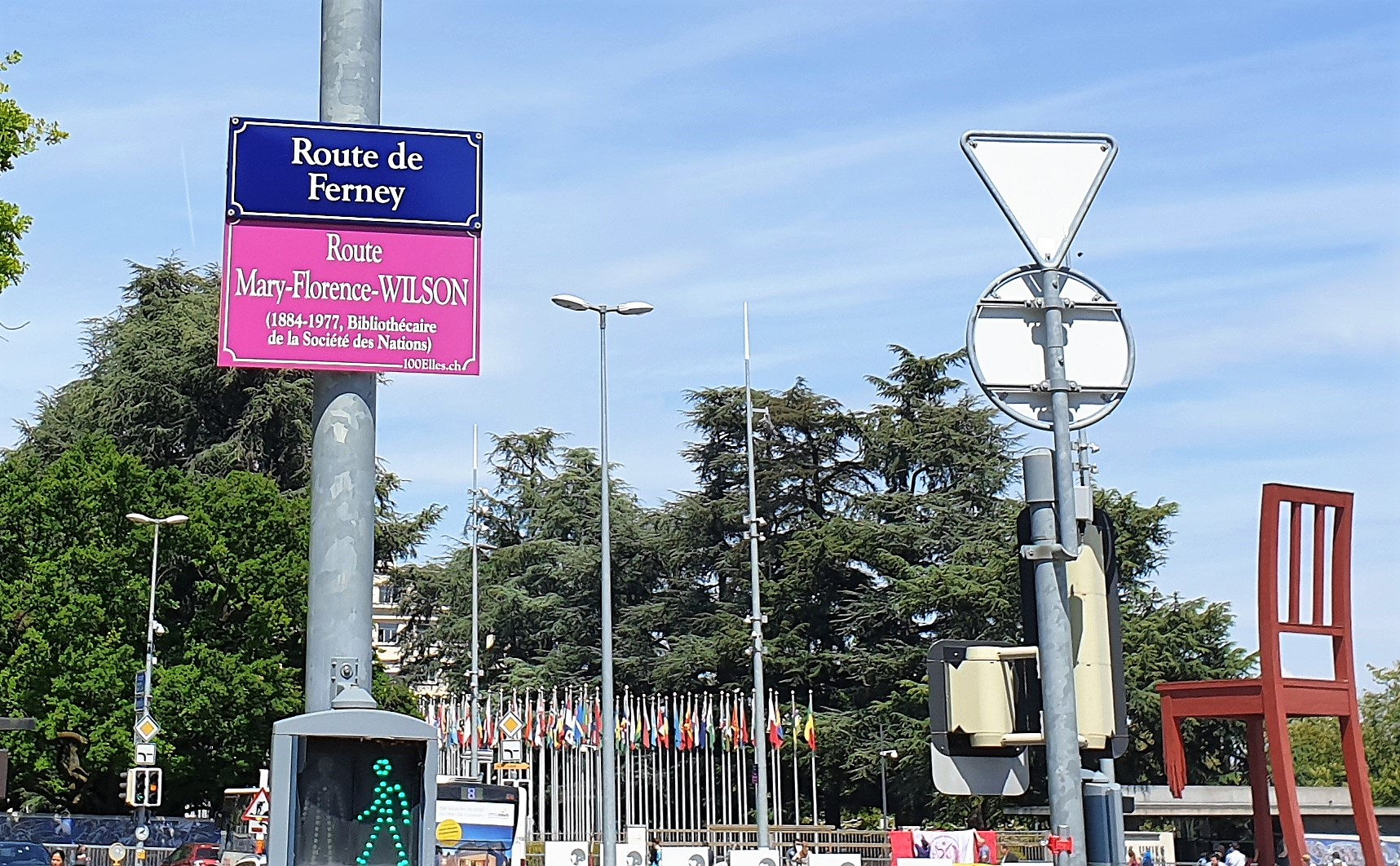
Route Marie-Florence WILSON - Route de Ferney

Due to her work with the American Peace Commission, Wilson was "asked to organize library of the new League of Nations" (p. 110). When she took this position, she was the only "female library director in all of Europe". She worked as Assistant Librarian to the League of Nations (Second Division) from October 1, 1919, to May 31, 1922, at which point she was promoted to Librarian of the League of Nations (First Division), serving there from June 1, 1922, to December 31, 1926.

As Chief of Section, she oversaw a substantial division on the League: between 1921 and 1922, her yearly budget for acquisition of books was $40,000 and she supervised 13 highly qualified librarians. Despite the importance of her position, Wilson's wages comprised less than half of those of her male colleagues. Her role in establishing the organization of the League of Nations Library meant she was responsible for the standardizing text references in a way that was accessible to a large international body. Her initial choice of the American referencing system was challenged by members of the League who favored their own systems of library referencing. After researching multiple European and international libraries, she settled on the Dewey system of referencing, favoring its internationalist appeal for the League.

Wilson had a vision for the League of Nations Library as an accessible resource for League members, utilizing a complete bibliography of documents. Unfortunately, she left her position at the League in 1926, before her vision was fulfilled.

== After the League of Nations ==
After her League of Nations work, Wilson never returned to the libraries, choosing instead to focus on volunteer work, especially after the Second World War, as a part of Americaine de Secours Civil. From 1927 until 1929, she worked as an administrator and consultant for the European Center of the Carnegie Endowment for International Peace, focusing on organization of Endowment's International Mind Alcoves and International Relations Clubs. She was also library advisor for organization's director and American libraries abroad, for example Cairo.

In 1927, she travelled through Egypt, Syria, Turkey and Greece, conducting research on American educational facilities for the European Center of the Carnegie Endowment for International Peace, results of which were published in Near East Educational Survey. As a part of this work, she travelled to Yugoslavia, Romania, Greece and Turkey in 1928, in which year her analysis of the Covenant of the League of Nations and the process of its creation was published.

== Publications ==
- Mary Florence Wilson, The origins of the League Covenant : documentary history of its drafting, London: Leonard and Virginia Woolf, 1928
