= Royal Exeter Hotel =

Hotel in Bournemouth, Dorset, England

Coordinates: 50.71744°N 1.8793°W

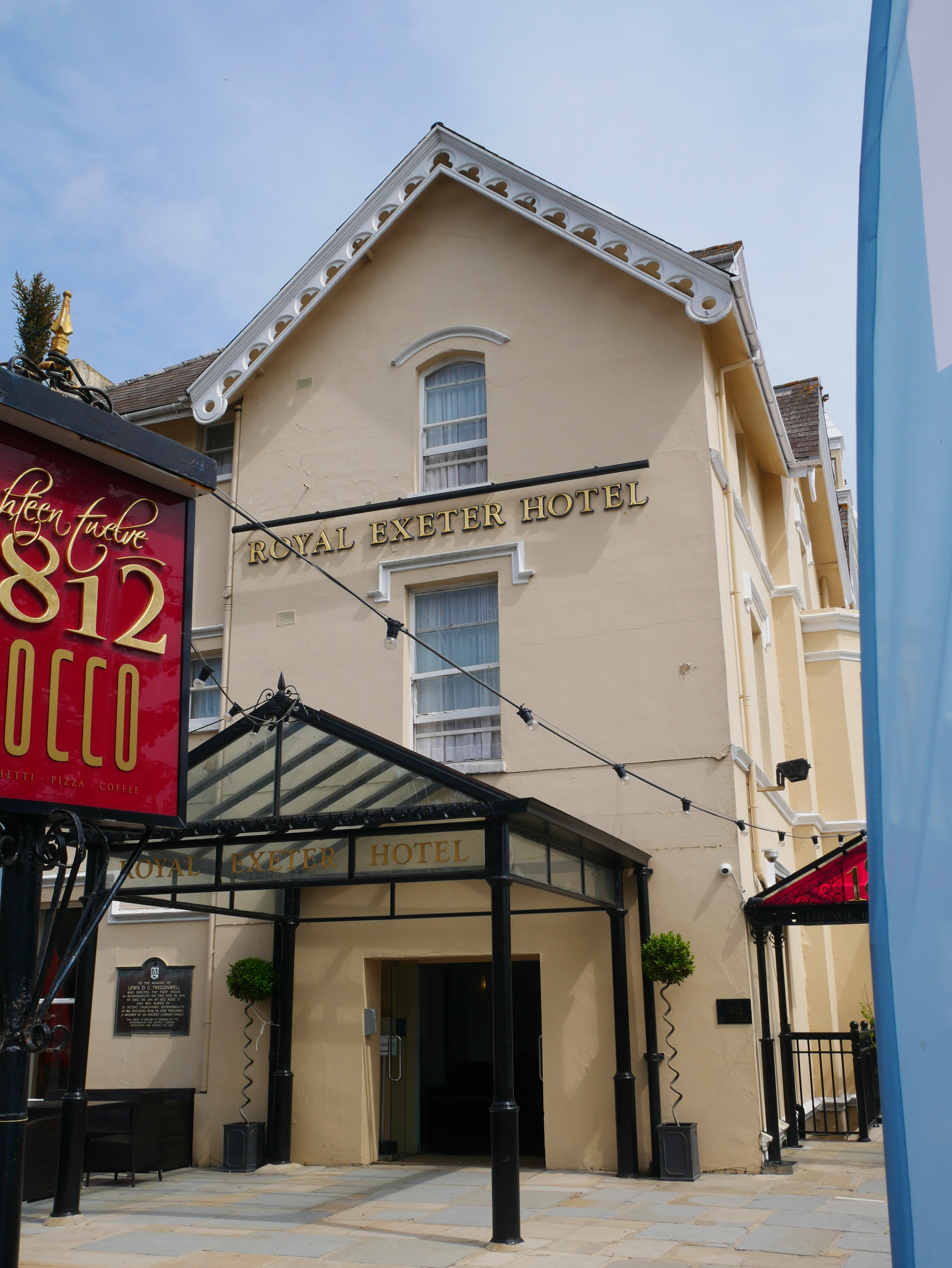
- Interactive map of the Royal Exeter Hotel area

General information
- Location: Bournemouth, United Kingdom

The Royal Exeter Hotel is a Grade II listed building in Bournemouth, Dorset. It stands opposite the Bournemouth International Centre.

== History ==
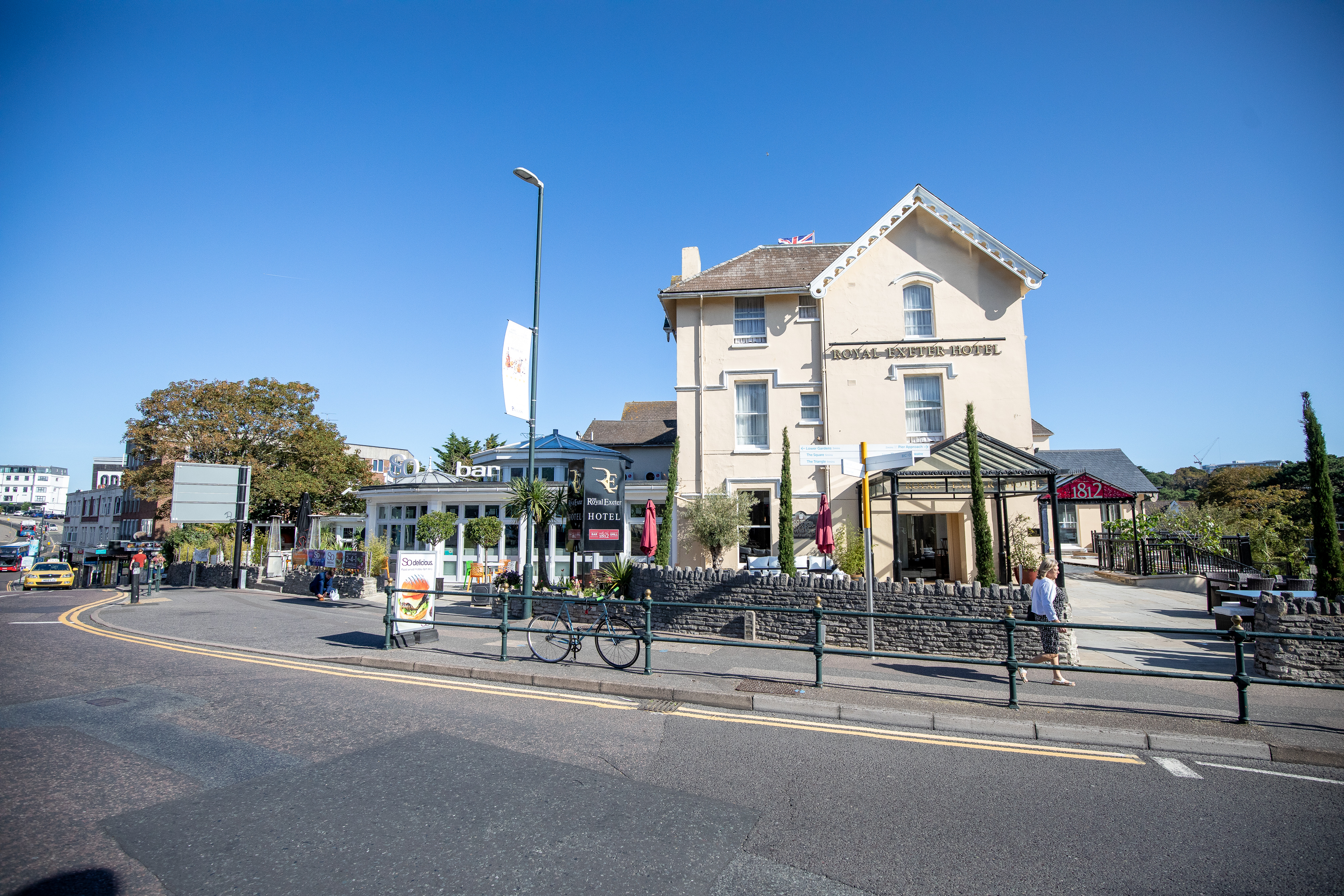
The Royal Exeter Hotel in 2019.

A wing of the hotel was originally built as a house for Lewis Tregonwell, the founder of Bournemouth. In March 2026, an application for a 24 hour alcohol licence was made.
