= Lewis Tregonwell =

British captain (1758–1832)

Lewis Dymoke Grosvenor Tregonwell (/trəˈɡʌnəl/ trə-GUN-əl; 1758–1832) was a captain in the Dorset Yeomanry and a historic figure in the early development of what is now Bournemouth.

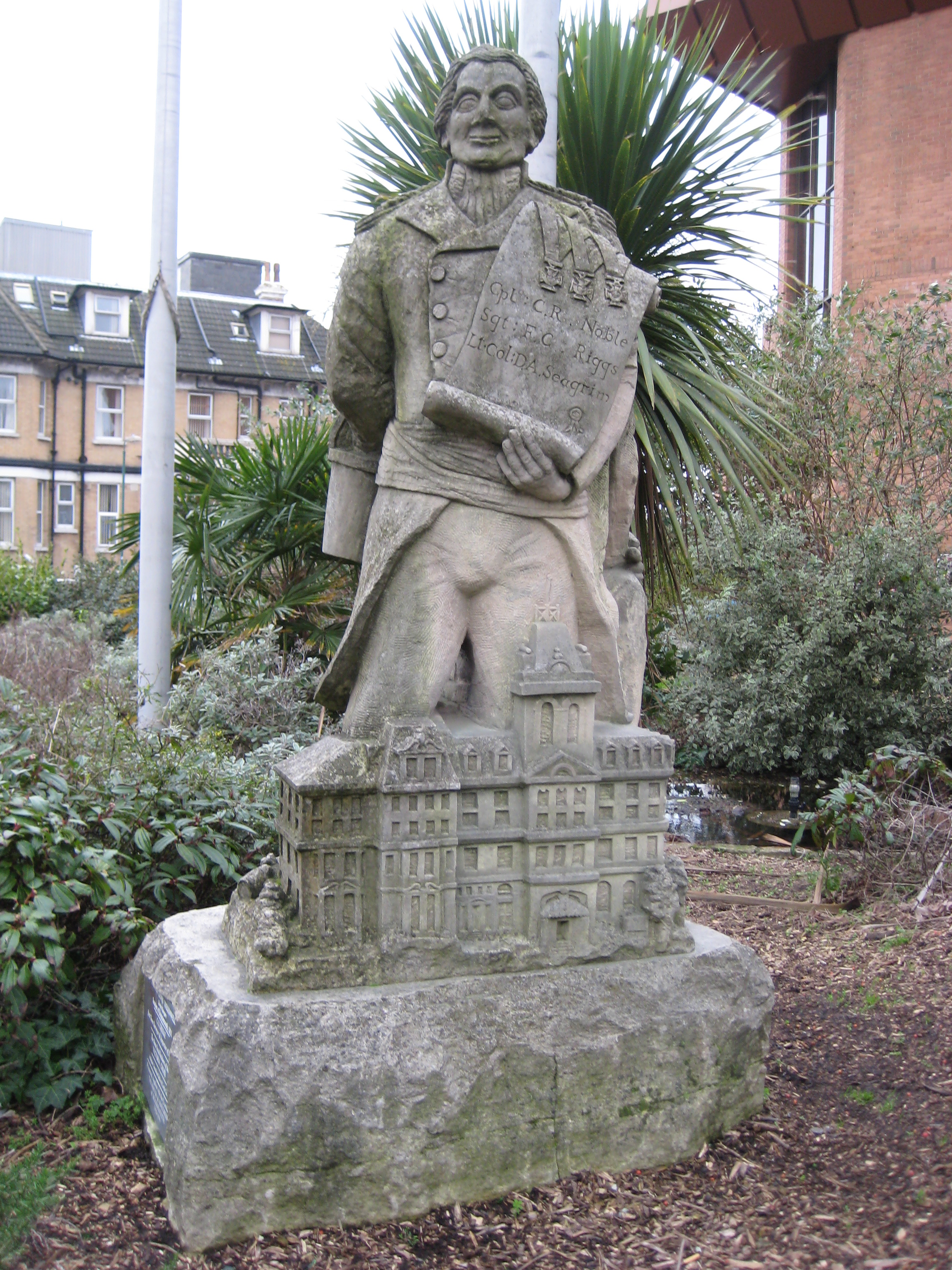
A statue of Tregonwell in the town of Bournemouth, which he founded.

== Early life ==
Born in 1758 in Anderson, Dorset, Tregonwell lived at Cranborne Lodge where he was the squire. His second wife was Henrietta Portman. When Henrietta's second child, Grosvenor Tregonwell, died, having been accidentally given a double dose of medicine, Henrietta sank into a melancholia, which resulted in the Tregonwells holidaying at Mudeford, near Christchurch, Hampshire, to recuperate. During their holiday they visited 'Bourne', which they found so delightful that they bought land there in 1810. They subsequently built a house on the site, precipitating the growth of what became Bournemouth.

More than 200 years earlier, Tregonwell's direct ancestor, Henry Hastings, the eccentric Dorset sportsman (son of George Hastings, 4th Earl of Huntingdon), had briefly controlled the land that his great-great-great grandson bought, when he was lord of the manor of Christchurch from 1597 until 1601. Hastings' youngest daughter Dorothy married Thomas Tregonwell.

== Military career ==
By 1796, Tregonwell was Captain of the Dorset Rangers and led cliff-top patrols of the Dorset Yeomanry in the area of Bourne Heath between 1796 and 1802 during the Napoleonic Wars. The eastern part of Dorset was under the command of Henry Bankes of Kingston Lacy; Bankes divided his area into several smaller parcels, and allocated officers to each area. Tregonwell was matched with the easternmost region, which took him up to the Liberty of Westover (now the site of Bournemouth). The rangers' duty was to keep watch for smugglers, particularly along the cliff-tops, where Chines (wide fissures in the soft cliffs) allowed potentially easy access for smugglers and French invaders.

Tregonwell was also a Justice of the Peace and Deputy Lieutenant for the county of Dorset. After the Battle of Trafalgar, the threat of invasion by the French lessened and so in 1810, he felt that he was able to retire from the service.

== Later life ==
=== Summer mansion ===
In 1810, the Tregonwells decided to build a house near Bourne Heath to live in over the summer months, their main residence remaining Cranborne Lodge. Tregonwell was able to buy 8.5 acres (34,000 m^{2}) of what is now Bournemouth town centre for just £179 11s (£179.55) from Sir George Ivison Tapps, the Lord of the manor of Christchurch.

On 4 July 1810, Tregonwell and his wife took their friends, the Grove family, on a visit to Bourne Mouth.

We all walked on the sands. The Tregonwells are here and very kind to us. We went after dinner to see a place Mr T has bought and talks of building on called Bourn. It is very barren but [has] a pretty sea view.

— Harriet Grove, Diary of Harriet Grove

They slept in the new house for the first time on 24 April 1812.

The house survives to this day as a wing of the Royal Exeter Hotel.

=== Portman Lodge ===
Tregonwell built a cottage for his butler, Symes. Originally called Symes' Cottage, it was later renamed Portman Lodge, after Henrietta's maiden name. This building was badly damaged in a fire in 1922 and demolished in 1930.

== Legacy ==
In 1832, Tregonwell died at the age of 73 and was buried in Anderson, but in 1843 his widow had his remains transferred to a vault in St Peter's Churchyard at Bournemouth. For many years Tregonwell was revered as 'The Founder' (of Bournemouth) the Mayor of Bournemouth would attend an annual Founder's Service at Saint Peter's, during which he would lay a wreath on Tregonwell's tomb.

When Portman Lodge was demolished in 1930, suspicions were raised that Tregonwell or Symes were involved in some way with smuggling. A secret chamber was found 3 ft (0.91 m) below the ground surface, with an arched roof 6 ft (1.8 m) above the floor. It was 10 ft (3.0 m) in length and 7 ft (2.1 m) in width, and was accessible through a trapdoor. The Symes clan of Cranborne, Verwood and Sixpenny Handley had long been involved in smuggling, and the butler never appeared to travel with Tregonwell, so it is possible that he looked after his master's smuggling activities while he was away.

There is documentary evidence, mostly in private diaries, for instance those of the Earl of Malmesbury, that the gentry colluded in smuggling activities; Tregonwell's smuggling connections, however, remain entirely speculative. Underground rooms were often used as ice-houses, as the only available form of refrigeration; links such structures with smuggling is generally no more than speculative. When Bournemouth was mostly heathland, the land featured small gravelly hollows surrounded by gorse bushes, which were most likely to be used as hiding places, as contraband made a swift journey inland.
