= Sheriff Hill Colliery =

Coordinates: 54°55′50″N 1°34′25″W

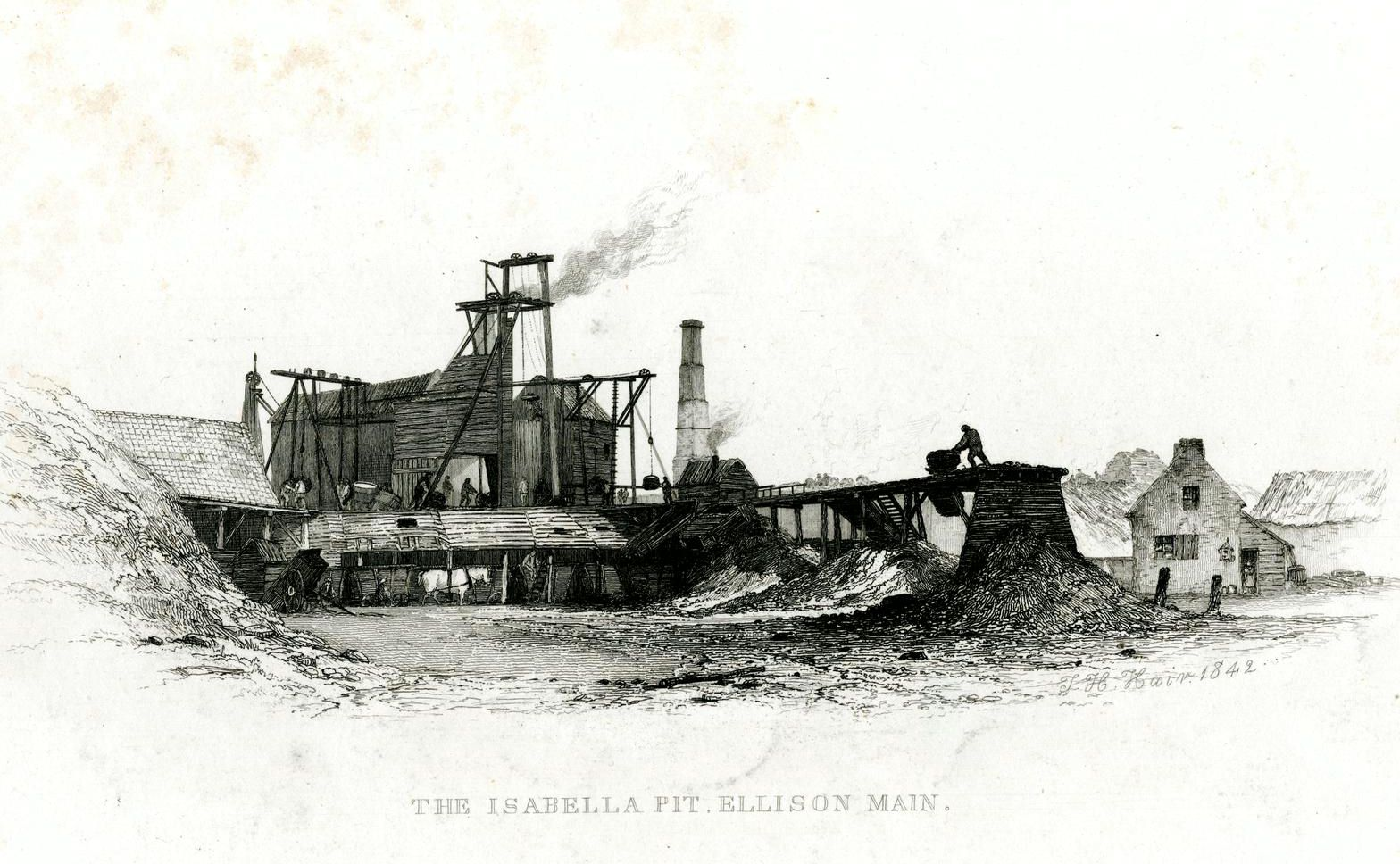
Isabella Pit, Sheriff Hill Colliery, 1842

Sheriff Hill Colliery or Ellison Main Colliery was a coal mine at Gateshead Fell in County Durham, England. The colliery had two shafts and provided employment to the residents of Sheriff Hill, after it opened in 1793. There were many major accidents resulting in the deaths of workers at the colliery. There was a protracted strike at the colliery in 1834. The colliery closed in 1926.

== Opening and ownership ==
Sheriff Hill Colliery was situated at the summit of Gateshead Fell at the boundary between Sheriff Hill and Low Fell approximately 2 3/4 miles from Newcastle upon Tyne. The exact date of opening is not known, different sources give dates between 1780 and 1800, though one source provides a date of 1750.

Ownership of the colliery changed hands a number of times: in 1840 the lease was granted to Messers Hutchinson and Lamb under Cuthbert Ellison and when it closed it was owned by the Heworth Coal Company Ltd.

== Operation ==
As a result of the Hartley Colliery Disaster in 1862, legislation was passed requiring collieries have at least two exits. Sheriff Hill Colliery had two shafts, the Fanny and Isabella Pits.

Fanny Pit was situated off the turnpike road at the crest of Sheriff Hill alongside wooded area, the Fanny Pit Plantation. The shaft was 535 feet (163 m) above sea level and in 1894 plumbed a depth of 804 feet (245 m). The Isabella Pit was shallower with a depth of 738 feet (225 m).

Contemporary evidence provides that the operation of the colliery ran thus:

The coals are drawn at two shafts by an engine of about 30 horses' power, which raises three corves at once. Another engine, of the same power, is employed in pumping the water to a height of 30 fathoms from the bottom, where it is discharged into a drift of about 1¼ mile in length, and is finally drawn out by an engine at the Low Fell. The waggon-way from the Isabella Pit to the Tyne is about 3 miles in length, and the waggons are transmitted along it chiefly by means of inclined planes.

== Major incidents ==
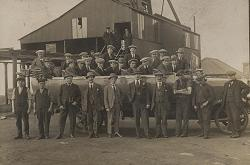
The proud workforce pose for a photograph at Fanny Pit, Sheriff Hill in 1921. Photograph taken from Gateshead Council public archive.

A number of incidents at the colliery resulted in fatalities. There was an explosion on 27 December 1793 resulting in 14 deaths. Another explosion on 27 June 1815 caused 11 fatalities. Less than six months later, on 11 December 1815, a fire claimed five lives.

On 19 July 1819, an explosion tore through the colliery killing 35 men. It was reported that:

“On Tuesday morning last, owing, it is reported, to some neglect or mismanagement regarding the safety-lamps in the Sheriff-hill pit, at Gateshead, near Newcastle-on-Tyne, a dreadful explosion took place, by which nearly 40 persons have lost their lives. Had the accident happened an hour later, it is said about 100 persons would have perished. Eighteen of the unhappy sufferers have been interred in Gateshead church-yard, and 14 in the chapel-yard; the remaining bodies have either given to their respective friends, or are not yet taken out of the pit. Amongst the poor unfortunates, were three boys from Whitehaven, who had been taken there by their mother, and obtained work, but were soon after dismissed; their parent subsequently appealed to those in management, and again obtained employment for her children, just in time to share the melancholy fate that has befallen their fellow-sufferers. The same pit, we believe, exploded about four years ago, when considerable damage was done”

In 1821, pitman John Wilson was rather more fortunate:

“Early on the morning of Tuesday week, some men belonging to Sheriff-hill Colliery, Northumberland, were waiting the arrival of the gin-horse to go down into the pit. Owing to the cleaning of the boiler, the regular engine rope was not in a working state at the moment; but about 20 fathoms of it, with the chain, were hanging into the shaft. One of the men, John Wilson, having, in the dark, gone incautiously too near the bridge, fell in. Repeated cries from within the shaft at last roused the attention of the other men, who, on repairing to the spot with a light, were told by him that he had fallen into the pit, and was then hanging by the rope.

As soon as the alarm would allow them to take measures for his preservation, they proceeded to adjust the gin-rope — a work that occupied not less than 15 minutes, from their having to discharge it on one pulley and place it upon another. After fixing on a corf, one of them wished to descend in it to his assistance, but this Wilson forbade them to do so. The corf was now let down gently till it came under his feet; he then freed himself from the engine rope, and being seated in the corf, was drawn slowly to bank, in a state of indescribable trepidation. He was, however, able, with the assistance of another man, to walk upwards of a mile to his own house, which on entering, he threw himself upon his knees, and poured out his fervent thanks to God for his deliverance. No sooner was this done than, overpowered by the dreadful conflict of his feelings, he fainted.

Some time elapsed before he recovered tolerable composure, and even still when the subject is recurred to, his agitation is extreme. Being questioned minutely, he said he had gone to the brink of the shaft to ascertain whether his comrade was calling upon him from below, and being deceived by a glimmering of light through a crevice in the brattice partition, his feet slipped. He was conscious at the moment he dropt in, but has no recollection whatever of how or when he caught hold of the engine rope. The first thing he was sensible of was the rope sliding in his breast, and next its stripping his left hand, which he held mainly on, and also with the legs and feet. He had in his right hand a small stick, of which he kept firm possession all the time, and brought it up with him. There was a chasm of 450 feet perpendicular depth yawning beneath”.

Failure to adhere to safety standards saw workers given severe punishments. In June 1824, pitmen Timothy Forster and John Miller were ‘committed to hard labour in the House of Correction in Durham’ after removing the top of their Davy safety lamps whilst working in the pit. It was reported that "similar acts of carelessness are so frequently committed, to the imminent risk of the lives of the colliers, that we understand the coal-owners are determined to punish every such act in future with the utmost rigour.”

== Strikes of 1832 and 1833 ==
In light of the recurring fatalities, poor working conditions and low pay, miners at Sheriff Hill Colliery undertook one of the earliest large-scale industrial actions in England Such was the scale of the disorder that the traditional Sheriff's March on Gateshead Fell had to be re-routed to avoid it. Pitmen marched through Sheriff Hill and Low Fell carrying a banner depicting the colliery owners as rats, taking the bread from the mouths of the workers.

A year later, the miners were "forcibly ejected from the colliery". The response of the pitmen was sufficiently violent for soldiers from the Newcastle barracks to be called to deal with the dispute. The colliery owners brought in replacement workers from Wales, but when they were met on friendly terms by the ejected miners and their families (camped on Church Road, Sheriff Hill) before arriving at the colliery, many chose to join the camp rather than replace local pitmen. The dispute ended when the colliery owners made concessions and most of the pitmen returned to work, although the strike organisers were deemed 'no longer employable'.

== Closure ==
The date of closure is unknown, one source suggests it closed before 1895 although a Gateshead Council photograph claims to show pitmen from the colliery in 1924.

== Bibliography ==
- Hair, T.H (1844). A Series of views of the Collieries in the Counties of Northumberland and Durham. London. ISBN 0-946865-07-8.
- Manders, Francis William David (1973). A History of Gateshead. Gateshead Corporation. ISBN 0-901273-02-3.
- McKenzie, Eneas (1827). Historical Account of Newcastle-upon-Tyne: Including the Borough of Gateshead. McKenzie and Dent. ISBN 978-1-144-29746-4.
- Reed, Andrew (1894). An Account of the Strata of Northumberland & Durham- Borings & Sinkings. North of England Institute of Mining and Mechanical Engineers.
