= Newcastle Journal =

The Newcastle Journal can refer to two newspapers published in Newcastle upon Tyne:

- Newcastle Journal (1739–1788), an 18th-century weekly
- The Journal (Newcastle upon Tyne newspaper), a weekly founded in 1832 as the Newcastle Journal
