= Sheriff Hill =

Coordinates: 54.939°N 1.586°W

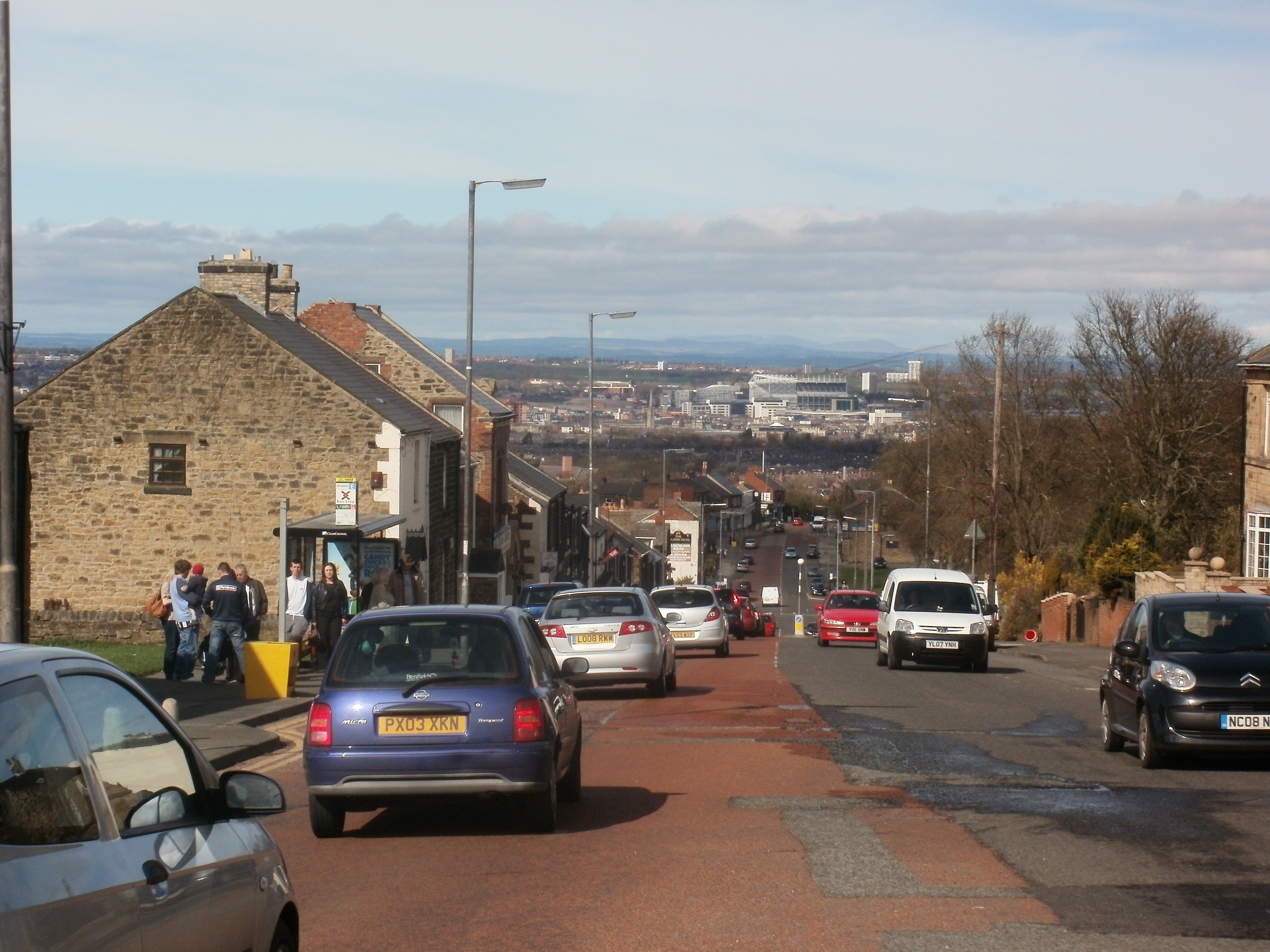
- Sheriffs Highway, Sheriff Hill

- Location within Tyne and Wear
- Population: 5,051
- OS grid reference: NZ265605
- Metropolitan borough: Gateshead
- Metropolitan county: Tyne and Wear
- Region: North East
- Country: England
- Sovereign state: United Kingdom
- Post town: GATESHEAD
- Postcode district: NE9
- Dialling code: 0191
- Police: Northumbria
- Fire: Tyne and Wear
- Ambulance: North East
- UK Parliament: Gateshead Central and Whickham

Sheriff Hill is a suburb in the Metropolitan Borough of Gateshead in Tyne and Wear, England. It lies on the B1296 road 2 miles (3 km) south of Gateshead, 2.5 miles (4 km) south of Newcastle upon Tyne and 12 miles (19 km) north of the historic city of Durham. According to the 2001 UK census it had a population of 5,051.

Historically part of Gateshead Fell in County Durham, Sheriff Hill was the site of a battle between William the Conqueror and Malcolm III of Scotland in 1068. A road was built through Gateshead Fell in the early 13th century, attracting some settlers. A procession of bishops, sheriffs and noblemen known as the Sheriff's March took place on the road in 1282, and continued biannually until the 1830s. By then, Gateshead Fell had been enclosed and a village had grown around the road, largely populated by an influx of tinkers, coalminers working at Sheriff Hill Colliery and workers at the local pottery, mill and sandstone quarry. By the turn of the 20th century these industries were in steep decline. The local authority built a large council estate at Sheriff Hill to alleviate dangerous overcrowding in Gateshead, effectively turning the area into a residential suburb. It ceased to be an independent village on 1 April 1974 when it was incorporated into the Metropolitan Borough of Gateshead under the terms of the Local Government Act 1972.

Now part of the local council ward of High Fell, the suburb is economically disadvantaged compared with other areas of the borough and nationally, with high levels of unemployment. Sheriff Hill was the site of one of Gateshead's largest boarding schools but as of 2012, the only remaining educational establishment is Glynwood Primary School. The suburb also contains the Queen Elizabeth Hospital – the largest hospital in Gateshead, a small dene and a small park. The principal landmark is St John the Evangelist Church, one of three Grade II listed buildings in the area and one of two remaining churches. The southern end of Sheriff's Highway – the main road through the suburb, is more than 500 feet (150 m) above sea level, making it the highest point in Gateshead.

== History ==
=== Early history ===
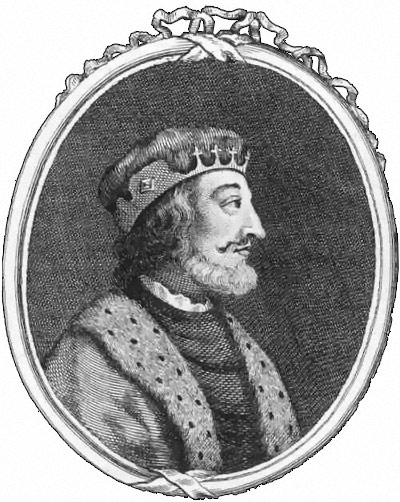
Malcolm III of Scotland was repelled by William the Conqueror at Sheriff Hill in 1068

Until the 19th century, Sheriff Hill was part of Gateshead Fell, a "windswept, barren and treacherous heath" that took its name from the town of Gateshead and the fell or common land contiguous with it. In 1068, Malcolm III of Scotland marched across the Scottish border to challenge the authority of William the Conqueror. Malcolm, accompanied by native insurgents and foreign supporters, was met by William's men in the area of Sheriff Hill and was decisively beaten. In the 13th century, a road through Gateshead Fell became the main trade route between Durham and Newcastle and as its importance grew, two public houses – the Old Cannon and The Three Tuns, were built along with a small number of houses.

The settlement's name derives from the Sheriff's March; an ancient, biannual procession first held in 1278. An inquisition at Tynemouth declared that the King of Scotland, the Archbishop of York, the Prior of Tynemouth, the Bishop of Durham and Gilbert de Umfraville, Earl of Angus should meet the justices before they entered Newcastle from the south. A procession was held before the meeting; on the appointed day the procession started in Newcastle, crossed the River Tyne to Gateshead and made its way up the steep road. The meeting place was initially at Chile Well but subsequently the procession came to "light and go into the house". The house was the Old Cannon public house, where drink was served at the sheriff's expense. When the judges arrived, the procession returned to Newcastle.

In 1647, Gateshead Fell was surveyed and was found to consist of 1,300 acres (530 ha) of land. A number of small, isolated settlements had developed around the road at modern-day Deckham, Wrekenton, Low Fell and Sheriff Hill. The few cottages and properties at Sheriff Hill were of such poor quality that in 1713, the total of ninety-one cottages returned only £8 9s 6d in rent. (Note: According to the currency converter available on the National Archive website, this amounts to £649.10 today.) The rental rate declined over the years and eventually, poverty rates were so high that several tenants paid no rent. The houses were extremely unappealing; many were essentially mud huts – earth mounds carved into dwellings and roofed with sod. The length of the road that ran through Sheriff Hill was called Sodhouse Bank. By the middle of the 18th century, the area had become a wild and frightening place (Note: One account recalled: "Gateshead Fell, as the name implies, was once a wild common, over a portion of which lay the road between Durham and Newcastle. The loneliness of the bleak moorland was quite guile enough to invest it with terror to travellers and occasionally there were incidents that served greatly to enhance the evil repute of the locality.") and when theologian John Wesley arrived in 1785, he found a "pathless waste of white".

=== Industrial growth and enclosure ===
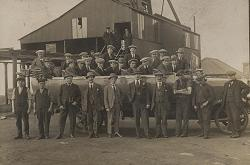
The workforce at Fanny Pit, Sheriff Hill in 1921

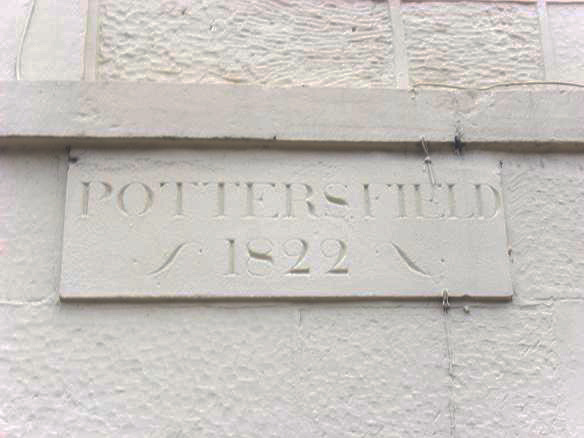
A surviving reference to Sheriff Hill's pottery heritage at 124 Sheriff's Highway

The road through Gateshead Fell was turnpiked by the Durham to Tyne Bridge Road Act in 1747. Although it had brought some early settlers to the area, the development of industry allowed the formative settlement to grow. In 1740, John Warburton opened a pottery at Carr Hill which is credited with introducing white earthenware to Tyneside. Encouraged by Warburton's success, Paul Jackson established the Sheriff Hill Pottery in 1771 at the northern end of the turnpike road and by 1775 was advertising his earthenware in the Newcastle Journal. (Note: "P. Jackson, Pilgrim Street, Newcastle, having brought his different kind of Earthen Ware to great perfection, hopes for Encouragement from his Friends. He sells wholesale and retail at his manufactory on Gateshead Commons, adjoining the turnpike road and near the Two-mile stone, and at his shop on the Quay, cream coloured enamelled, fine black, gilded, spotted and brown Earthen Ware; also large Ware, as Milk, Cream, Butter and Beef Pots and Washing Mugs. Hawkers from Northumberland and Cumberland may be supplied at his shop.") Jackson's pottery, which became a local centre of pottery production, attracted settlers to the area and became a source of pride to local residents. (Note: One resident recalled: "We watched men digging clay from a cavity in a hillock and the potters at their wheels ... I remember the satisfactory feeling which swept through the lower end of the village near the pottery when the kiln was drawn, and the ware in it was pronounced good ... ")

In 1793, Sheriff Hill Colliery, or "Ellison Main Colliery", opened at the summit of Gateshead Fell on the boundary between Sheriff Hill and Low Fell. The colliery had two shafts – the Fanny and Isabella Pits – and provided employment for over 100 men and boys. In 1809, an Act ordered the enclosure of Gateshead Fell. (Note: This had been mooted for almost 300 years and had caused (occasionally violent) disputes between the Durham gentry and locals.) Commissioners were appointed to settle claims and apportion Gateshead Fell accordingly. Plans were laid for the requisition and construction of wells, quarries, drains, roads and watering places – including a well at Blue Quarries. New roads, today known as Blue Quarries Road, Church Road and Windy Nook Road, were built. The last allotment land disputes were settled in 1830 and Gateshead Fell was entirely enclosed, formally creating the villages of Sheriff Hill, Low Fell, Deckham, Carr Hill and Wrekenton. After the enclosure, Sheriff Hill was a rural settlement before becoming a village.

In 1819, an explosion tore through the Sheriff Hill Colliery killing thirty-five people. Other industries were flourishing in the area; in 1823 "Heworth Windmill" or "Snowden's Mill", a gristmill worked by around thirty employees, was built and "Blue Quarries", a sandstone quarry, was opened in 1820 and provided employment for stonemasons, quarrymen and their apprentices. While not as extensive as Kell's Quarries at Windy Nook, Blue Quarries produced "Newcastle Grindstones" of excellent quality and world renown.

=== Modern history ===
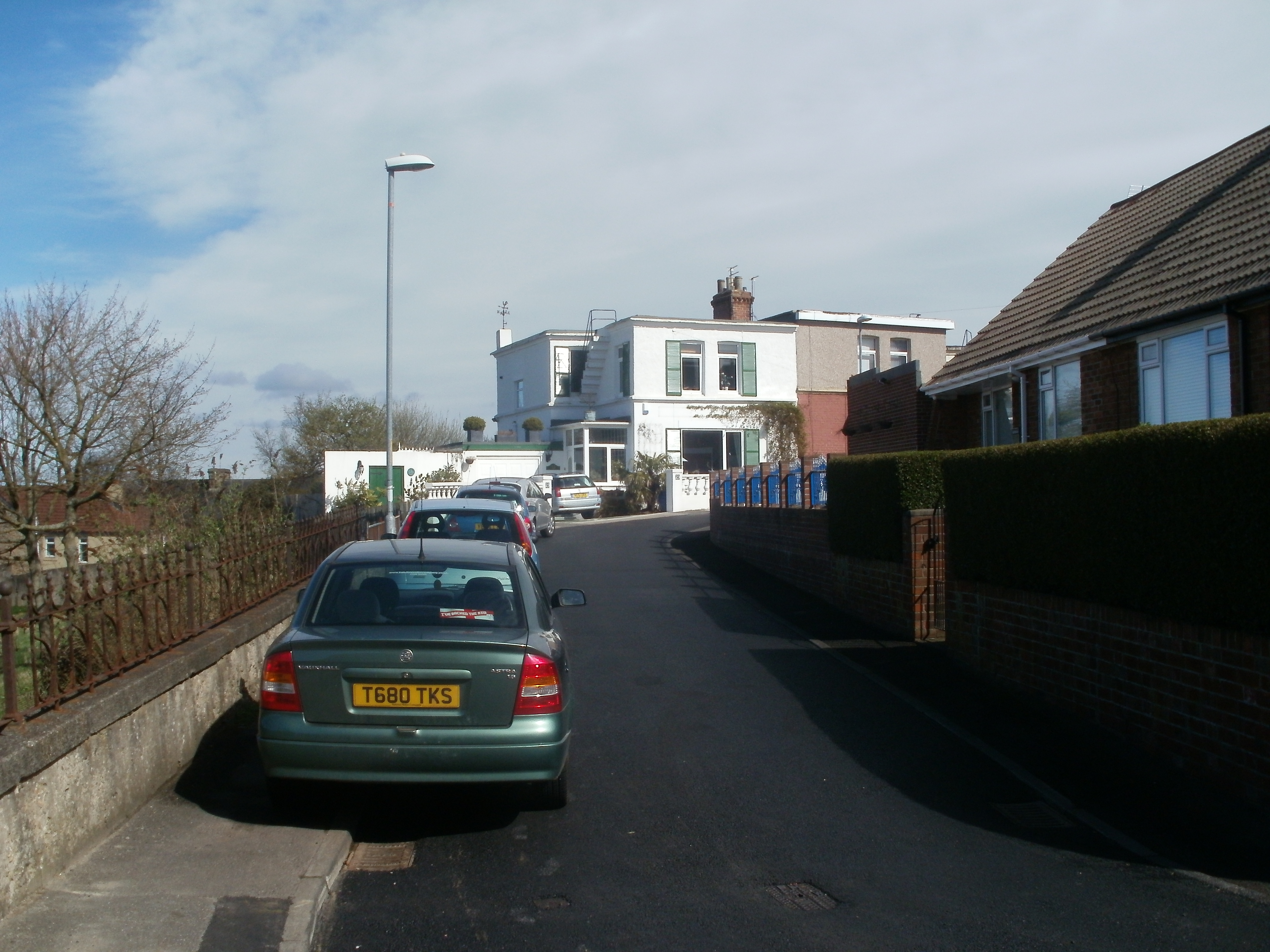
Housing in the Egremont Estate

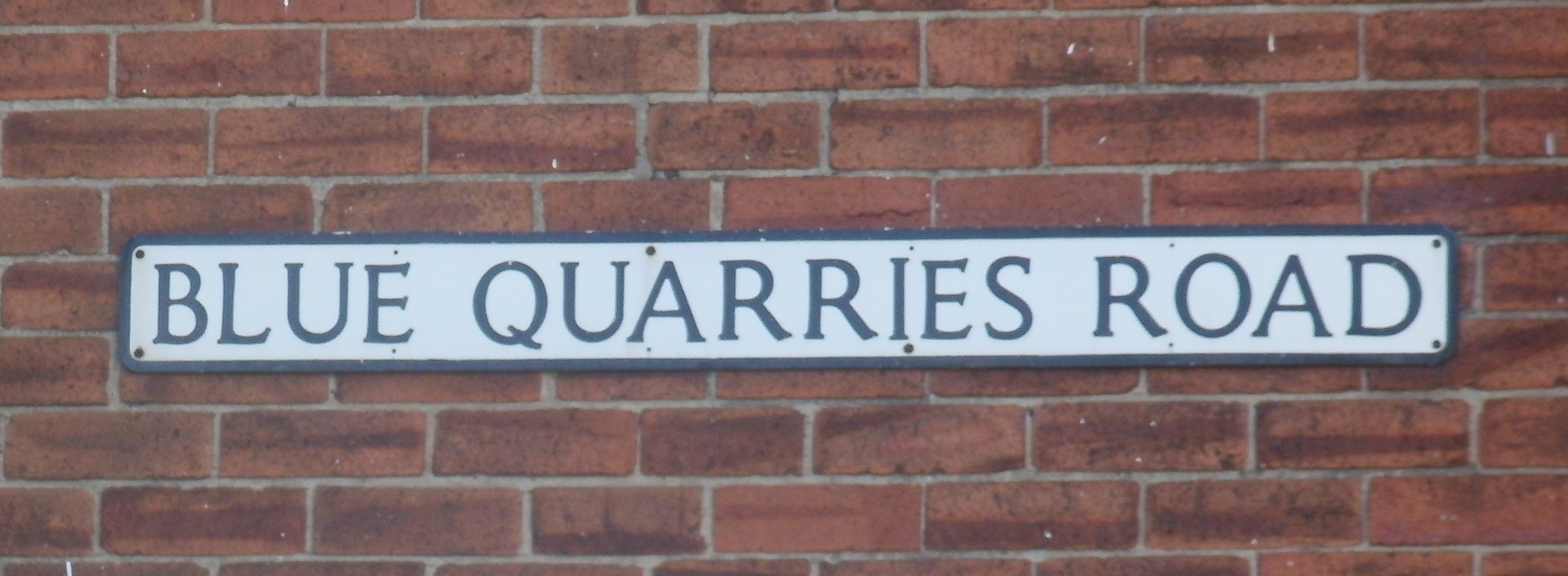
A surviving reference to Sheriff Hill's industrial heritage.

By the turn of the 20th century, the industries at Sheriff Hill were in decline. In the 1890s the Old Mill closed, as did Sheriff Hill Pottery in 1909. In the 1920s, Blue Quarries was filled in and Sheriff Hill Colliery, the longest surviving industrial operation, closed in 1926. The only surviving reminders of the suburb's industrial past are street names such as "Pottersway" and "Blue Quarries Road".

The industries that had disappeared were replaced by tracts of housing. While most of the sod cottages were torn down after enclosure, the remaining dwellings were in such poor condition that in 1883, Gateshead's Medical Health Officer described their standard as one of abject squalor. Some private housing estates were built in Sheriff Hill around 1900, including the Egremont Estate – a distinctive estate dating from around 1910 where the houses have flat roofs with steps leading to them as an architectural feature, and also at Sourmilk Hill, where there are some irregularly arranged vernacular houses built from locally quarried stone and slate which give the area "the character of a small, rural farmstead". These developments did little to alleviate the unsanitary conditions and the chronic overcrowding in the village and across the borough. In light of these problems Gateshead Council, after having previously refused in 1911 and 1917, decided to purchase 65 acres (26 ha) of land in Carr Hill and Sheriff Hill under the Housing Act 1919 at a cost of £19,000 in February 1919.

This led to the building of the first council housing estate in Gateshead. Alderman Hodkin laid the foundation stone on 27 October 1920; as work commenced the Alderman demonstrated the authority's concerns, telling the local newspaper that: "we can build houses, but we cannot build homes. Only the people themselves can do that and I hope that the spirit of 'esprit de corps' will prevail and this will be a model estate" Demand was high – there were 427 applicants for the first twenty eight houses built – and the council built further tracts of housing in a broad triangle between Sodhouse Bank, Ermine Crescent and The Avenue, although central government withdrew its promised funding. By 1936, most of the social housing available as of 2012 was in existence and provides accommodation to over half of the population of the suburb.

Sheriff Hill is now a residential suburb of Gateshead; in 1974 it was incorporated into the Metropolitan Borough of Gateshead by the implementation of the Local Government Act 1972, before which it was considered part of County Durham. It is bordered by Low Fell to the west, Deckham to the north, Beacon Lough to the south and Windy Nook and Carr Hill to the east.

== Governance ==
Gateshead Council, High Fell – 2012 local elections
Candidate name	Political party	Number of votes	% of votes cast
Jean Lee	Labour	1,393	75.1%
Elaine Brunskill	Trade Unionist and Socialist Coalition	248	13.4%
Edward Borhill	Conservative	109	5.9%
Norman Spours	Liberal Democrats	106	5.7%

Sheriff Hill comprises part of the High Fell council ward of the Metropolitan Borough of Gateshead. The ward covers approximately 2 square kilometres (0.77 sq mi), has a population of 8,952, and is represented on Gateshead Council by three councillors.

Sheriff Hill is represented in Parliament as part of the Gateshead constituency; the sitting Member of Parliament (MP) is Labour representative Ian Mearns, who was elected at the May 2010 general election with a majority of 12,549 votes over Liberal Democrat Frank Hindle. The swing from Labour to the Liberal Democrats was 3.9%.

Before May 2010, the area was part of the Gateshead East and Washington West constituency, which was abolished in that year's boundary changes. The MP for Gateshead East and Washington West from 2005 to 2010 was Sharon Hodgson, who campaigned in the newly formed constituency of Washington and Sunderland West. Hodgson succeeded Joyce Quin, who retired on 11 April 2005.

== Geography and topography ==
Sheriff Hill is 2 miles (3.2 km) south of Gateshead town centre and 255 miles (410 km) from London. The underlying geology is predominantly sandstone, grindstone and clay. At the southern end of the suburb the land reaches an elevation of over 500 feet (150 m) above sea level, which is the highest point in the borough. In 1829, the view of Newcastle and the River Tyne from the hill was said to be "uncommonly grand" and it inspired local artist Thomas Miles Richardson (Note: Described as the leading artist in the area during the early 19th century.) to paint his first notable picture, "View of Newcastle from Gateshead Fell" in 1816. In spite of the extensive rebuilding in the 20th century, the natural topography still affords panoramic views, particularly to the east towards the coast and north as far as the Cheviot Hills, from several vantage points.

Sheriff Hill

Climate chart (precipitation, max. and min. temperature)
J	F	M	A	M	J	J	A	S	O	N	D
43 7 3	41 8 3	39 10 4	67 12 5	48 14 8	60 17 11	48 19 13	61 20 13	52 17 10	62 13 8	66 10 5	57 7 3
- █ Average max. and min. temperatures in °C
- █ Precipitation totals in mm
- Source: World Weather Online
Imperial conversion
J	F	M	A	M	J	J	A	S	O	N	D
1.7 45 37	1.6 46 37	1.5 50 39	2.6 54 41	1.9 57 46	2.3 63 52	1.9 66 55	2.4 68 55	2 63 50	2.5 55 46	2.6 50 41	2.3 45 37
- █ Average max. and min. temperatures in °F
- █ Precipitation totals in inches

=== Climate ===
Sheriff Hill, in common with much of the north east of England, has a temperate climate. The mean highest temperature is 12.8 °C (55.0 °F), which is slightly lower than the England average of 13.1 °C (55.6 °F). The mean lowest temperature, 7.2 °C (45.0 °F), is somewhat higher than the England average of 5.6 °C (42.1 °F). The total annual rainfall is 643.1 millimetres (25.32 in), significantly lower than the national average for England of 838.7 millimetres (33.02 in).

== Demography ==
Sheriff Hill compared (2011)
	Sheriff Hill	Gateshead	England
Total population	5,051	191,151	49,138,831
White	97.5%	98.4%	90.9%
BME	2.5%	1.6%	4.6%
Aged 0–19	29.2%	24.2%	26.32%
Aged 65+	16.8%	17.3%	15.9%
Male	47%	48.3%	48.7%
Female	53%	51.7%	51.3%

According to the United Kingdom Census 2001, Sheriff Hill has a population of 5,051 – 53% of whom are female, slightly above the national average, and 47% are male. 2.5% of the population are from a Black or other Minority Ethnic Group (BME), compared to 9.1% of the national population. Of the BME group, 41% are from the Asian or Asian–British ethnic group.

18.9% of all households are single-parent households, the fifth highest proportion in Gateshead compared with the Gateshead average of 11.5% and the UK average of 9.5%. 32.1% of households have dependent children, compared with 29.5% nationally and 28.4% in Gateshead. The Index of Multiple Deprivation, which divides England into 32,482 areas and considers quality of life indicators to measure deprivation, splits Sheriff Hill into two areas, one of which was in the top five per cent of deprived areas in England in 2007.

Sheriff Hill compares unfavourably with the wider Gateshead area in respect of adults with educational qualifications. 50.7% of adults in the suburb have no educational qualifications, compared with 38.4% across Gateshead and with the England average of 28.9%. 25.2% of adults have five or more GCSEs or equivalent at grades A* to C compared with 46.6% across England, and 11.5% of adults in the suburb have two or more A-Levels or equivalent compared with the England average of 28.2% and 18.6% across Gateshead.

=== Religion ===
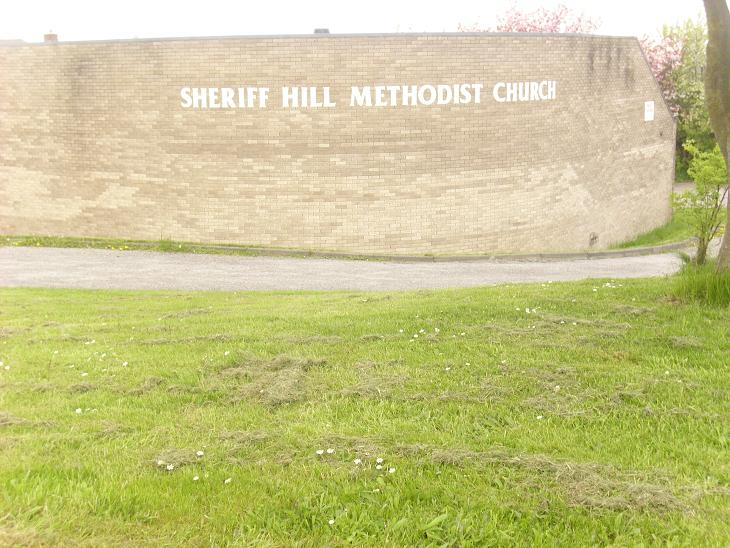
Sheriff Hill Methodist Church

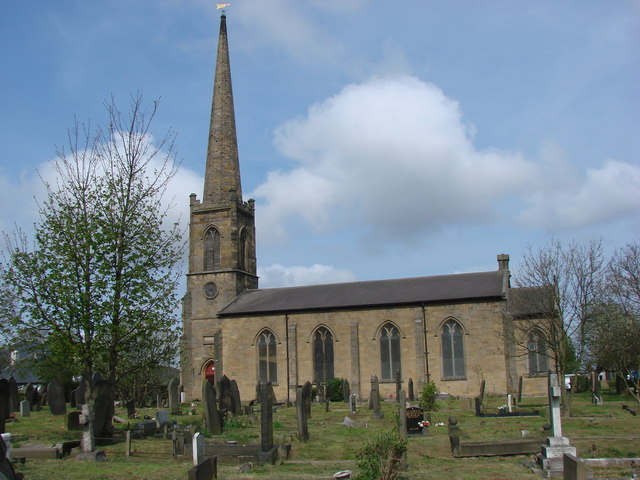
The Church of St John is the principal landmark in Sheriff Hill.

According to the 2001 UK census, 82.7% of residents in Sheriff Hill describe themselves as Christian. This is marginally higher than the regional average of 80.1% and substantially higher than the national average of 71.7%. The second most prevalent religion is Islam; some 0.57% of residents identify as Muslim. Around 0.1% identify as Buddhist and the same proportion identify as Jewish. Just 0.05% identify as Hindu. All of these figures are below the national average. Of the remaining residents, 0.1% adhere to a religion other than those stated, 11.2% have "no religion" and 5.1% did not state any religion. (Note: All data taken from Middle Layer Super Output Area – Gateshead 016, 2001 UK census.)

There are two churches in the suburb today. The Anglican Church of St John is located in Church Road and the Sheriff Hill Methodist Church, a member of United Methodist Free Churches, is located at the junction of Kells Lane and Sheriff's Highway and is shown on the 1939 ordnance survey maps. It is a modern, brick building of semi-circular design.

== Economy ==
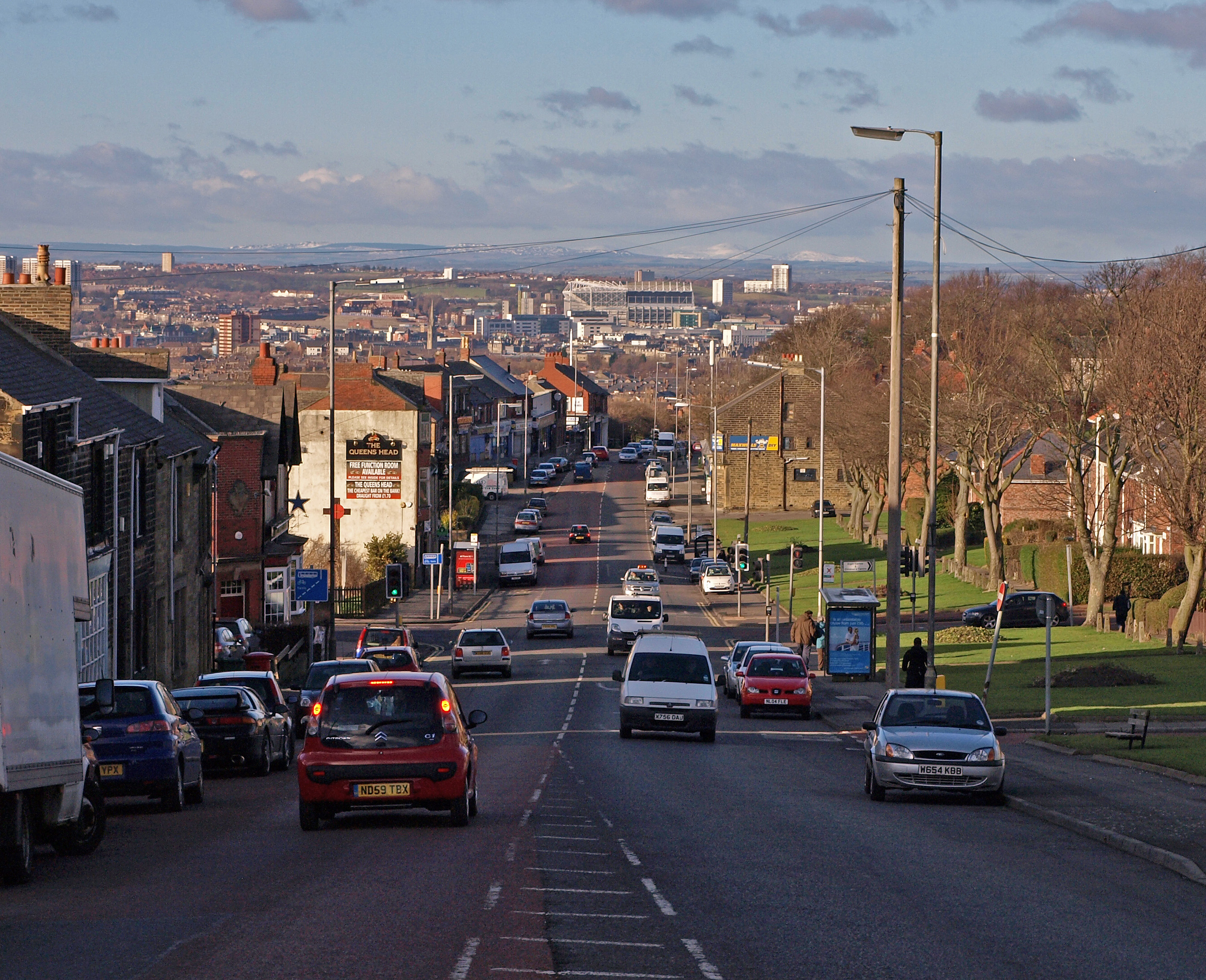
Shops at Sheriff's Highway provide employment to residents

While the original settlement at Sheriff Hill developed through the growth of industry in the area, the suburb today is predominantly residential with no significant industry. The suburb was once considered affluent, but as of 2012, almost half of the working age population are economically inactive and less than half of households own a car. The area has than higher levels of unemployment in comparison with Gateshead and England: at Broadway, Pottersway and the Avenue, only 23.8% of adults have full-time employment and 10.09% have part-time jobs. Around 3.1% of the population are self-employed. Those in employment work outside the area, except those employed in the suburb's public houses, betting shops or fast-food outlets. Other small shops provide some local employment, but few are open for any length of time as they cannot compete with larger retailers elsewhere in Gateshead.

== Health ==
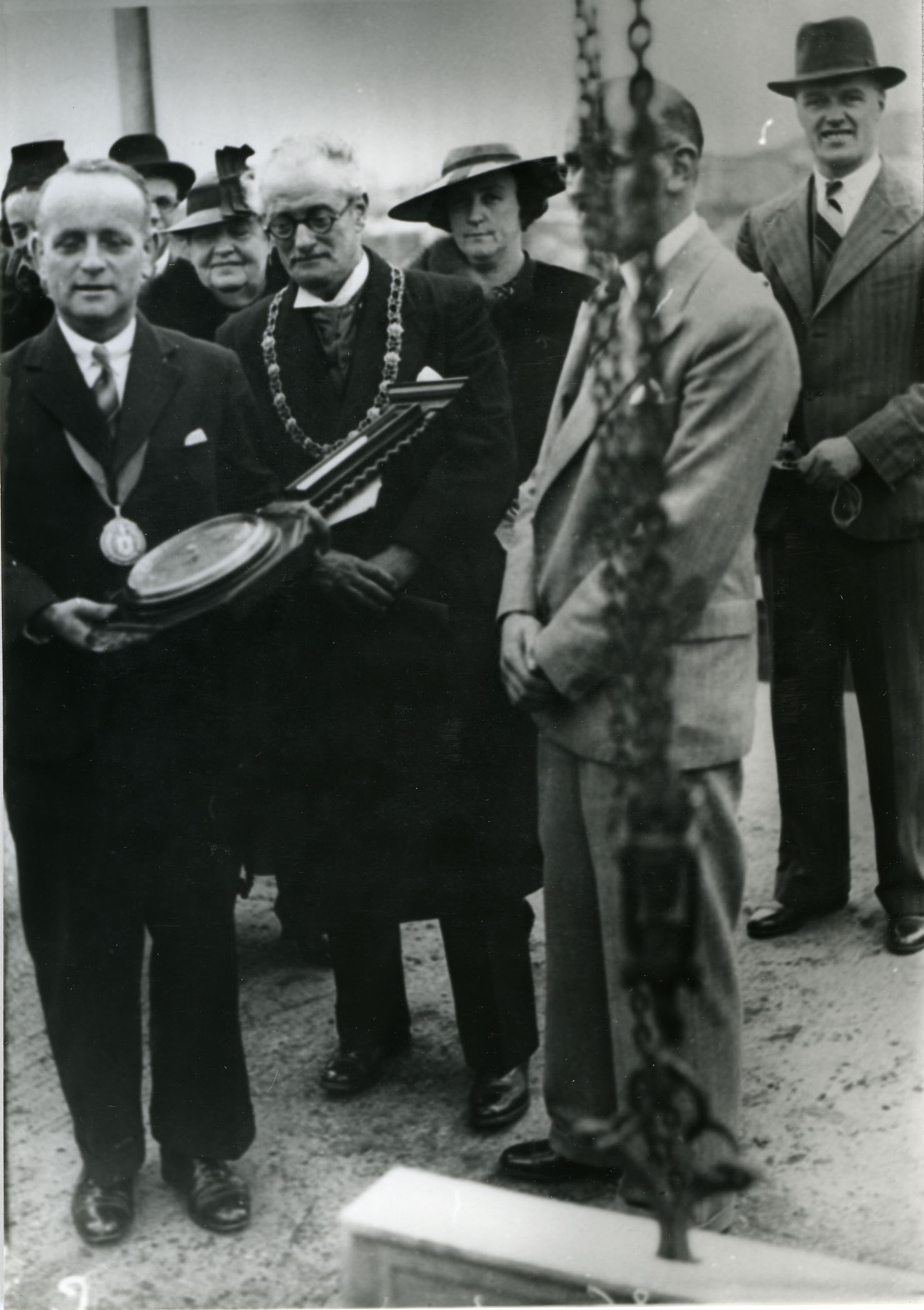
The mayor of Gateshead lays the foundation stone of the extension of the isolation hospital in 1938.

Sheriff Hill was once the site of a lunatic asylum, which was opened in the 1830s and situated on Sour Milk Hill Lane. Sheriff Hill Lunatic Asylum tended 86 patients in 1844 and continued to attract admissions until its closure in 1860. Soon after, work began on a 38–bed isolation hospital at what is today Queen Elizabeth Avenue. The first building was completed in 1878 and others were added later. The 4-acre (1.6 ha) site was enclosed by a large stone wall tipped with barbed wire and broken glass, and by 1903 the hospital comprised a main block with an administrative building in the centre with a ward block on each side, another three-ward block, a porter's lodge, a steam disinfecting building, a laundry and a mortuary. The hospital had a maximum capacity of 78 patients, who were tended by two resident doctors and 10 nurses.

During the period 1918 to 1939, the isolation hospital remained the sole medical provision in Sheriff Hill. Faced with an increase in population, Gateshead Council decided that a new general hospital should be built. In March 1938, preliminary work started on the Queen Elizabeth Hospital on the site of the isolation hospital; the foundations were laid in 1939 but the outbreak of World War II delayed the building work. The new hospital was opened by Queen Elizabeth, wife of King George VI, on 18 March 1948. It is the largest hospital in Gateshead and has since been expanded, most notably with the opening of the North East NHS Surgery Centre in 2008, which cost £13.3 million.

According to official data, Sheriff Hill residents experience comparatively poor health; 13.7% of the adult population are considered clinically obese, around 38% of adults smoke compared with the UK average of 25.9% of adults, and 37% of adults are binge drinkers. The average life expectancy for men is 77.9 years, the same as the UK average, but for women is 78 years; four years below the UK national average.

== Education ==
In 1875, Sheriff Hill Board School was opened on Church Road. The school was open to pupils aged 5 to 14, and the curriculum focused upon "the three Rs" and included some other subjects such as needlework and biblical instruction. Attendance was compulsory but truancy was rife – such was the scale of the problem that prizes and awards were presented to encourage attendance. (Note: These problems were largely eradicated when, in 1891, the 'penny-a-week' charge on parents was expunged in law and mandatory free education for children up to the age of 12 was established.) The school closed in 1947 and was replaced by Glynwood Primary School and Ennerdale Junior School, which were opened by Alderman Grant on 28 November 1953 after a dedication by the Rector of Gateshead.

Situated on Glynwood Gardens and Southend Road, the schools were later merged; Glynwood School survives as the sole educational establishment in Sheriff Hill. As of 2010, the school is larger than average and the proportion of children entitled to and claiming free school meals is well above the UK average. The pupils at Key Stage 1 and Key Stage 2 are taught subjects from the National Curriculum and achievement is broadly inline with the national average. After inspecting the school in 2010, OFSTED found it to be a "good" school and praised it for the high quality of teaching and for generating a positive and caring learning environment for pupils.

== Leisure and recreation ==
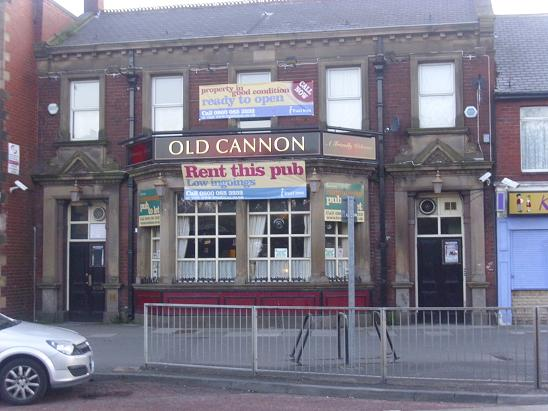
The Old Cannon inn, Sheriff Hill, in 2011

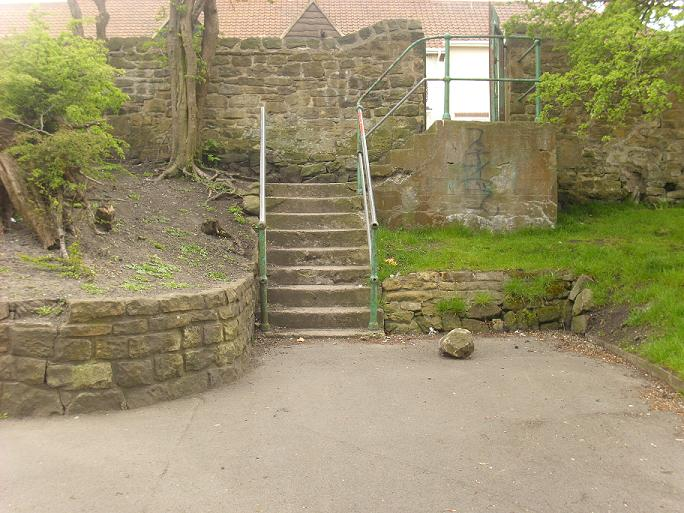
The south entrance to Hodkin Park.

Hodkin Park, at Sheriff's Highway, is one of many small parks in Gateshead. It is named in honour of Alderman Daniel Hodkin, Gateshead's deputy mayor in 1920 and a member of the Housing Committee which built council housing at Sheriff Hill. Hodkin Park was locally listed by Gateshead Council in 2004 in recognition of its significance to the local community. At the northern end of Sheriff's Highway there is a dene, shown as the "Quarry Plantation" on Ordnance Survey maps of 1858. In 2005, Gateshead Council carried out maintenance work on the dene, including the pruning of shrubbery and the installation of several sets of steps, to encourage residents to use the area.

Sheriff Hill contains several public houses because of its origin as a mining village with a population of tinkers, and because before Durham Road through Low Fell was opened in 1827, Sodhouse Bank (now Sheriff's Highway) was the route to the Great North Road. The Old Cannon, at the northern end of Sheriff's Highway, has existed since medieval times and its present name has been used since 1782, and possibly earlier. In 2016, the building still stands, but has been converted to a Chinese Takeaway. The Three Tuns, which is listed in trade directories in 1778, was the social hub of Sheriff Hill in the 19th century and used by miners and quarrymen, who engaged in cock fighting and cuddy races – informal races between pit donkeys where bets were placed – on open ground in Kells Lane. In 1867 it was the scene of a reception to celebrate the passing of Lord Russell's Reform Act, and reform meetings and benefit societies were subsequently held there. In recent times it has hosted a number of niche events, including an international pie festival in 2010 and an international sausage festival in 2011. Both the Old Cannon and The Three Tuns were locally listed by Gateshead Council in 2004. Other public houses in Sheriff Hill include the Queens Head, listed in trade directories since 1848, (which was converted into a 14 bedroom property in 2016) and the Travellers Rest, which was once called the "Golden Quiot".

Sheriff Hill Methodist Church plays an important social role in the community; it has hosted biannual jumble sales for many years and an annual Christmas Fayre is held at the church to mark the start of Christmas in Sheriff Hill.

== Landmarks ==
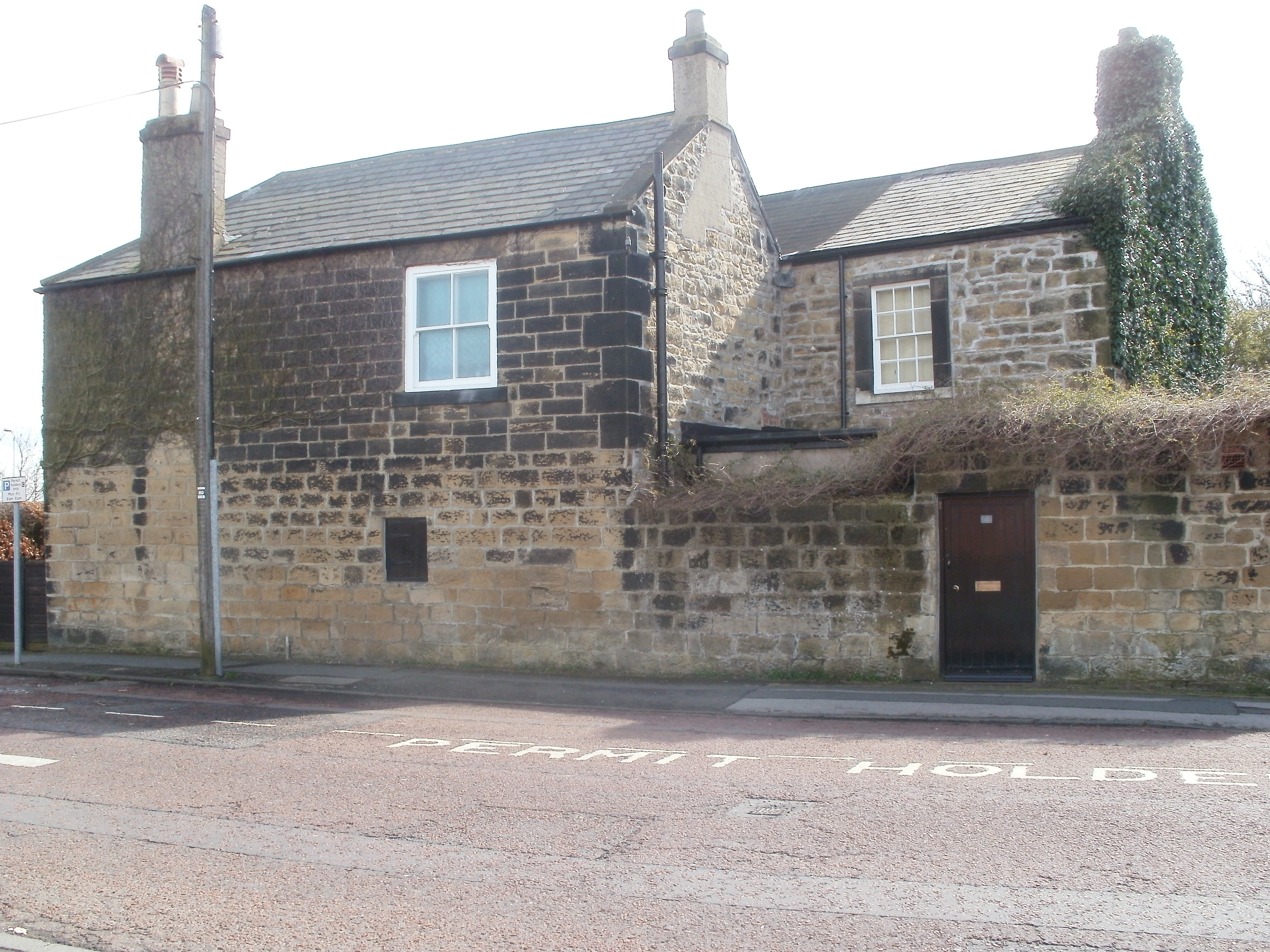
Field House from Windy Nook Road

Part of Sheriff Hill was designated a Conservation Area in 1999. The suburb has three Grade II listed buildings. The Church of St John was conceived in 1809 when an Enclosure Act decreed that a church be built on Gateshead Fell. The church was completed on 30 August 1825 at a cost of £2742. The church is a neat, plain, Gothic structure built from ashlar and slate, and was Grade II listed in 1950. The principal features are the tower and spire, which rise to 148 feet (45 m). Coupled with the natural terrain of the land, the top of the spire reaches over 500 feet (150 m) above sea level, making it the highest point in the metropolitan borough and one of the highest churches in England; it is visible for several miles in all directions, making it a prominent landmark and sea mark.

Field House on Windy Nook Road was built in the 19th century in rubble stone and Welsh slate. It has been described as a remnant of Sheriff Hill's rural past and was listed on 13 January 1983. Thornlea on Church Road is one of the oldest buildings in the suburb. It is built in stone ashlar with a low hipped slate roof and the doorpiece has two intact Greek Ionic columns. Much of the original grounds have survived intact, as have the original walls of locally quarried stone. It was listed on 13 January 1988. Additionally, Sheriff Hill has ten locally listed buildings. These are the Zion Methodist Chapel, six stone cottages at Sheriff's Highway, The Three Tuns and Old Cannon public houses, and houses at 13–14 Egremont Drive.

The elevation of Sheriff Hill affords dramatic views of the surrounding landscape across the Team Valley to the west and the Cheviot Hills to the north.

== Transport ==
Sheriff Hill is situated on the B1296 Old Durham Road, a wide and busy route that was formerly an alignment of the Great North Road, which was diverted through Low Fell. The section of Old Durham Road that traverses the suburb is called Sheriff's Highway. The journey time to Gateshead town centre by car or bus is approximately ten minutes, and approximately fifteen minutes to the centre of Newcastle upon Tyne. −

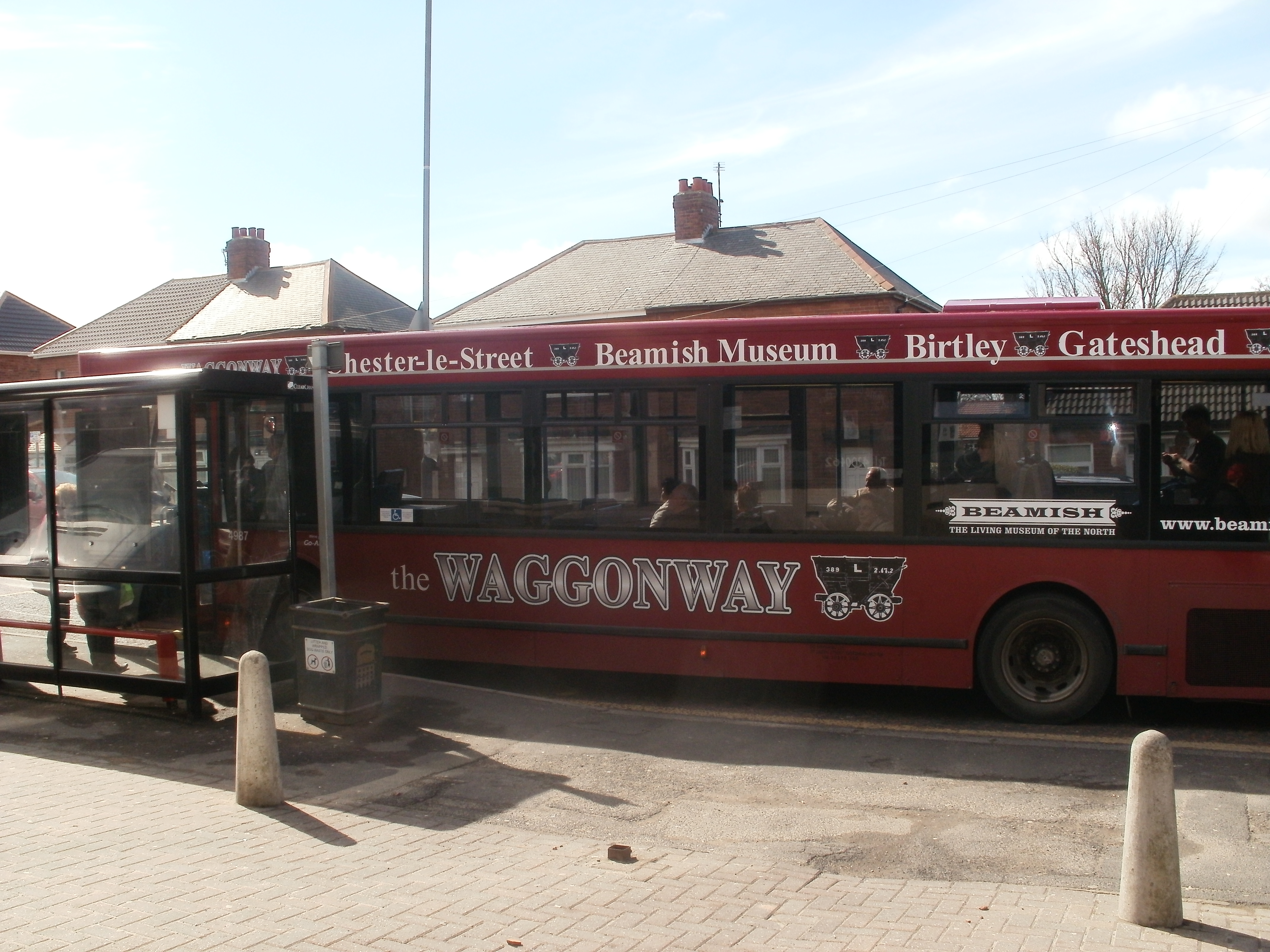
The No.28 stops at Sheriff's Highway.

The nearest mainline railway station is Newcastle, 3 miles (4.8 km) away. The nearest airport is Newcastle Airport, 7.9 miles (12.7 km) away.

Sheriff Hill is served by several bus services, including Waggonway 28, the Fab 56 which continues into Sunderland and the Fab 57, which terminates at the Ellen Wilkinson Estate and is part of the 93/94 Loop network. All buses serving Sheriff Hill are operated by Go North East under the administration of Tyne and Wear Passenger Transport Executive, known as "Nexus".

== Public services ==
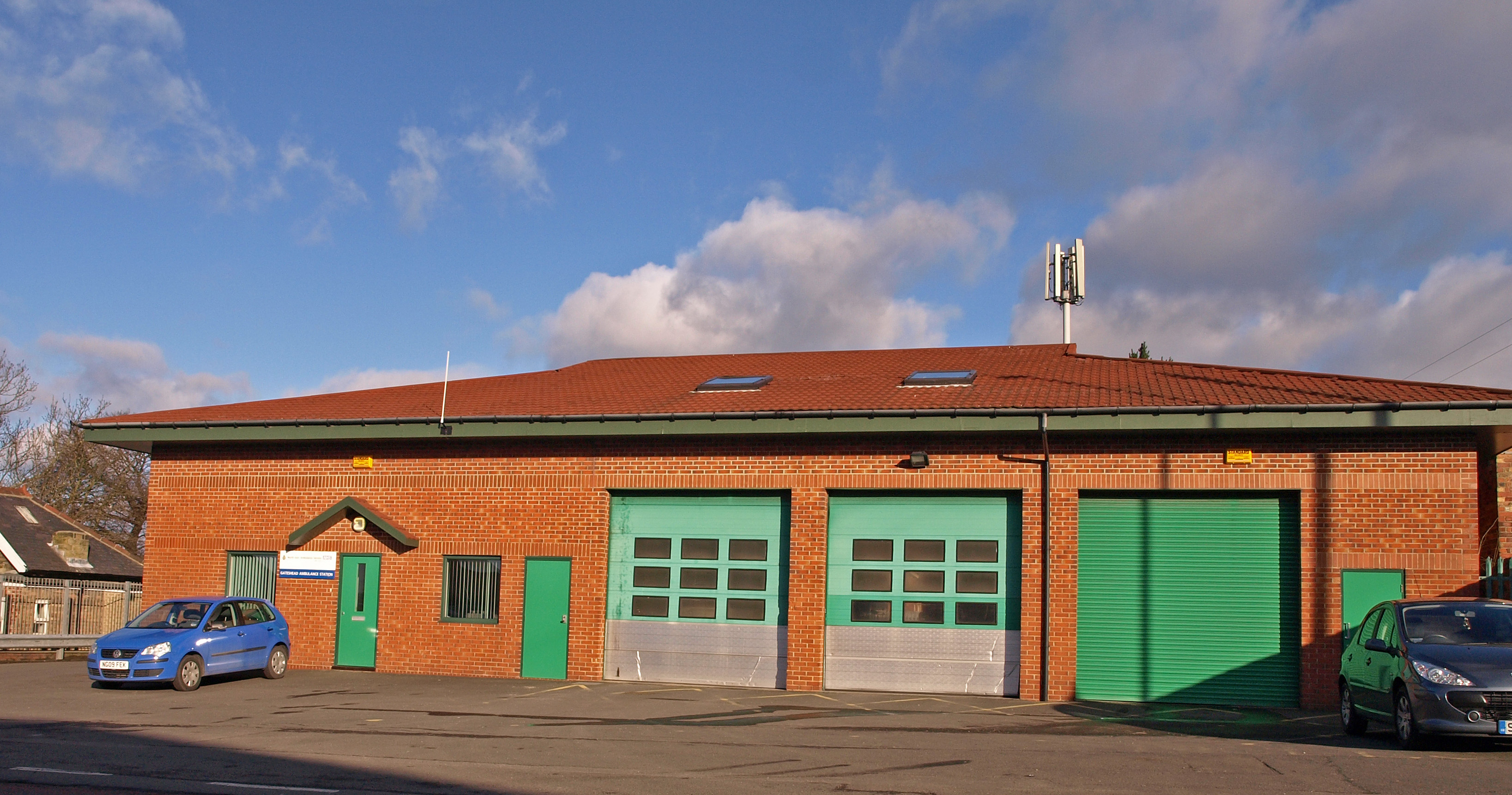
Sheriff Hill ambulance station

Home Office policing in Sheriff Hill is provided by Northumbria Police; the nearest police station is at High West Street, Gateshead. Statutory emergency fire and rescue service is provided by the Tyne and Wear Fire and Rescue Service and Sheriff Hill is served by the Gateshead East station on Dryden Road in Low Fell. Health provision is provided by the Queen Elizabeth Hospital, which is a National Health Service (NHS) hospital administered by the Gateshead Health NHS Foundation Trust. The area is served by an ambulance station adjacent to the hospital on Old Durham Road and ambulance services are provided by the North East Ambulance Service.

Public transport services are co-ordinated by the Tyne and Wear Passenger Transport Executive. Waste management is co-ordinated by the local authority, Gateshead Council, which provides refuse collections, which became fortnightly in March 2012. Sheriff Hill's distribution network operator for electricity is Northern Powergrid. Northumbrian Water supplies drinking water, which is sourced from Kielder Reservoir, and also has responsibility for waste water services.

== Bibliography ==
- Buchannan, G.S (November 1905). Report to the Local Government Board on Small-pox in Gateshead and Felling 1903–1904, in relation to Sheriff Hill Hospital. Journal of the Royal Sanitary Institute.
- Carlton, Ian Clark (1974). A Short History of Gateshead. Gateshead Corporation.
- Hair, T.H (1844). A Series of views of the Collieries in the Counties of Northumberland and Durham. London.
- Harper, Charles George (2009). The Great North Road, the Old Mail Road to Scotland. BiblioLife.
- Harrison, John (1979). Sheriff Hill: My Village. Gateshead Central Library.
- Kelly (1858). Post Office Directory of Durham.
- Lewis, Samuel (1831). A Topographical Dictionary of England. Lewis & Co.
- Manders, Francis William David (1973). A History of Gateshead. Gateshead Corporation.
- Marshall, T (1991). Gateshead Place Names and History:Miscellaneous Notes. Gateshead Central Library.
- Mackenzie, Eneas (1827). Historical Account of Newcastle-upon-Tyne: Including the Borough of Gateshead. Mackenzie and Dent.
- Mackenzie and Ross (1834). An Historical, Topographical and Descriptive View of the County Palatine of Durham. Mackenzie and Ross.
- Slater, I (1848). Royal National Commercial Directory and Topography of the Counties of Durham.
- Tegg, Thomas (1829). The London Encyclopedia. London.
- The Earl of Shaftsbury (1844). Report of the Metropolitan Commissioners in Lunacy to the Lord Chancellor. Bradbury and Evans.
- Ward (1893–94). Directory of Newcastle upon Tyne, Gateshead, North and South Shields, Jarrow, Sunderland and the adjacent villages.
- Ward (1889–90). Directory of Newcastle upon Tyne, Gateshead, North and South Shields, Jarrow, Sunderland and the adjacent village.
- Whellan, William (1855). Whellan's History, Topography and Directory of Northumberland. Whellan & Co, Manchester.
- Whitehead (1782). Newcastle and Gateshead Directory.
- Wilks (29 November 1953). New Schools Open in Sheriff Hill.
