= Sheriff's March =

Annual procession at Gateshead Fell, County Durham

The Sheriff's March was an annual procession at Gateshead Fell, County Durham.

Medieval Britain operated under a strict feudal system. Society was rigidly structured in a pyramidal form with the King (or Queen) at the apex as the highest authority in the land, ordinary citizens at the bottom with a variety of Lords, Bishops, Judges and other noblemen and landowners ranking variously in between. Allegiance and subservience to the Crown was required by all men and women at all times and on most occasions was demonstrated by the swearing of oaths. One such occasion occurred twice a year, when the Sheriff of Northumberland met with the Crown Judges who came to Newcastle upon Tyne and sat on the Assizes to hear any legal matters which required their attention. To further emphasise the importance and solemnity of these visitations, a procession was to be held prior to the official meeting of the parties.

At an inquisition at Tynemouth in 1278, it was duly declared that the King of Scotland, the Archbishop of York, the Prior of Tynemouth, the Bishop of Durham and Gilbert de Umfraville, Earl of Angus should arrange to meet with the justices prior to their entry into Newcastle, provided that they came through the county of Yorkshire first.

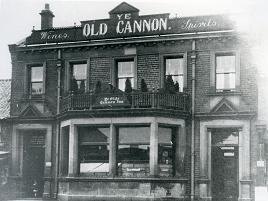
Ye Olde Cannon circa 1850, where the procession would 'light and go' to be served wine and punch. Photograph taken from Gateshead Council public archive

On the appointed day, usually a Saturday, the procession of these learned men would take place, starting in Newcastle upon Tyne before crossing the River Tyne and passing into Gateshead. After a short refreshment break,- at Sheriff Mount, the procession then made its way slowly up the old (and remarkably steep) turnpike road until all concerned parties came to the designated meeting place. This was initially established at Chile Well, but latterly the procession came to "light and go into the house".

The house in question was Ye Olde Cannon, located on the turnpike road at the crest of Gateshead Fell. This place was chosen because of the convenience of both the gentry of Northumberland and for the judges journeying from Durham, the sheriff having used the stables at Sheriff Mount - to change horse before the hill climb, this is a detached Victorian villa built and known as Sheriff Mount North & Sheriff Mount South - the large Mount stone bears presence to this fact, he rode uphill onward to the olde canon.

England|Durham]] and it was there that wine and punch were again served to the members of the precession at the expense of the Sheriffs who would wait there until the judges made their arrival. Once they had done so, all would return to Newcastle upon Tyne.

It is not known for certain whether or not Chile Well was situated on the old turnpike road, but it is certainly possible that the two meeting points were one and the same place. A well was for many years situated across the road from the Cannon and this certainly lends credence to the possibility that the sites were, in fact, the same. Intriguingly, the well was inscribed:

"As cold waters to a thirsty soul
So is good news from a far country."

This procession took place for over five hundred years, even continuing after the English Civil War in the seventeenth century had effectively destroyed the feudal system as the principal means of rule in Britain. Indeed, the procession was held until 1825 when, upon the completion of the far less steep turnpike road through Low Fell, the procession was rerouted and the meeting place became The New Cannon situated at the junction between the turnpike road and the Low Fell Road (now Beaconsfield Road and Belle Vue Bank).

In 1832, miners at the Sheriff Hill Colliery went on strike in protest of pay and the dangerous conditions at the colliery. When the Sheriff's March reached the area of Gateshead Fell, they were confronted by angry workers carrying a banner depicting a rat taking cheese from the working men Shortly after, a Commons bill in 1838 abolished such processions and so the tradition was halted and the travelling dignitaries had to be accommodated at the expense of their hosts. An attempt to revive the procession in 1845 by the High Sheriff, Ralph Carr Elison, was largely abortive and no further attempt was made.

It is as a direct result of the "Sheriff's March" that the area around Ye Olde Cannon and the old turnpike road became known as Sheriff Hill.

== Bibliography ==
- Hair, T.H (1844). A Series of views of the Collieries in the Counties of Northumberland and Durham. London. ISBN 0-946865-07-8.
- Manders, Francis William David (1973). A History of Gateshead. Gateshead Corporation. ISBN 0-901273-02-3.
- Marshall, T (1991). Gateshead Place Names and History:Miscellaneous Notes. Gateshead Central Library.
- McKenzie, Eneas (1827). Historical Account of Newcastle-upon-Tyne: Including the Borough of Gateshead. McKenzie and Dent. ISBN 978-1-144-29746-4.
