= St John's Church, Gateshead Fell =

Coordinates: 54.9383°N 1.5885°W

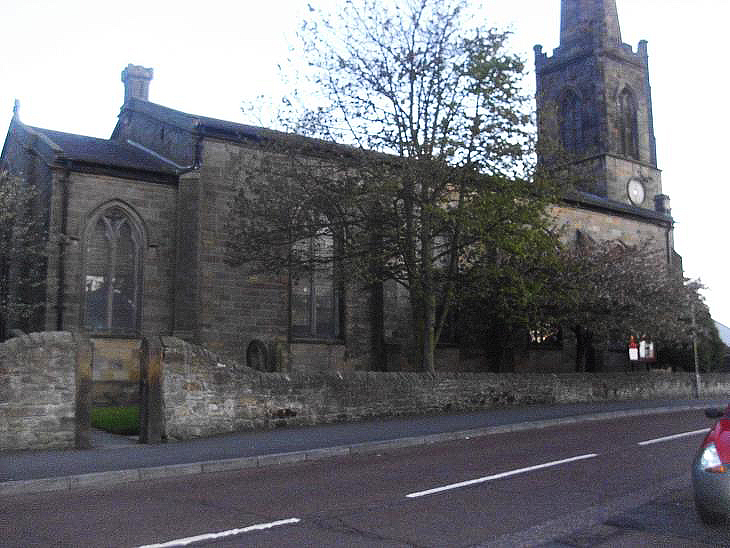

- Location in Tyne and Wear
- OS grid reference: NZ 265 605
- Location: Church Road, Sheriff Hill, Gateshead, Tyne and Wear
- Country: England
- Denomination: Anglican
- Website: St John, Gateshead Fell

History
- Status: Parish church
- Dedication: John the Evangelist

Architecture
- Functional status: Active
- Heritage designation: Grade II
- Designated: 26 April 1950
- Architect: John Ions
- Architectural type: Church
- Style: Gothic Revival
- Groundbreaking: 1824
- Completed: 1825
- Construction cost: £2,742

Specifications
- Materials: Stone, slate roof

Administration
- Province: York
- Diocese: Durham
- Archdeaconry: Sunderland
- Deanery: Gateshead
- Parish: Gateshead Fell

Clergy
- Vicar: Revd Danie Lindley Yvonne Stonebank

St John's Church, Gateshead Fell, is in Church Road, Sheriff Hill, Gateshead, Tyne and Wear, England. It is an active Anglican parish church in the deanery of Gateshead, the archdeaconry of Sunderland, and the diocese of Durham. The church is recorded in the National Heritage List for England as a designated Grade II listed building. It was a Commissioners' church, having received a grant towards its construction from the Church Building Commission. The church stands at the highest point in Gateshead.

== History ==
Gateshead Fell Church Act 1809
- Act of Parliament
- Parliament of the United Kingdom
- Long title: An Act for building a Church on Gateshead Fell, in the Parish of Gateshead.
- Citation: 49 Geo. 3. c. cxvi

Dates
- Royal assent: 27 May 1809

Text of statute as originally enacted

Section 12 of the Gateshead Inclosure Act 1809 (49 Geo. 3. c. cxxxv) set aside an acre of land at Gateshead Fell to build a church, and another act of Parliament passed the same day, the Gateshead Fell Church Act 1809 (49 Geo. 3. c. cxvi) decreed that there be a church built on it. A grant of £1,000 (equivalent to £90,000 in 2025) was given towards its construction by the Church Building Commission. Designed by John Ions, the foundation stone was laid by Rev. John Collinson, at a "lofty eminence" on Sour Milk Hill, on 13 May 1824. Building continued into the next year and the church was consecrated on 30 August 1825. The total cost was £2,742 (equivalent to £260,000 in 2025). In the 1990s alterations were carried out at the rear of the church to create meeting rooms, toilets, and a kitchen.

... in the first Place, the said Commissioners shall set out and allot unto and for the Rector for the Time being of the Parish of Gateshead aforesaid, and his Successors, such Plot or Parcel of Land, not exceeding One Acre, as in the Judgement of the said Commissioners shall be most conveniently situate and best adapted for the Scite of a Church and Church Yard or Cemetery, for the Use of the Inhabitants of the said Common or Waste... — Gateshead Inclosure Act 1809, section 12

== Architecture ==
St John's is constructed in ashlar stone with a Welsh slate roof. Its architectural style is Gothic Revival. The plan of the church consists of a nave, a short chancel, and a west tower with a spire. The tower also has diagonal buttresses and an embattled parapet. The windows along the sides of the church are lancets. The two-manual organ was made by Harrison and Harrison. It replaced an organ made in about 1929 by Blackett and Howden, and was installed in 2000. The organ was formerly in St Aidan's Church, Blackhill, Consett.

== See also ==
- List of Commissioners' churches in Northeast and Northwest England
