= Gateshead Fell =

Area and parish in Gateshead, United Kingdom

Coordinates: 54.934°N 1.582°W

Gateshead Fell was a district in County Durham, England. It was located on the immediate border of the town of Gateshead, 2.3 miles from the city of Newcastle upon Tyne. Once described as a "dark, spongy moor", Gateshead Fell existed in some form for almost nine hundred years before it was enclosed in 1809 and divided into a number of villages, notably Sheriff Hill, Low Fell and Wrekenton, which were themselves absorbed by the urban expansion of Gateshead and were officially incorporated into the Metropolitan Borough of Gateshead with the passing of the Local Government Act in 1974.

== History ==
Gateshead Fell, a constituent part of the ancient County of Durham, took its name from nearby Gateshead and the fact that the area was "a fell or common contigious to it". It has existed in some form for over one thousand years, but little of that early history survives today. Perhaps the most notable occurrence was that in 1068 when Malcolm, King of Scotland, marched across the Scottish border to challenge the authority of William the Conqueror. Malcolm, accompanied by "a retinue of native insurgents and foreign auxiliaries", was met by William's men and was decisively beaten. Little of further note is recorded until approximately 1647, when Gateshead Fell was surveyed and found to contain some 1,300 acres. In that lay much of what is now part of the Metropolitan Borough of Gateshead. The northern boundary reached Whinney House and Beacon House, to the south came Wrekendyke, to the east lay the old Roman road and to the west was Chowdene, now ostensibly part of Low Fell, along with what is now Eighton Banks (near Wrekenton). Each boundary was marked by a cross, with some engraved with the inscription "I, Christ".

By the middle of the eighteenth century, Gateshead Fell had become a place of considerable notoriety. Indeed, when John Wesley arrived in Gateshead in February 1745, he noted that:

"It was past eight before we got to Gateshead Fell, which appeared a great, pathless waste of white. The snow filling up and covering all the roads, we were at a loss as how to proceed, when an honest man of Newcastle overtook and guided us to safe into the town. Many a rough journey have I had before, but one like this I never had..."

By the turn of the 18th century, the essential character of Gateshead Fell had changed very little. Herbage still flourished (composed of "whins and briars") and this formed the modest means for a smattering of tinkers and cuddies who comprised the majority of the population of the Fell.

== Industry ==
Gateshead Fell was dominated by heavy industry. One of the predominant industries was on the fell was quarrying, with one observer noting:

"The grindstones from the quarries here, known as "Newcastle grindstones," have been celebrated for centuries, and are exported to all parts of the world."

Tyneside has a rich coal mining heritage and Gateshead Fell was no different in this regard. Roger de Fulthorpe and others, in 1368, worked the coal-mines in "Gateside Moore." At one time, there were "eight pittes on Gateside Low Fell," which accounts for the immense extent of pit-waste on this part of the Fell previous to the division.

Ellison Main Colliery (sometimes referred to as Sheriff Hill Colliery) was situated at the summit of Gateshead Fell (now the boundary between Sheriff Hill and Low Fell). Opened in 1793, ownership of the mine changed hands a number of times: in 1840 the lease was granted to "messers Hutchinson and Lamb under Cuthbert Ellison" whilst by the time of the colliery closure some eighty years later, ownership appears to have been transferred to Heworth Coal Company Ltd.

As a result of the Great Hartley Disaster in 1862, legislation was passed which required all collieries have two main exits. As a result, Sheriff Hill Colliery operated two main shafts- Fanny Pit and Isabella Pit. Fanny Pit was some 535 feet above sea level and plumbed a depth of some 804 feet (as of 1894). Isabella, on the other hand, was slightly shallower with a total shaft depth of 738 feet (as of 1894).

Contemporary evidence provides that the operation of the colliery ran thus:

"The coals are drawn at two shafts by an engine of about 30 horses' power, which raises three corves at once. Another engine, of the same power, is employed in pumping the water to a height of 30 fathoms from the bottom, where it is discharged into a drift of about 1¼ mile in length, and is finally drawn out by an engine at the Low Fell. The waggon-way from the Isabella Pit to the Tyne is about 3 miles in length, and the waggons are transmitted along it chiefly by means of inclined planes..

Mining during the eighteenth and nineteenth centuries was notoriously difficult and often resulted in disasters causing numerous fatalities. Sheriff Hill Colliery suffered a number of such incidents, notably on 27 December 1793 when fourteen workers lost their lives in an explosion. On 19 July 1819, when a further explosion caused the deaths of thirty-five men.

The Colliery closed in 1926 and never re-opened.

Far less is known about Hope Pit, another mine which operated in Gateshead Fell (more specifically) and which is evidenced in Ordnance Survey maps up to 1919, but no such listing is evidenced in the map of 1939. This was situated in the area now known as Blue Quarries Road and Hewson Street, both of which are now residential areas, and very little documentary evidence regarding this pit survives today.

== Social conditions ==
=== Criminality ===
The Fell, and particularly the turnpike road, had, in spite of its natural beauty, earned itself a reputation as something of a haven for neer-do-wells and a place of considerable danger for those unaccustomed to it.

In 1880, the Monthly Chronicle reflected that:

“Gateshead Fell, as the name implies, was once a wild common, over a portion of which lay the road between Durham and Newcastle. The loneliness of the bleak moorland was quite guile enough to invest it with terror to travellers a hundred years ago and occasionally there were incidents that served greatly to enhance the evil repute of the locality ”

In 1770, Robert Hazlett, a highwayman, was convicted of committing two acts of highway robbery in the same night. In the first instance, he attempted to steal a watch and coins from a lady named Miss Benson. After succeeding in obtaining from the woman her coin purse, Hazlett continued along the turnpike and encountered a postman, who, despite having been forewarned by Miss Benson, was 'lured into a trap' and robbed. Hazlett was tried within one week of his arrest at the Newcastle Assizes and was convicted. He was sentenced to hang until dead. His remains were hung on chains near a pond on the Fell as a warning to other potential, would-be criminals. That pond, named Hazlett’s Pond in dubious honour of the highwayman, has since been drained and enclosed.

The Fell was also reportedly the home of minor criminal gangs. Local press reports referred often to the actions of a notorious family in the name of Clark and the actions and impact of the so-called Gateshead Fell-Bishop Auckland Gang have been scrutinised. However, the gang had ‘a tenuous identity’ and, despite "many arrests, few serious crimes were confirmed in court". It is true, however, that Walter Clark and his wife, Jane Trotter, lived on the Fell and a number of pickpockets arrested around 1780 were associated with that house. The Newcastle Chronicle reported in 1786 that one of the gang, Francis Russell, was ‘whipped around the Sandhill’. A number of other individuals were pursued for other minor acts of criminality, such as stealing geese or killing sheep. These incidents gained something of a local reputation for individuals such as Thomas Colpits, who was arrested on several occasions and found himself reported in the local press.

The modus operandi of these ‘gangs’ was that “they often changed their names and frequently rendezvous at the Crown and the Cannon at Gateshead Fell and had ware rooms for their stolen goods...” It seems likely that these acts were the sporadic acts of associated ‘tinkers’ rather than an organised gang of criminals: ‘there was no evidence of definite ringleaders or organisation’.

=== Religion ===
Gateshead Fell was once one of the strongest seats of Methodism in the whole of England. This is due almost entirely to the visit of John Wesley, the joint founder of the Methodist movement, in March 1743. It is said that he was returning from Pelton to Newcastle when "...he observed a little village called Chowden [now Chowdene], which they told me consisted of colliers only. I resolved to preach there as soon as possible, for these are sinners and need repentance." He duly returned on 8 March 1743, was moved by the amazement of the local children (who he described as "neither clothed or naked" to his presence and duly began his preachings. In doing so, Wesley ensured that Methodism was bourne on the Fell. Curiously, the Gateshead Fell movement quickly disassociated itself from the Newcastle circuit and formed itself into a strong, separate existence so that by 1840, well attended Wesleyan services were being held in Carr Hill, Low Fell and in Sheriff Hill

== Demise ==
=== Boundary disputes ===
Gateshead Fell has been described as 'uninhabitable waste' which made the frequent boundary disputes somewhat perplexing. In 1595, for example, when commissioners riding on behalf of the Bishop of Durham rode along the boundary they were harangued by local residents and then confronted by the primary local landowners, William Gascoigne and John Hedworth, who rode on horseback in a fury to confront the transgressors and threatened death by rapier upon all of them. The commissioners evidently believed them, and duly fled.

Rather more amicable challenges to the boundaries came through the courts, including that raised by the Bishop of Durham against Sir Henry Liddell in 1714. The Bishop of Durham, suspected of having a close friendship with the notorious Jacobite Thomas Forster, duly lost his case on appeal in 1717, the court evidently finding the evidence of Liddell, a staunch Royalist, much more to their liking.

On no fewer than three separate occasions, in 1691, 1735 and 1778, were recommendations made to enclose Gateshead Fell, but none of them made it any further than a mere proposal. These proposals, raised by a succession of Lords, were repeatedly rebuffed by the efforts of the local borough holders. Yet in spite of the official failures to enclose the land, It seems likely that unofficial encroachments must have slowly nibbled away at the fell, for by the time enclosure was actually undertaken in 1809, the size of Gateshead Fell had officially shrunken to a mere 631 acres.

=== Enclosure ===
Gateshead Inclosure Act 1809
- Act of Parliament
- Parliament of the United Kingdom
- Long title: An Act for inclosing Lands in the Parish of Gateshead, in the County of Durham.
- Citation: 49 Geo. 3. c. cxxxv

Dates
- Royal assent: 27 May 1809

Text of statute as originally enacted

In 1809 the Gateshead Inclosure Act 1809 (49 Geo. 3. c. cxxxv) was finally obtained ordering the enclosure of Gateshead Fell. Enclosure was completed in 1822. Commissioners were appointed to settle claims in land and to apportion the Fell accordingly. The commissioners were empowered to set out such parts as they pleased for roads, drains, quarries, watering places, and one acre as a church-yard and site for building St John's Church: of the residue, one-sixteenth part was appropriated to the bishop of Durham as lord of the manor, and another sixteenth part to the boroughholders and freemen of Gateshead, in compensation for their exclusive right of letting stints: the rest of the Fell (except a part for making two waggon-ways) was divided amongst persons having right of common. The whole Fell contained 631 acres, 0 roods, 21 poles, exclusive of roads, quarries and wells.

This proved a lengthy process and dozens of contested issues were raised in court. Once these had been settled, plans were laid for the requisition and construction of wells, quarries, drains, roads, watering places and other essential requirements. New roads were to be built on what is now Blue Quarries Road, Church Road and Windy Nook Road to supplement the turnpike road which was to remain in spite of the development of a new turnpike road along the route which is now Durham Road, running from Newcastle to Durham through Low Fell. The new road was completed in 1827. A well was also to be provided at Blue Quarries.

A number of the existing residential properties on the Fell were demolished, including sixteen at Sour Milk Hill, Sheriff Hill; an act which apparently had caused the commissioner considerable distress, with one Thomas Bell noting:

...the pulling down of these cottages was one of the most unpleasant duties of the Commissioners, the greater number having to be taken down by force.

Progress was slow, with the last allotment land disputes not settled until almost 1830, but by the time of completion, Gateshead Fell was, at last and after centuries of dispute, enclosed. The divisions which enclosure created were to prove more or less settled: so much so that almost two hundred years later, the old Fell remains divided almost exactly as enclosed, and it was from the enclosure sprang the birth of villages (notably Sheriff Hill and Low Fell) which form part of the metropolitan borough of Gateshead today.
