= Newcastle Journal (1739–1788) =

English newspaper

The Newcastle Journal was a folio-sized weekly newspaper published in Newcastle-upon-Tyne from 1739 to 1788.

== Establishment ==
William Cuthbert and the Quaker printer Isaac Thompson (1703–1776) printed a prospectus for a new Newcastle newspaper in January 1739. The enterprise, they announced, would be sustained by strict political impartiality:

We declare we have no Design to enter into the Service of a Party, not to set our selves up in Opposition to any present Paper, or Publisher of News; but only to carry on an Affair, in a Manner as useful and entertaining to the Publick in general as any thing of its Kind extant. We shall therefore cautiously avoid the Rancour and Ill-nature of all Factions, Sects, political Distinctions, and particular Interests; tho' we shall make an impartial Use of every Side and Party to come at the Truth, and omit nothing in our Power, either of Information, or agreeable Amusement.

— Cuthbert and Thompson, Proposals for publishing a news-paper, to be entitled, The Newcastle Journal.

Facing down mockery from the existing Newcastle Courant, the first issue of the Newcastle Journal appeared on 7 April 1739. By the summer the editors claimed they were selling "nearly 2000 of these Papers weekly". They also claimed a wide regional circulation, with agents in towns as far afield as Berwick and Newhaven, Derbyshire.

== Politics ==
In the competition between the Journal and the Courant, each newspaper "consciously struck a balance between sales and politics". The Newcastle Journal robustly defended its right to print opposition speeches, such as the April 1740 speech against the government by John Campbell, 2nd Duke of Argyll, in the House of Lords. In 1742 the newspaper included an anonymous criticism of David Hume's essay on the character of Robert Walpole, to which Hume replied in The Scots Magazine.

== Later history ==
Thompson continued printing the Journal until the end of his life, though he also published the Newcastle General Magazine from 1746 to 1760. The printer Thomas Slack worked with Thompson at the Newcastle Journal throughout the 1750s. However, the two men fell out, and in 1764 Slack attempted his own weekly newspaper, the Newcastle Chronicle, in competition with the Newcastle Journal.

In 1773 the Newcastle Journal claimed circulation over an area with a 600-mile circumference. After Thompson's death in 1776, the paper was bought by T. Robson and Co, who printed it from 1778 to 1788. The paper ceased publication in April 1788.
