= British heavy tanks of the First World War =

Type of combat tank

British heavy tanks of WWI
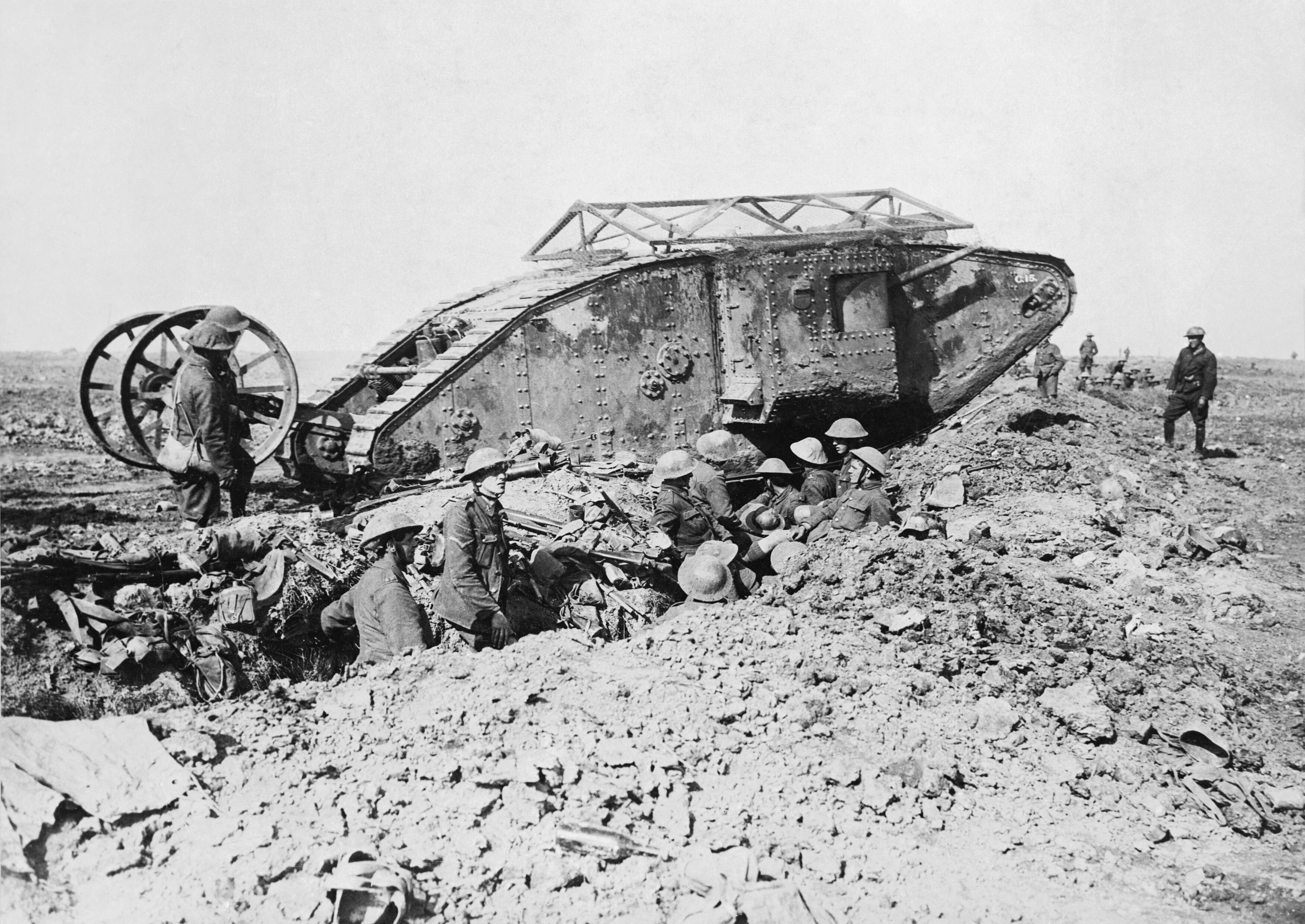
- A British Mark I "male" tank near Thiepval on 25 September 1916, fitted with wire mesh to deflect grenades and the initial steering tail, shown raised. Photograph by Ernest Brooks
- Type: Heavy tank
- Place of origin: United Kingdom

Service history
- In service: (Mk I) from 1916
- Used by: United Kingdom (Mk I–IX); Germany (Mk IV); Japan (Mk IV); Russia (White movement) (Mk V); Soviet Union (Mk V); United States (Mk V, V*, VIII); France (Mk V*); Canada (Mk V, V*)
- Wars: First World War; Russian Civil War; German Revolution of 1918–19

Production history
- Designer: William Tritton; Major Walter Gordon Wilson
- Designed: 1915
- Manufacturer: (Mk I) William Foster & Co. of Lincoln; Metropolitan Carriage, Birmingham
- Produced: (Mk I) 1916
- No. built: 150
- Variants: Mark II, Mark III, Mark IV, Mark V, Mark V*, Mark V**, Mark VI, Mark VII, Mark VIII, Mark IX, Mark X, Gun Carrier Mark I

Specifications (Tank, Mark I)
- Mass: Male: 28 long tons (28 t); Female: 27 long tons (27 t)
- Length: 32 ft 6 in (9.91 m) with tail; 25 ft 5 in (7.75 m) without
- Width: 13 ft 9 in (4.19 m) [male]; 14 ft 4 1/2 in (4.38 m) [female]
- Height: 8 ft 2 in (2.49 m)
- Crew: 8 (commander/brakesman, driver, two gearsmen and four gunners)
- Armour: 0.24–0.47 in (6–12 mm)
- Main armament: Male: Two Hotchkiss 6 pdr QF; Female: Four .303 in Vickers machine guns
- Secondary armament: Male: Three .303 in Hotchkiss machine guns; Female: One .303 in Hotchkiss machine gun
- Engine: Daimler-Knight 6-cylinder sleeve-valve 16-litre petrol engine 105 horsepower (78 kW)
- Power/weight: Male: 3.7 hp/LT (2.7 kW/t); Female: 4.0 hp/LT (2.9 kW/t)
- Transmission: primary gearbox: 2 forward and 1 reverse; secondary: 2 speeds
- Suspension: 26 unsprung rollers
- Fuel capacity: 50 imperial gallons (230 L; 60 US gal) internal
- Operational range: 23.6 miles (38.0 km) radius of action, 6.2 hours endurance
- Maximum speed: 3.7 mph (6.0 km/h) maximum

British heavy tanks were a series of related armoured fighting vehicles developed by the UK during the First World War. The Mark I was the world's first tank, a tracked, armed, and armoured vehicle, to enter combat. The name "tank" was initially a code name to maintain secrecy and disguise its true purpose. The tank was developed in 1915 to break the stalemate of trench warfare. It could survive the machine gun and small-arms fire in "no man's land", travel over difficult terrain, crush barbed wire, and cross trenches to assault fortified enemy positions with powerful armament. Tanks also carried supplies and troops.

British heavy tanks are distinguished by a rhomboidal shape with a high climbing face of the track, designed to cross the wide and deep trenches prevalent on the battlefields of the Western Front. Due to the height necessary for this shape, an armed turret would have made the vehicle too tall and unstable. Instead, the main armament was arranged in sponsons at the side of the vehicle. The prototype, named "Mother", mounted a 6-pounder (57 mm) cannon and a Hotchkiss machine gun at each side. Later, subtypes were produced with machine guns only, which were designated "Female", while the original version with the protruding 6-pounder was called "Male".

The Mark I entered service in August 1916, and was first used in action on the morning of 15 September 1916 during the Battle of Flers-Courcelette, part of the Somme Offensive. With the exception of the few interim Mark II and Mark III tanks, it was followed by the largely similar Mark IV, which first saw combat in June 1917. The Mark IV was used en masse, about 460 tanks, at the Battle of Cambrai in November 1917. The Mark V, with a much improved transmission, entered service in mid-1918. More than two thousand British heavy tanks were produced. Manufacture was discontinued at the end of the war.

== Development ==
The Mark I was a development of Little Willie, the experimental tank built for the Landship Committee by Lieutenant Walter Wilson of the Royal Naval Air Service and William Tritton of William Foster Co., between July and September 1915. It was designed by Wilson in response to problems with tracks and trench-crossing ability discovered during the development of Little Willie. A gun turret above the hull would have made the centre of gravity too high when climbing a German trench parapet (which were typically 4 ft, 1.2 m high), so the tracks were arranged in a rhomboidal form around the hull and the guns were put in sponsons on the sides of the tank. The reworked design was also able to meet the Army requirement to be able to cross an 8 ft (2.4 m) wide trench.

A mockup of Wilson's idea was shown to the Landship Committee when they viewed the demonstration of Little Willie. At about this time, the Army's General Staff was persuaded to become involved and supplied representatives to the committee. Through these contacts Army requirements for armour and armament made their way into the design. The prototype Mark I, ready in December 1915, was called "Mother" (also known at various times as "The Wilson Machine", "Big Willie", and officially "His Majesty's Land Ship Centipede" (Note: Only the 'HMLS Centipede' nameplate of Mother survives)). Mother was successfully demonstrated to the Landship Committee in early 1916; it was run around a course simulating the front including trenches, parapets, craters and barbed wire obstacles. The demonstration was repeated on 2 February before the cabinet ministers and senior members of the Army. Kitchener, the Secretary of State for War, was skeptical but the rest were impressed. Lloyd George, at the time Minister of Munitions, arranged for his Ministry to be responsible for tank production.

The Landship Committee was re-constituted as the "Tank Supply Committee" under the chairmanship of Albert Stern; Ernest Swinton, who had promoted the idea of the tank from the Army angle was also a member. General Haig sent a staff officer (Hugh Elles) to act as his liaison to the Supply Committee. Swinton would become the head of the new arm, and Elles the commander of the tanks in France.

The first order for tanks was placed on 12 February 1916, and a second on 21 April. Fosters built 37 (all "male"), and Metropolitan Carriage, Wagon, and Finance Company, of Birmingham, 113 (38 "male" and 75 "female"), a total of 150.

When the news of the first use of the tanks emerged, Lloyd George commented,

Well, we must not expect too much from them but so far they have done very well, and don't you think that they reflect some credit on those responsible for them? It is really to Mr Winston Churchill that the credit is due more than to anyone else. He took up with enthusiasm the idea of making them a long time ago, and he met with many difficulties. He converted me, and at the Ministry of Munitions he went ahead and made them. The admiralty experts were invaluable, and gave the greatest possible assistance. They are, of course, experts in the matter of armour plating. Major Stern, a business man at the Ministry of Munitions had charge of the work of getting them built, and he did the task very well. Col Swinton and others also did valuable work.

— David Lloyd George

== Description ==
The Mark I was a rhomboid vehicle with a low centre of gravity and long track length, able to negotiate broken ground and cross trenches. The main armament was carried in sponsons on the hull sides.

The hull was undivided internally; the crew shared the same space as the engine. The environment inside was extremely unpleasant; since ventilation was inadequate, the atmosphere was contaminated with poisonous carbon monoxide, fuel and oil vapours from the engine, and cordite fumes from the weapons. Temperatures inside could reach 50 °C (122 °F). Men sometimes lost consciousness inside the tank but more often collapsed when getting out into fresh air. The symptoms were suggestive of carbon monoxide poisoning but the high temperatures inside together with humidity were also identified as a possible cause.

To counter the danger of bullet splash or fragments knocked off the inside of the hull, crews were issued with leather-and-chainmail masks. A leather helmet was also issued, to protect the head against projections inside the tank. Gas masks were standard issue as well, as they were to all soldiers at this point in the war due to use of chemical weapons by both sides. (Note: the infantry box respirator reduced vision too much and crews were given a variant that covered mouth and nose only which was worn with separate goggles.) The side armour of 8 mm initially made them largely immune to small arms fire, but could be penetrated by the recently developed armour-piercing K bullets (introduced mid-1917). There was also the danger of being overrun by infantry and attacked with grenades. The next generation had thicker armour, making them nearly immune to the K bullets. In response, the Germans developed the 13.2 mm Mauser 1918 T-Gewehr anti-tank rifle (introduced in mid-1918), and also a Geballte Ladung ("bunched charge") – several Stielhandgranate stick grenades bundled together for a much bigger explosion.

A near hit by an artillery or mortar shell could cause the fuel tanks (which were placed high in the front horns of the track frames either side of the drivers' area, to allow gravity feed) to burst open; a direct hit by any sort of artillery shell was more than enough to penetrate the armor and destroy the vehicle. Incinerated crews were removed by special Salvage Companies, who also salvaged damaged tanks.

Steering was difficult, controlled by varying the speed of the two tracks. Four of the crew, two drivers (one of whom also acted as commander; he operated the brakes, the other the primary gearbox) and two "gearsmen" (one for the secondary gears of each track) were needed to control direction and speed, the latter never more than a walking pace. As the noise inside was deafening, the driver, after setting the primary gear box, communicated with the gearsmen with hand signals, first getting their attention by hitting the engine block with a heavy spanner. For slight turns, the driver could use the steering tail: an enormous contraption dragged behind the tank consisting of two large wheels, each of which could be blocked by pulling a steel cable causing the whole vehicle to slide in the same direction. If the engine stalled, the gearsmen would use the starting handle – a large crank between the engine and the gearbox. Many of these vehicles broke down in the heat of battle making them an easy target for German gunners. There was no wireless (radio); communication with command posts was by means of two pigeons, which had their own small exit hatch in the sponsons, or by runners. Because of the noise and vibration, early experiments had shown that radios were impractical, therefore lamps, flags, semaphore, coloured discs, and the carrier pigeons were part of the standard equipment of the various marks.

During the First World War, British propaganda made frequent use of tanks, portraying them as a wonder weapon that would quickly win the war. They were featured in films and popular songs.

== Training ==
British tank crews came from other areas of the military, including infantry, cavalry, Machine Gun Corps, Flying Corps, Service Corps, and Royal Navy. Gunnery training occurred on the French coast, while driving instruction occurred on old German trenches near the front line. Tank Corps members were warned that poor performers would go to the front with the infantry, which the soldiers – having escaped what one described as "a horrible nightmare out of which we had just passed" – feared.

== Markings ==
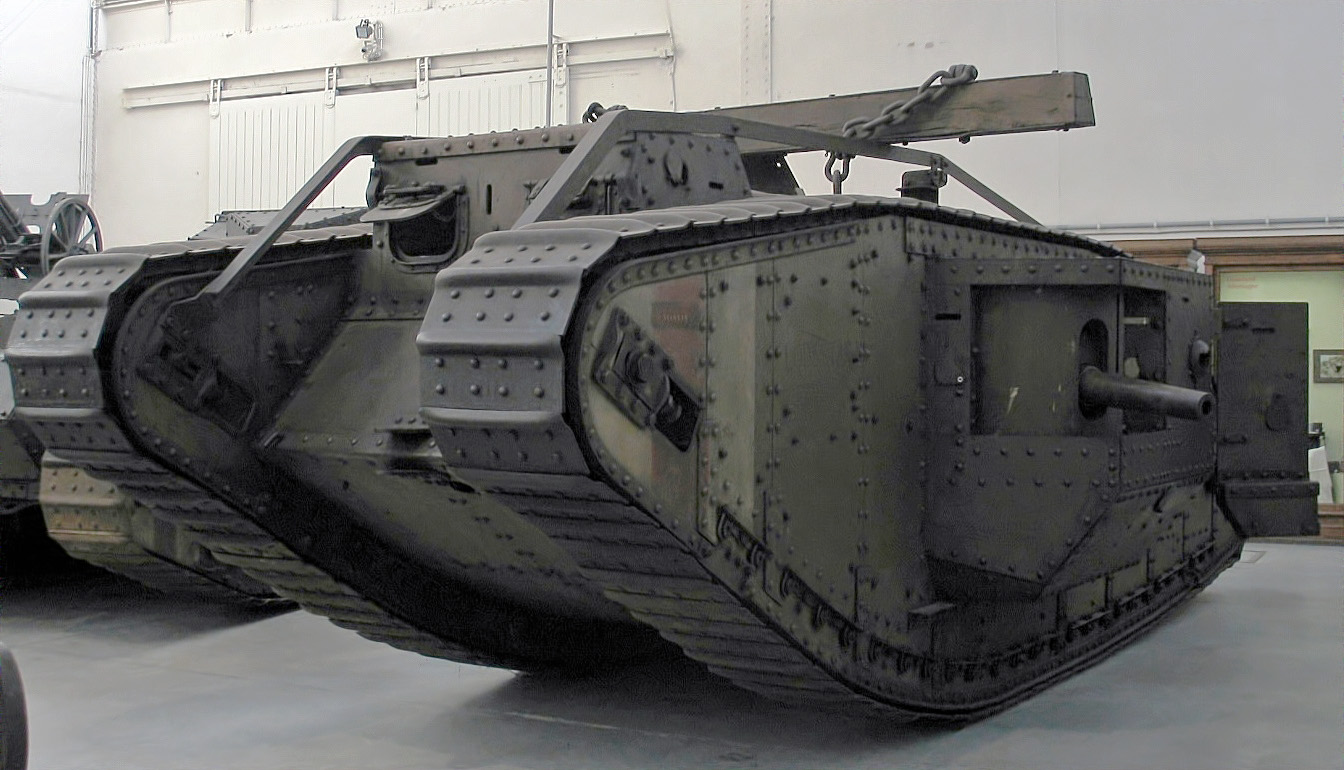
The Mark IV tank Lodestar III at the Belgian Royal Museum of the Army, Brussels (2005). This tank retains its original paint.

When first deployed, British tanks were painted with a four-colour camouflage scheme devised by the artist Solomon Joseph Solomon. It was found that they quickly got covered with mud, rendering elaborate camouflage paint schemes superfluous. In late 1916, the Solomon scheme was abandoned and tanks were painted with a single shade of dark brown.

At the rear of the tank, a three, four or five-digit serial number was painted in white or yellow at the factory. At the front there was a large tactical marking, a prefix letter indicating the company or battalion, and a number (training tanks had no letter, but three numbers). Some tanks had their tactical number painted on the roof for air recognition. Later, vertical red and white stripes were painted on the front to aid recognition after the Germans began deploying captured British tanks.

Tanks were often given individual names and these were sometimes painted on the outside. A small handful were known to carry artwork (similar to aircraft nose art).

== Variants ==
The first tanks were known as the Mark I after the subsequent designs were introduced. Mark Is that were armed with two 6 pounder guns and three .303 Hotchkiss machine guns were called "Male" tanks; those with four Vickers machine guns and one Hotchkiss were called "Female". Ernest Swinton is credited with inventing the terms.

To aid steering, a pair of large wheels were added behind the tank. These were not as effective as hoped and were subsequently dropped.

The subsequent Mark II, III, IV, and V, and later tanks, all bear a strong resemblance to Mother.

=== Mark I ===
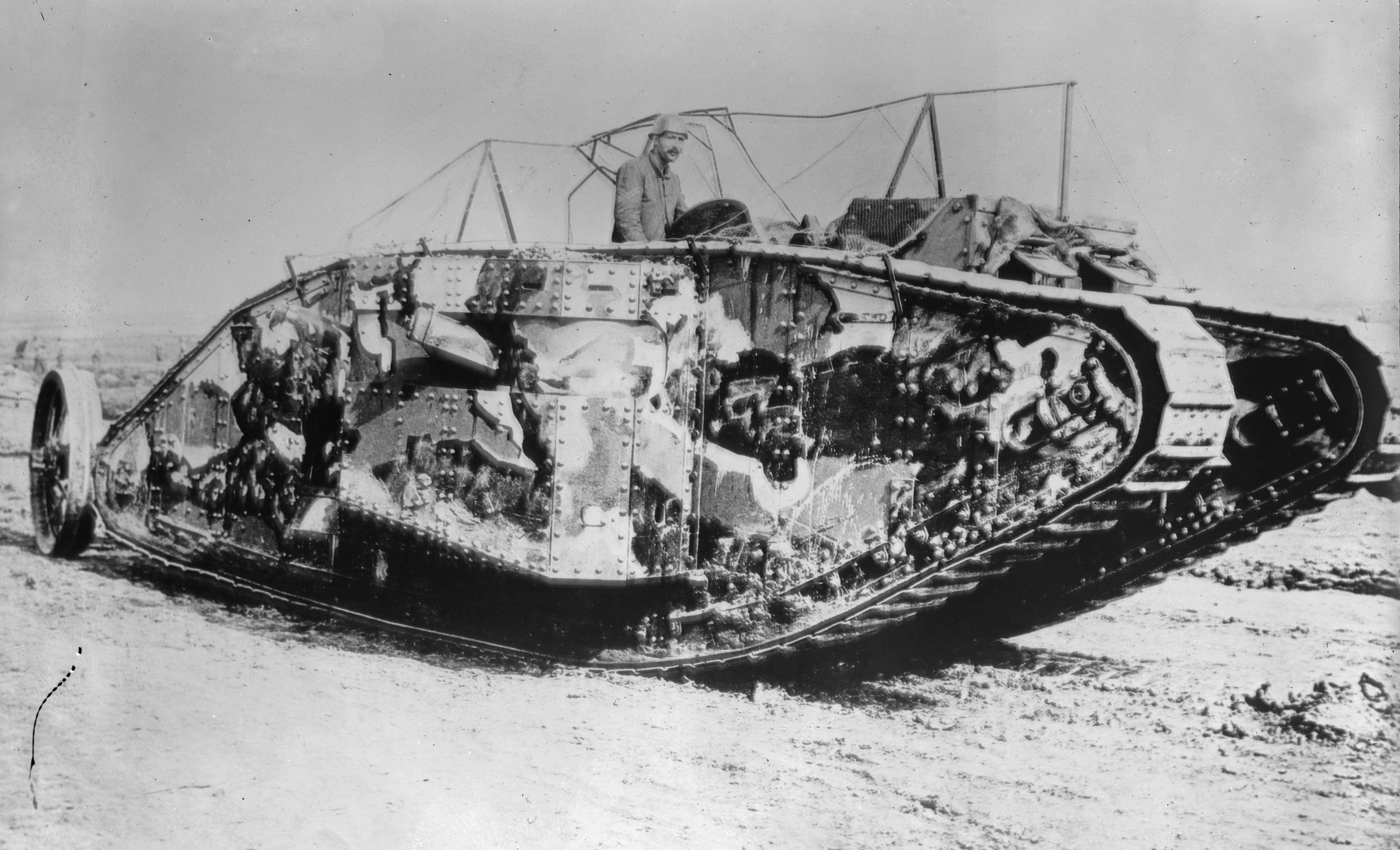
British Mark I tank with the Solomon camouflage scheme

- Crew: 8
- Combat Weight: 31.4 tons (28.4 tonnes)
- Armour: 0.23–0.47 in (5.8–11.9 mm)
- Armament: two 6-pounder QF, three Hotchkiss Machine Guns

The Gun Carrier Mark I was a separate design, intended to carry a field gun or howitzer that could be fired from the vehicle. In service, it was mostly used for carrying supplies and ammunition. Forty-eight of them were built.

Initial production of the Mark I was to be by Fosters and Metropolitan: 25 from Fosters and 75 from Metropolitan, which had greater capacity in Wednesbury at the Old Park site of the Patent Shaft Company, a subsidiary of the Metropolitan. Metropolitan also received an order for a further 50 so that the Army would be able to raise six tank companies of 25 tanks each and set up further production under their Oldbury Wagon and Carriage Company. As there were not enough 6-pounder guns available for all 150 tanks, it was decided to equip half of them with just machine guns. A new sponson design with two Vickers machine guns in rotating shields was produced.

Later in the war, when newer tanks came into use, some Mark Is were converted to be used for carrying supplies. A few Female Mark Is were used as mobile wireless stations by installation of a wireless transmitter. The radio could only be operated once the tank had stopped and a very tall mast erected, which carried the aerial array.

=== Mark II ===
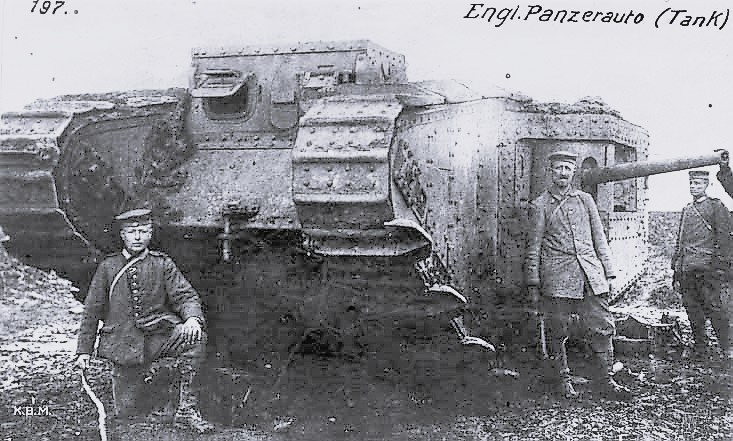
Mark II; tank no. 799 captured near Arras on 11 April 1917

The Mark II incorporated minor improvements over the Mark I. With the Army declaring the Mark I still insufficiently developed for use, the Mark II (for which orders were first placed in July) would continue to be built, but would be used only for training. Due to this intended role, they were supposedly clad in unhardened steel, though some doubt was cast on this claim in early 1917. Initially, 20 were shipped to France and 25 remained at the training ground at Wool, Dorset in Britain; the remaining five were kept for use as test vehicles. As the promised Mark IV tanks had not arrived by early 1917, it was decided, despite the protestations of Stern (see below), to ship the 25 training vehicles in Britain to France, where they joined the other 20 Mark IIs and 15 Mark Is at the Battle of Arras in April 1917. The Germans were able to pierce the armour of both the Mark I and Mark II tanks at Arras with their armour-piercing machine gun ammunition.

The Mark II was built from December 1916 to January 1917 by Foster & Co and Metropolitan (25 Male and 25 Female respectively).

Five Mark IIs were taken for experiments on improved powerplants and transmission. They were provided to firms to show what improvements they could make over the Mark I system in an open competition. In the demonstrations held in March 1917, only three of them were able to compete alongside Mother, which had been fitted with a Daimler petrol-electric system. Wilson's epicyclic gear system, which replaced the secondary gear and the gearsmen, was clearly superior and adopted in later designs.

=== Mark III ===
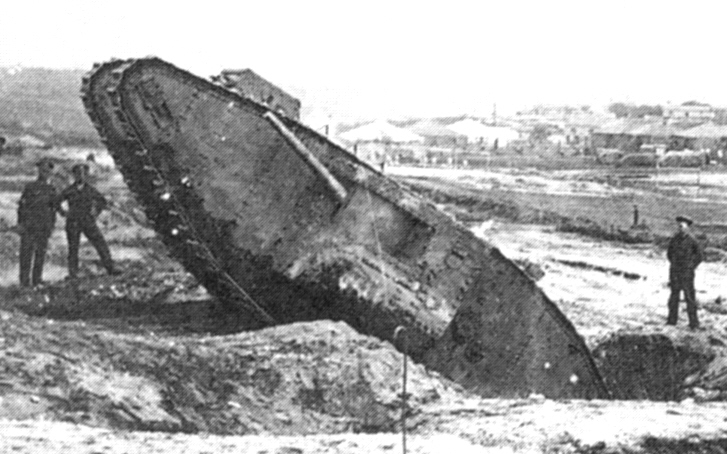
Mark III tank in a ditch, in 1917

The Mark III was a training tank and used Lewis machine guns and a smaller sponson for the females. Fifty were built. It was originally intended that the Mark III was to have all the proposed new design features of the Mark IV. This is why there were two distinct training types, the Mark II being little more than a slightly improved Mark I. However, development of the new features was so slow that the change from the Mark II was very gradual. The last two Mark IIIs were melted down in the Second World War. They did not see action overseas.

=== Mark IV ===
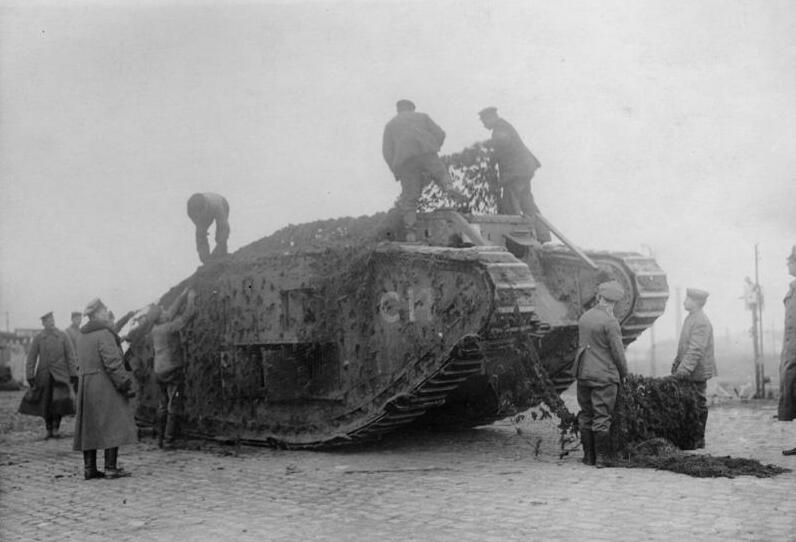
A female Mark IV tank C14. Photographed with German forces after the Battle of Cambrai. December 1917

The Mark IV was a more heavily armoured version of the Mark I, and went into production in May 1917. Fundamental mechanical improvements had originally been intended, but had to be postponed. The main change was the introduction of the QF 6-pounder 6 cwt Hotchkiss, a shorter-barrelled version of the earlier gun. Improved 12 mm armour made it impervious to German armour-piercing rifle bullets. Lewis guns replaced the Hotchkiss and Vickers machine guns in both the male and female variants, although the air-cooling system of the Lewis proved problematic and the Hotchkiss was later readopted. It had all its fuel stored in a single external tank, located between the rear track horns, in an attempt to improve crew safety. The smaller sponsons could be swung inwards on hinges to reduce the width of the tank for rail transportation, where previous models had required partial disassembly to fit within the loading gauge. Rails on the roof carried an unditching beam whose purpose was to help extricate the tank from difficult trenches by attaching it to the tracks. A total of 1,220 were built: 420 males, 595 females and 205 tank tenders, which were supply tanks.

The Mark IVs were used successfully at the Messines Ridge in June 1917, where they outpaced the infantry on dry ground, but in the Third Ypres of July and August they found the swampy ground difficult and were of little use. About 432 Mark IV tanks were used during the Battle of Cambrai in November 1917.

The first tank-to-tank battle was between Mk IV tanks and German A7Vs in the Second Battle of Villers-Bretonneux in April 1918. (Note: Part of the Battle of the Lys.)

=== Mark V series ===
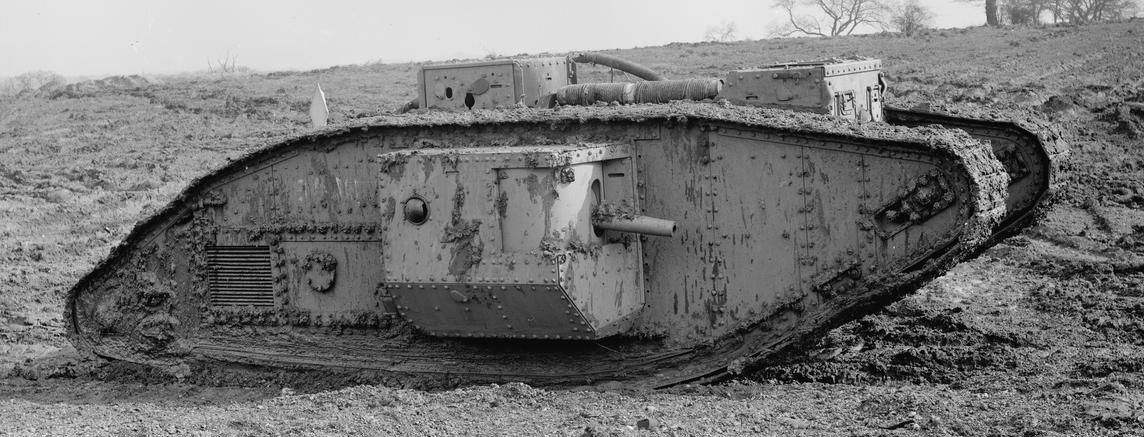
Mark V "male" tank, showing short 6-pounder (57-mm) Hotchkiss gun in right sponson

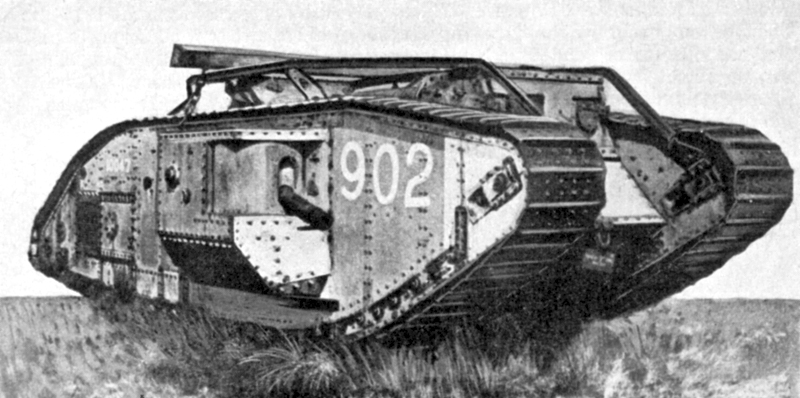
A Mark V* tank – on the roof, the tank carries an unditching beam on rails, that could be attached to the tracks and used to extricate itself from difficult muddy trenches and shell craters

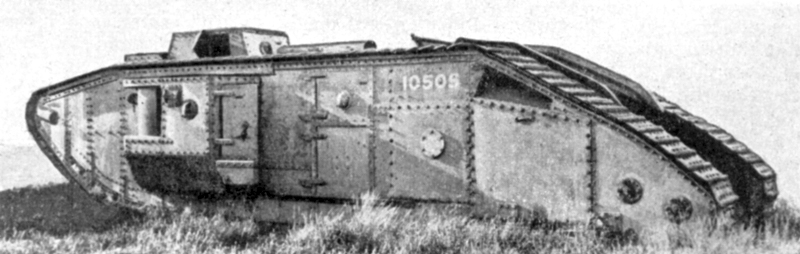
A Mark V** tank

The Mark V was first intended to be a completely new design of tank, of which a wooden mock-up had been finished. However, when the new engine and transmission originally destined for the Mark IV became available in December 1917, the first, more advanced Mark V design was abandoned for fear of disrupting the production run. The designation "Mark V" was switched to an improved version of the Mark IV, not equipped with the new systems. The original design of the Mark IV was to be a large improvement on the Mark III but had been scaled back to be a mild improvement because of technical delays. The Mark V thus turned out very similar to the original design of the Mark IV – i.e. a greatly modified Mark III.

Four hundred were built, two hundred each of Males and Females. Several were converted to Hermaphrodites (also known as "Composites") by fitting one male and one female sponson so that each tank had a 6-pounder. This measure was intended to ensure that female tanks would not be outgunned when faced with captured British male tanks in German use or the Germans' own A7V.

The Mark V was first used in the Battle of Hamel on 4 July 1918, when 60 tanks contributed to a successful assault on the German lines by Australian units. It took part in eight further major engagements during the War. A number saw service in the Allied intervention in the Russian Civil War on the White Russian side. Most were captured and used by the Red Army in the Russian Civil War. Four were retained by Estonian forces, and two by Latvia.

==== Mark V* ====
The Mark V* was a version with a stretched hull, lengthening it by 6 ft (1.8 m). It had a larger cupola on the roof and doors in the side of the hull (previous versions had small hatches under the sponsons of females or small doors in the rear of the sponson for males, along with a small hatch in the rear). The extra section was also designed to house a squad of infantry. The weight was 33 tons. Of orders for 500 Males and 200 Females, 579 had been built by the Armistice – the order was completed by Metropolitan Carriage in March 1919.

==== Mark V** ====
Because the Mark V* had been lengthened, its original length-width ratio had been spoiled. Lateral forces in a turn now became unacceptably high, causing thrown tracks and an enormous turning circle. Therefore, Major Wilson redesigned the track in May 1918, with a stronger curve to the lower run reducing ground contact and the tracks widened to 26.5 in (673 mm). The Mark V engine was bored out to give 225 hp (168 kW) and was sat further back in the hull. The cabin for the driver was combined with the commander's cabin; there now was a separate machine gun position in the back. Of a revised order for 700 tanks (150 Females and 550 Males), only 25 were built and only one of those by the end of 1918.

=== Mark VI ===
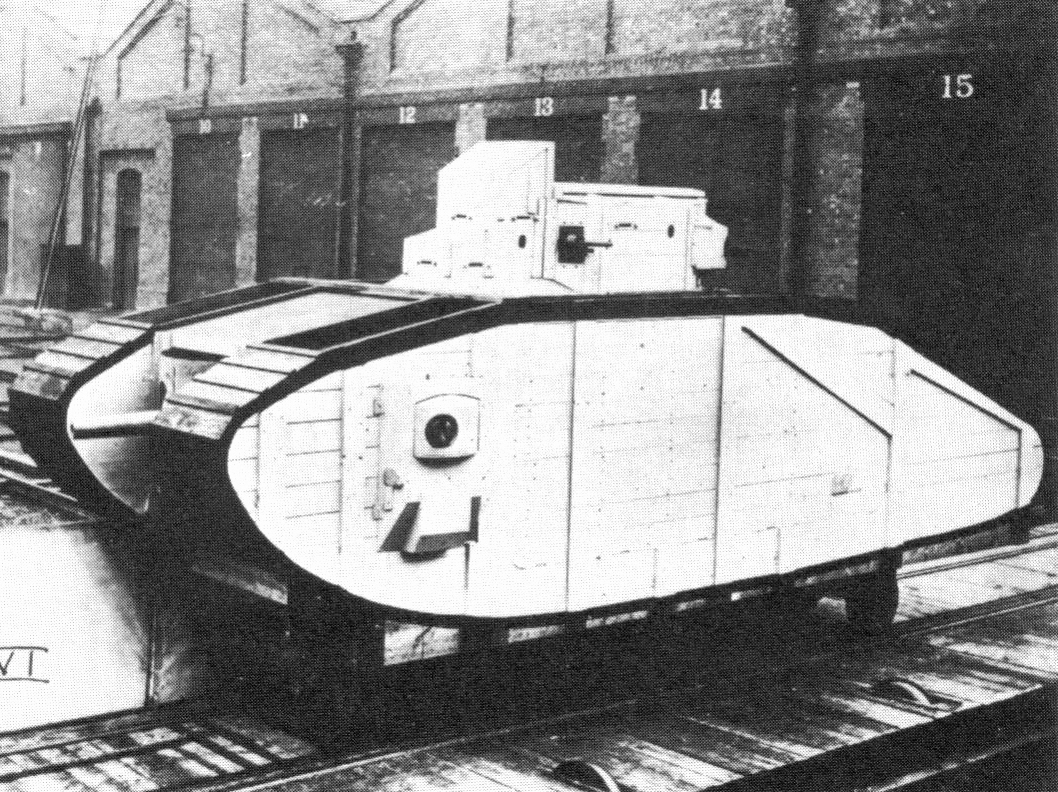
Wooden mockup of the proposed Mark VI, 1917

The Mark VI was one of a pair of related projects to develop the tank initiated in late 1916. The Mark V would be the application of as many advanced features as could be managed on the Mark I hull design and the Mark VI would be a complete break with the Mark I hull. The Mark V would not be built as such, because of the delays with the Mark IV and it would be a different Mark V that was built. The Mark VI project design had a completely new hull – taller and with rounded track paths. The single main gun was in the front of the hull. It did not progress past the stage of a wooden mock-up; the project was cancelled in December 1917 in order that a tank co-developed with the US (the Mark VIII) could go forward.

=== Mark VII ===
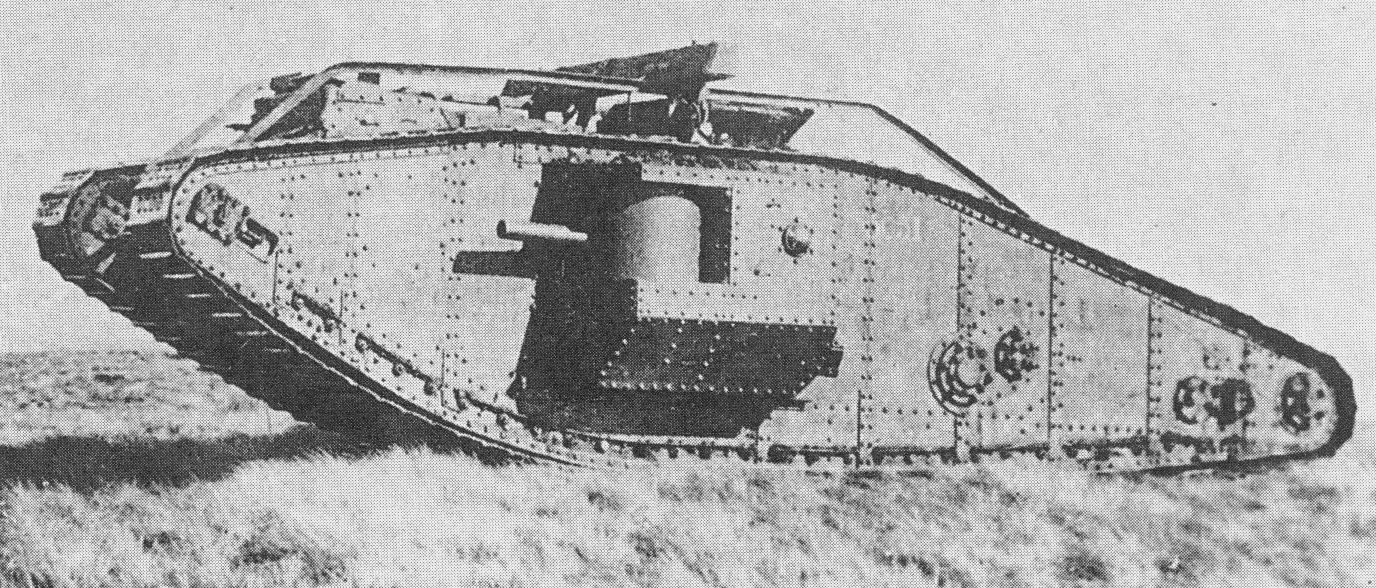
Mark VII tank

Mark Knothe, the Technical Liaison Officer between Stern, Elles and Anley, contributed to the development of the tank, designing a longer Mark I with Williams-Janney hydraulic transmission; one of the Mark IIs used as test vehicles had used a hydraulic transmission. In October 1917 Brown Brothers (Note: A subsidiary of Vickers) in Edinburgh were granted a contract to develop this line of research further. In July 1918, the prototype was ready. Its drive system was very complex. The 150 hp (112 kW) Ricardo engine drove into Variable Speed Gear Ltd. pumps that in turn powered two hydraulic motors, moving one track each by means of several chains. To ward off the obvious danger of overheating, there were many fans, louvres and radiators. However, steering was easy and gradual and the version was taken into production to equip one tank battalion. Three had been built, and only one delivered out of an order for 74 when war ended. It was passed over in favour of the Mark VIII, which was ordered at the same time. The hull was slightly lengthened compared to the Mark V. No Mark VIIs survive.

=== Mark VIII ===
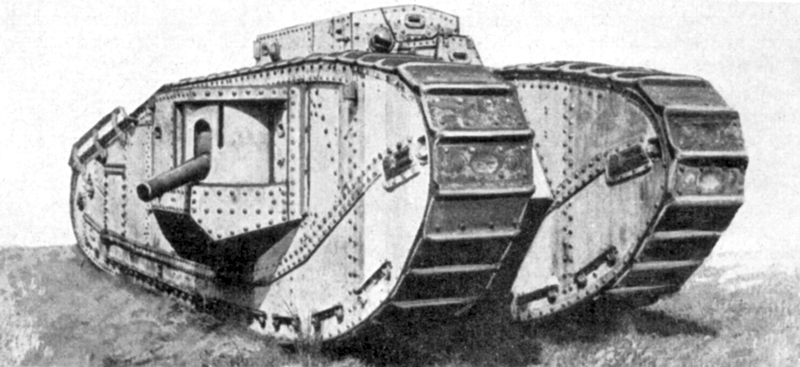
The Allied Mark VIII (Liberty) tank

When Stern was removed from his post following disagreements with the War Office, he was side-lined by appointment to a new department to work on a cooperative design between the Allies – assembly in France, hulls, guns and their ammunition from the UK and other components (principally the engines) from the US. American involvement in the development of the tank design led to the Mark VIII, also known as "Liberty" or Anglo-American tank (though initially the French were partially involved).

The engine, a 330 hp (250 kW) Ricardo petrol for British tanks and a 300 hp (220 kW) Liberty V12 for US ones to drive its 37 long tons (38 t)s) was compartmentalised from the crew of 12 (later reduced to 10), and the cupola structure included forward and rear firing machine guns. Of a planned (shared production) of 1,500 each, a single British prototype was finished by the end of the war. The British built just 24, the Americans completed 100 between September 1918 and 1920, at the Rock Island Arsenal, at a cost of $35,000 [£8,750] apiece ($430,000 [£226,000] in 2006). About 40 hulls for the U.S. Liberty were produced by the Manchester Tank Syndicate, 11 British Type Mark VIII by the North British Locomotive Company.

They were used and upgraded until the 1930s, when they were given to Canada for training; some M1917s were sold to the Canadians at nominal scrap value. The tank itself was 34 ft 2 in (10.41 m) long and 10 ft 3 in (3.12 m) tall. At its widest across the sponsons it was 12 ft 4 in (3.76 m). There had been an even longer 44-foot (13 m) version planned but never made (the Mark VIII*). The tank was outdated by the 1930s due to its slow speed (under 6 mph (9.7 km/h) and thin armour (6–16 mm), but it did have one of the longest independent trench crossing capabilities of any armoured fighting vehicle (AFV) ever made; later tanks used bridge laying tanks for crossing large deep trenches.

=== Mark IX ===
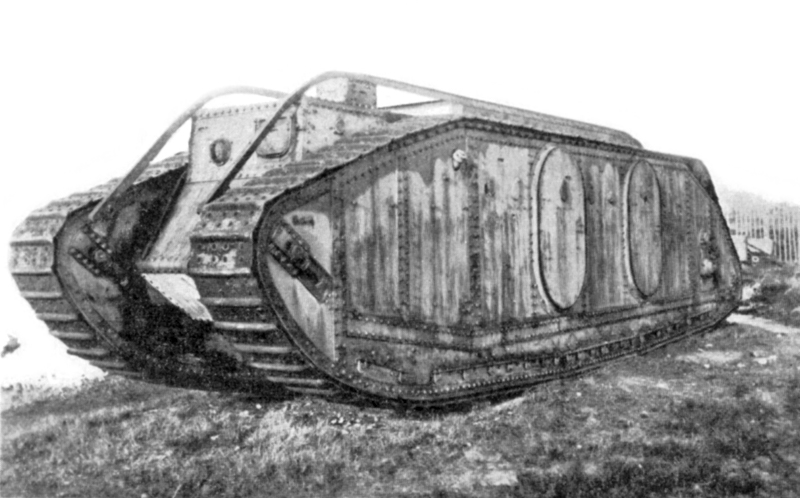
Mark IX tank

The Mark IX was a troop carrier and infantry supply vehicle – among the first tracked armoured personnel carriers not counting experiments with the lengthened Mk Vs. Thirty-four were built out of an order for 200.

=== Mark X ===
The Mark X was a paper-only project to improve the Mark V, originally known as Mark V*** (L). This was basically a contingency plan in case the Mark VIII project failed (if so a production of 2000 was foreseen for 1919), trying to produce a tank with as many parts of the Mark V as possible but with improved manoeuvrability and crew comfort.

== Combat history ==
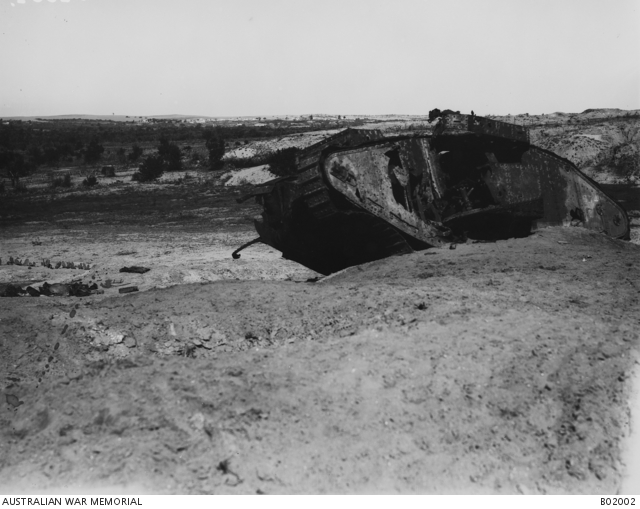
Destroyed British Mark I female tank at the Second Battle of Gaza

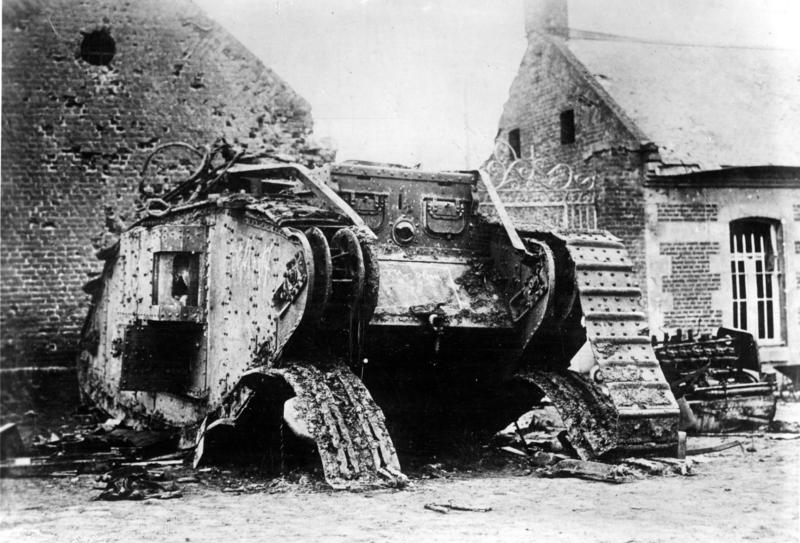
A destroyed Mark IV tank near Cambrai, 1917

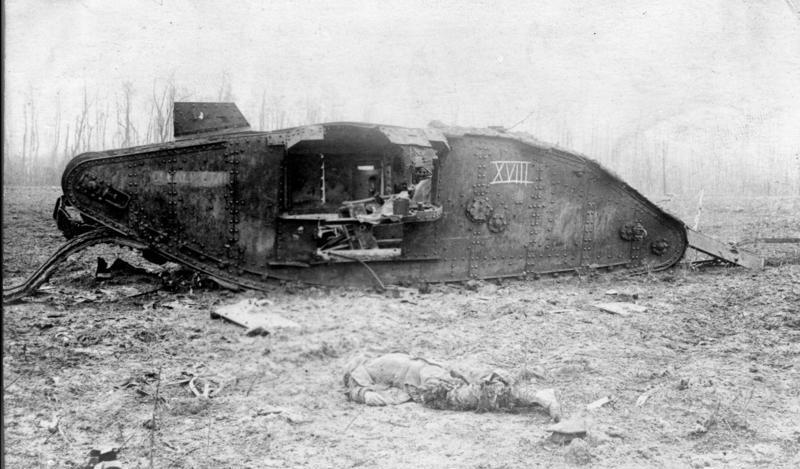
Mark IV female tank destroyed

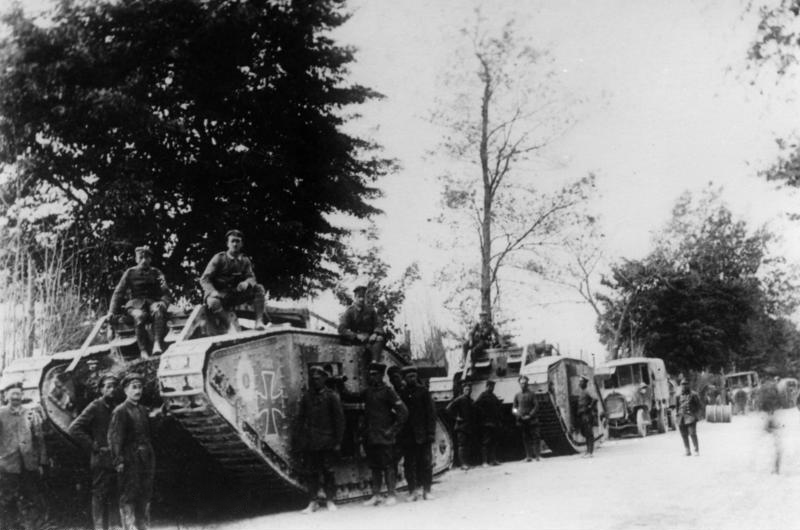
German forces using captured British Mark IVs during the Second Battle of the Marne

The first tanks were added, as a "Heavy Branch", to the Machine Gun Corps until a separate Tank Corps was formed on 28 July 1917 by royal warrant. A small number of Mark I tanks took part in the Battle of the Somme during the Battle of Flers-Courcelette in September 1916. They were used to cut through barbed wire to clear the way for infantry, and were even driven through houses to destroy machine gunner's emplacements. Although many broke down or became stuck, almost a third that attacked made it across no man's land, and their effect on the enemy was noted, leading to a request by the British C-in-C Douglas Haig for a thousand more. This came as a surprise: William Tritton had already started the development of a heavier tank: the Flying Elephant. Unfortunately for the Allies, it also gave the Germans time to develop a specifically designed anti-tank weapon for the infantry, an armour-piercing 7.92 mm K bullet.

Eight Mk I tanks were used against Turkish forces in the Second Battle of Gaza in April 1917 during the Sinai and Palestine Campaign. With its three destroyed tanks replaced by Mk IVs, the tank company fought at the Third Battle of Gaza.

British tanks were used with varying success in the offensives of 1917 on the Western Front; however, their first large scale use in a combined operation was at the Battle of Cambrai in November 1917, when nearly 400 tanks working closely with advancing infantry and a creeping barrage overran the German lines in the initial attack. During the Battle of Amiens in August 1918, several hundred Mark V tanks, along with the new Whippet and Mk V* tanks, penetrated the German lines in a foretaste of modern armoured warfare.

=== German service ===
The German army recovered about 50 abandoned British Mark IV tanks from the Cambrai battlefield and were able to restore some 30 of them to running order. One was taken to Berlin and was demonstrated to the Kaiser, while the others went to a captured engineering plant near Charleroi for refurbishment. The machine guns were retained but rechambered to fire German ammunition, while the 6-pounders were replaced by captured Belgian 57 mm Nordenfelt guns. The captured tanks were painted with prominent Iron Cross emblems and a bold disruptive camouflage pattern, although some appear to have retained the original khaki colour scheme. Although some of these tanks were used in the German Spring Offensive, they tended to be deployed in small numbers for mopping-up operations, while officers reported that they were unable to keep up with the fast-moving infantry. In the aftermath of the offensive, some 300 abandoned British tanks were behind German lines, of which 170 were reported to be repairable. By the end of the war, there were seven German tank battalions equipped with captured British tanks.

=== Russian service ===
In 1919, a number of British tanks were involved in the Allied intervention in the Russian Civil War; 74 Mark V and Whippets formed the South Russian Tank Detachment which was landed on the Black Sea coast, while a much smaller North Russian Tank Detachment was sent to guard the port of Arkhangelsk. Attempts were made to train White Army troops in their use and they were left in their hands when the Allies withdrew. 59 of them were captured by the Red Army and were used in 1921 during the Red Army invasion of Georgia and contributed to the Soviet victory in the battle for Tbilisi. The last Soviet Mark V tanks were finally retired in 1938. Two ex-Estonian Mark V tanks were used in the defence of Tallinn in August 1941.

In 1945, occupying troops came across two badly damaged Mk V tanks in Berlin. Photographic evidence indicates that these were survivors of the Russian Civil War and had previously been displayed as a monument in Smolensk, Russia, before being brought to Berlin after the German invasion of the Soviet Union in 1941.Accounts of their active involvement in the Battle of Berlin have not been verified.

== Cultural impact ==
A Mark IV "Tank Bank" nicknamed "Julian" gives a fund-raising display in Blackpool in 1918.

Although the first limited use of tanks in 1916 had been militarily disappointing, the first British press reports hailed them as wonder weapons, and used elaborate language to compare them to dragons, whales, dreadnoughts, crabs, mammoths or "armoured toads". Public fascination was deepened by the release of several documentary films about tanks, it has been estimated that these were seen by 20 million people in the United Kingdom.

Tanks were celebrated in music hall songs such as The Tanks that Broke the Ranks and manufacturers were soon producing toy tanks, tank teapots, tank-shaped handbags and tank fairground rides. Following the appearance in London of several tanks at the Lord Mayor's Show in November 1917, one was dispatched to Trafalgar Square, where an immense crowd was encouraged to buy National War Bonds to help finance the war. Following that success, starting with a "Tank Week" held in March 1918, tanks, known as "Tank Banks", and other military vehicles were displayed at bond-selling events across the country. Citizens were encouraged to save small change towards buying more bonds in miniature "tank banks", small ceramic piggy banks in the shape of a tank. A competition ensued to see which British city or town could raise the most in relation to their population.

== Surviving vehicles ==
A number of tanks have survived, although several are just shells that have had all internal components removed. The largest collection is at The Tank Museum at Bovington in the United Kingdom, which holds eight tanks. Two of these are maintained in running condition, the Mark IV Male, Excellent and Mark V Male number 9199. Excellent last ran in the 1980s and 9199 in the 2000s. The Bovington museum does not intend to run them again, due to the wear and tear that would be inflicted on the now-fragile, historic vehicles. Instead, the museum acquired a replica Mark IV tank (constructed for the film War Horse), which is used for public demonstrations.

=== Little Willie ===
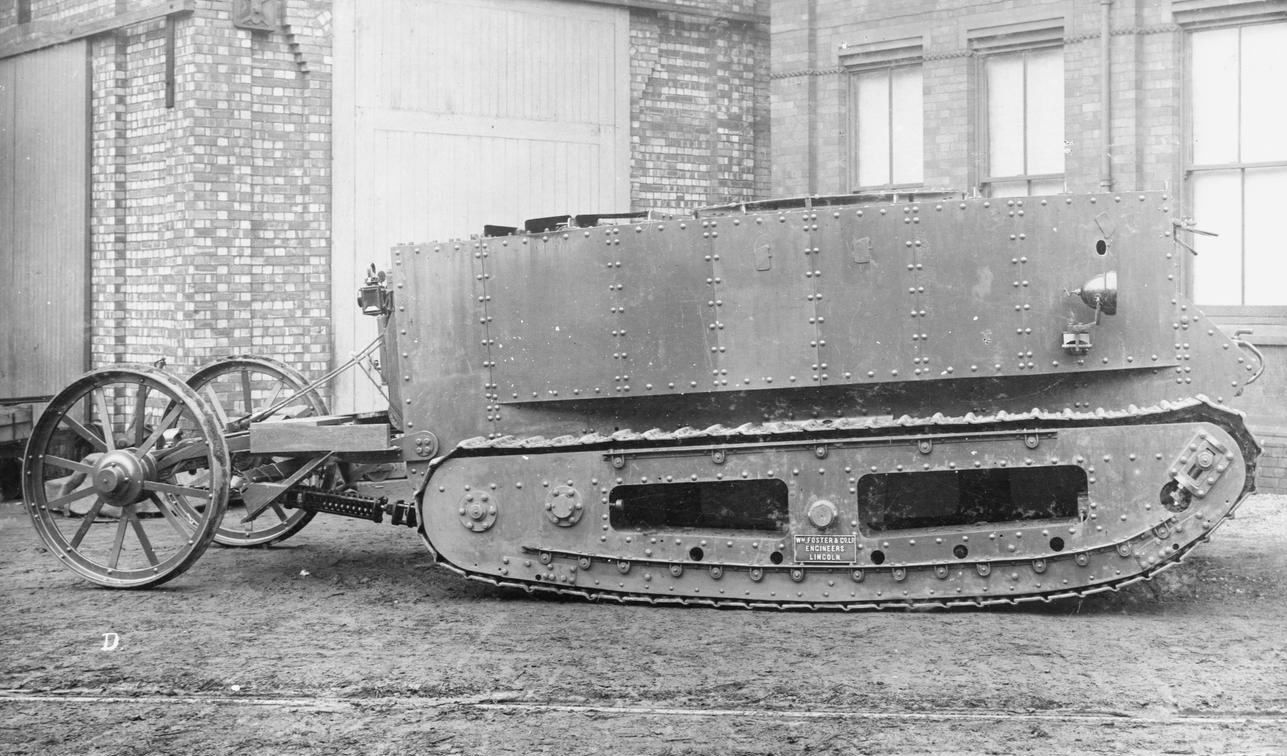
Little Willie showing its rear steering wheels, September 1915

Little Willie survives at the Bovington Tank Museum. It was saved from being scrapped in 1940 on the pretext that it was helping to defend Bovington base against possible German attacks. Many other prototypes, possibly including Mother, were scrapped during the invasion scare.

=== Mark I ===
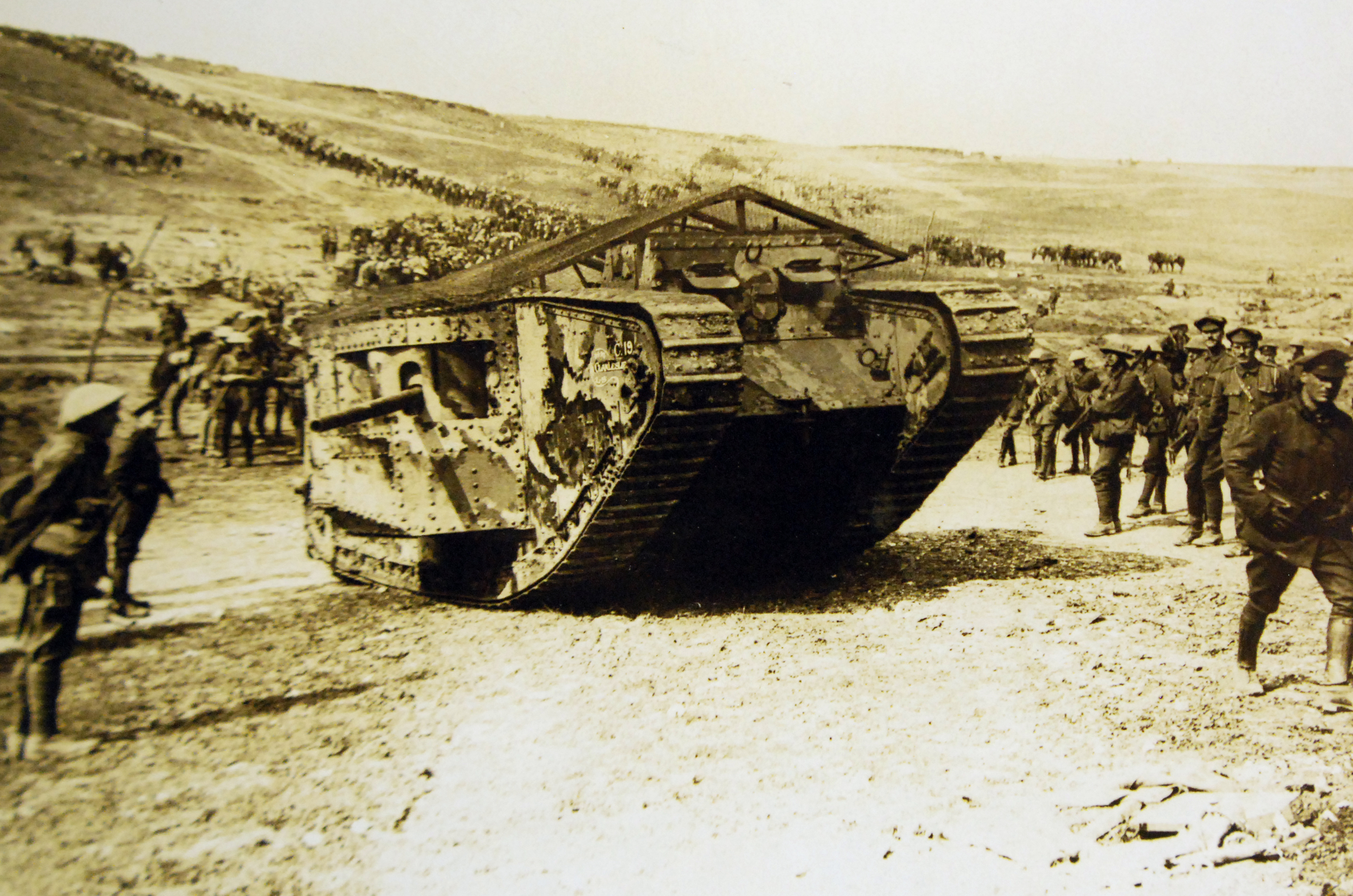
The original Mark I Tank C19, Clan Leslie

A single male survives. This is the only surviving Mark I and the world's oldest surviving combat tank. It is part of the collection at the Bovington Tank Museum. It is painted to represent Number 705, C19, Clan Leslie although its identity and wartime history are unknown. There are indications that it may have served as a driver-training tank and it has been suggested it is Number 702, which would make it the second Mark I built. Between 1919 and 1970, it was sited in the grounds of Hatfield House to commemorate the fact this was a testing site for tanks during their earliest development.

A replica Mark I is on display at the Royal Tank Museum in Amman, Jordan, to commemorate the British tank crewmen who aided the Hashemite armies during the Arab Revolt.

=== Mark II ===
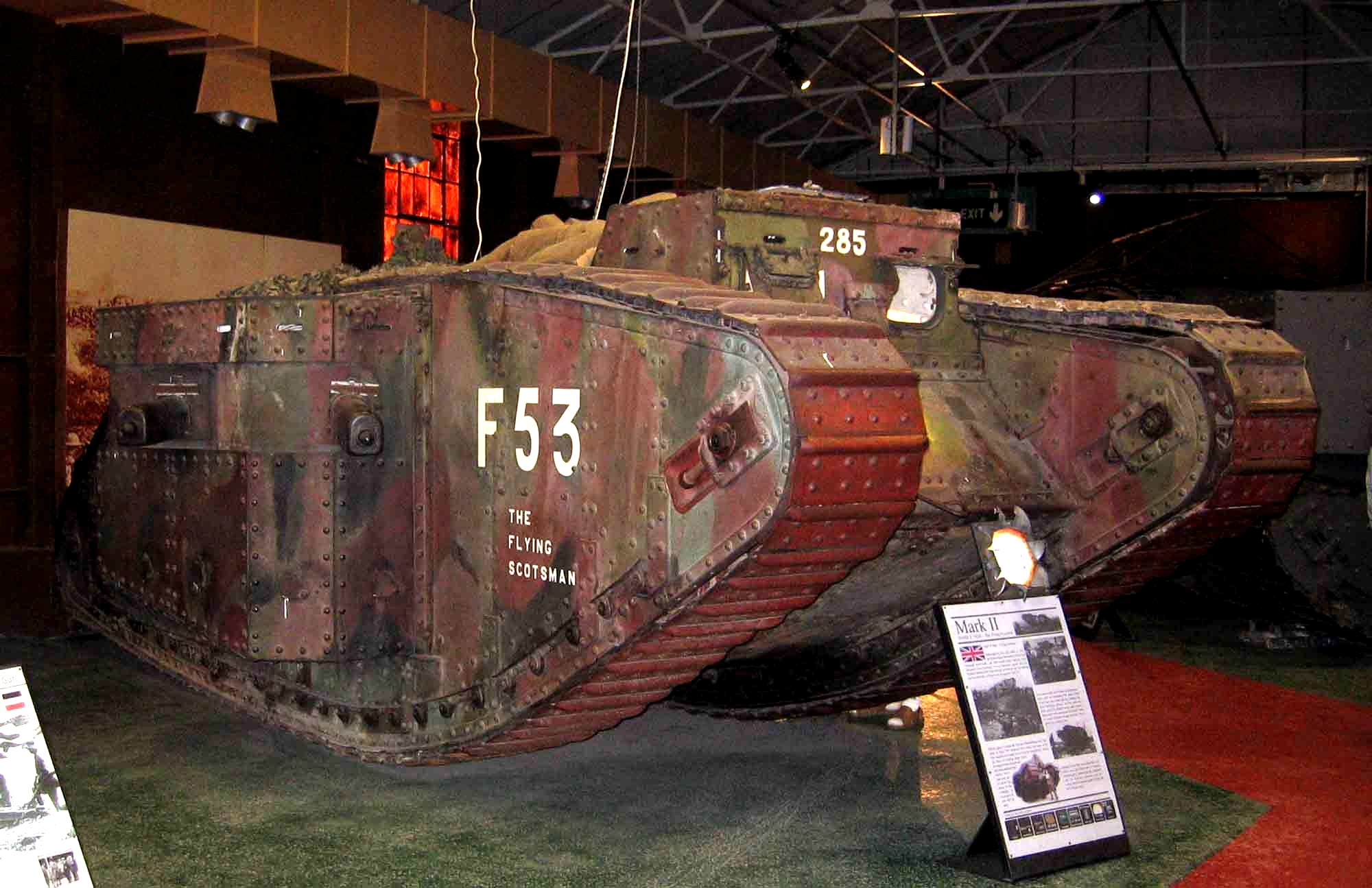
The Bovington Mark II tank, F53 The Flying Scotsman

There is a single more or less complete surviving Mark II, F53: The Flying Scotsman, at the Bovington Tank Museum (see below). This tank still has battle damage sustained at the Battle of Arras in April 1917. This vehicle was originally a Male, had been rebuilt as a supply vehicle, was restored and for a time displayed as a Mark I with a Female barbette on the right side, and was later shown as a Mark II.

Surviving parts from Mark II no. 799 (D26), including tracks and gunshields, can be seen at the Musée Jean et Denise Letaille, Bullecourt.

=== Mark IV ===
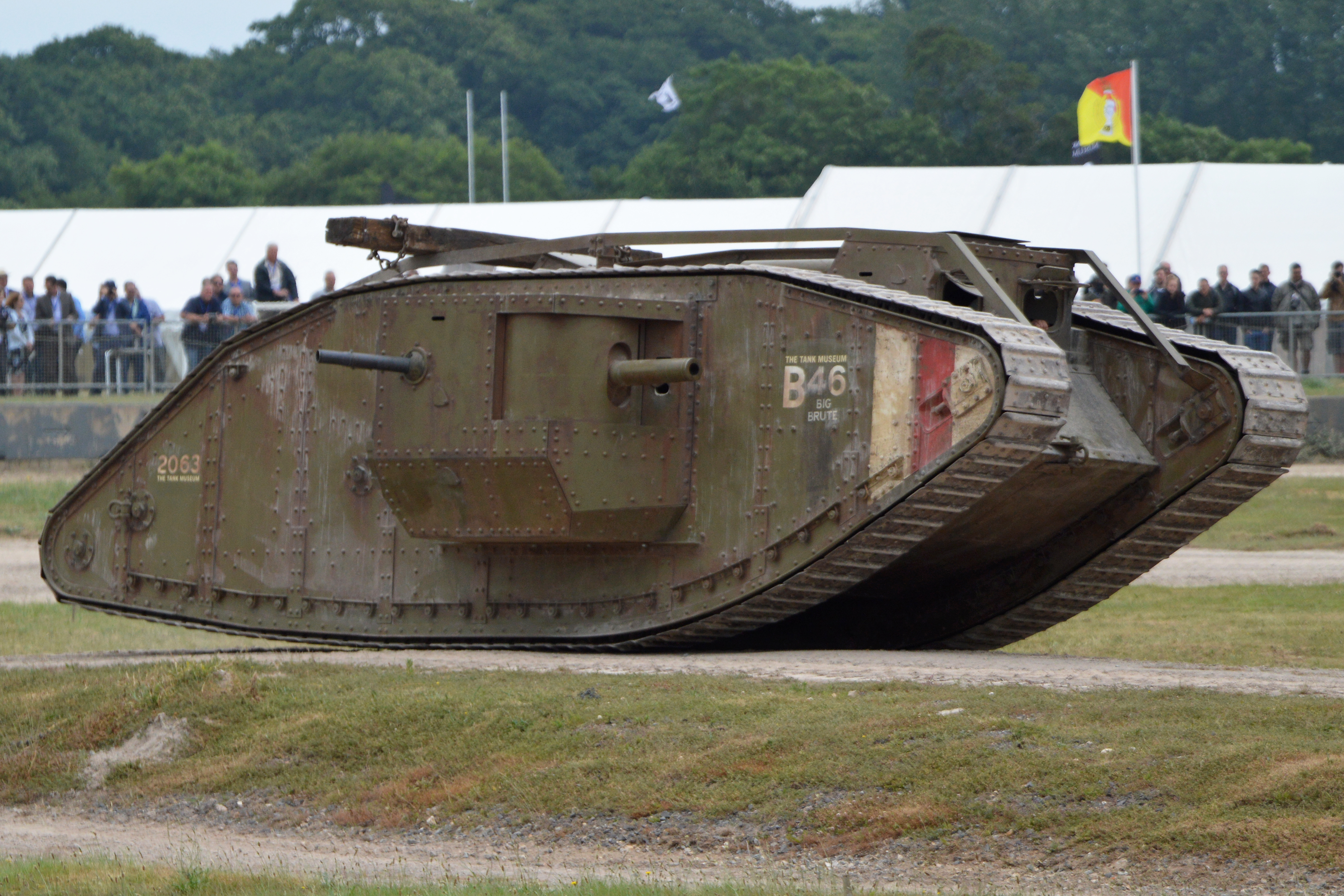
The Big Brute running under its own power at the Tank Museum

Seven Mark IVs survive.

- A Mark IV Female is at the Museum of Lincolnshire Life, Lincoln, England, on permanent loan from the Bovington Tank Museum. A local company, William Foster & Co., manufactured the first tanks. The tank is an empty shell that, at some point in its history, was stripped of its internal components. It is painted as F4: Flirt II, which fought at the Battle of Cambrai and was subsequently captured by the Germans. While there is some evidence the Lincolnshire tank may indeed be Flirt II, its history prior to the Second World War is uncertain.
- A Mark IV Female is preserved at Ashford in Kent. This is one of many that were presented for display to towns and cities in Britain after the war; most were scrapped in the 1920s and 1930s.
- The Royal Military Museum in Brussels has a Male Mark IV tank, the Lodestar III, still in original colours.
- A Mark IV Female, Grit, is stored at the Australian War Memorial. It was on display in ANZAC Hall at the Australian War Memorial until August 2008. It is now kept at their bulk store in Mitchell, Canberra.
- In 1999, a Mark IV Female, D51: Deborah, was excavated at the village of Flesquières in France. It had been knocked out by shell-fire at the Battle of Cambrai (1917) and subsequently buried when used to fill a crater. It is now exhibited at a museum in Flesquières.
- A Mark IV Male, Excellent, is displayed at Bovington. After World War I, this tank was presented by the army to HMS Excellent, a Royal Navy shore establishment where some tank crewmen were trained. During World War II, it was made operational again for service with the Home Guard when German invasion threatened in 1940. It is still maintained in working order.
- Mark IV Female Liberty: formerly displayed at United States Army Ordnance Museum, Aberdeen, Maryland. Originally named Britannia, Renamed Liberty, the tank joined the Ordnance Museum collection in 1919. After decades of exposure to the elements, it is in poor condition, but about to undergo restoration.

==== Replicas ====
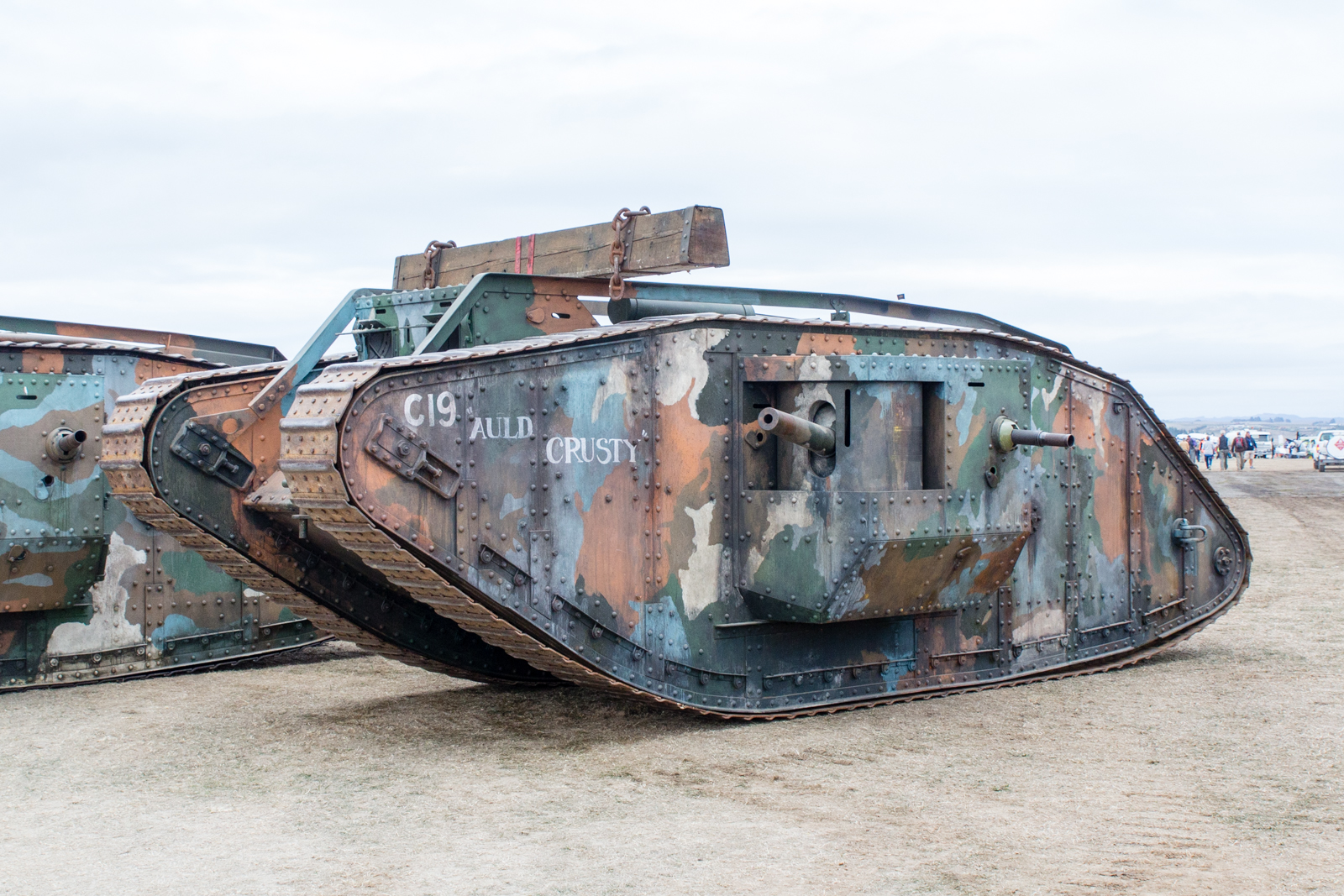
Peter Jackson's tank, Auld Crusty

Two fully functional replica Mark IV tanks were built in England in the early 21st century for demonstration purposes. For a documentary Guy Martin's WWI Tank a female Mark IV replica 'Deborah II' was built at the Norfolk Tank Museum in 2017 to mark the anniversary of the Battle of Cambrai. The Tank Museum at Bovington has a replica male tank named the 'Big Brute', originally built for the film War Horse.

A third replica Mk. IV tank, powered by a JCB hydraulic engine, was constructed in 2017 at Poelkapelle, Belgium. It has both Male and Female sponsons that can be swapped around and is currently painted to represent D29 'Damon II'. The original 'Damon' was immobilised in a shell hole at the Battle of Ypres and served as the village war memorial until it was scrapped by the Nazis in 1941.

Another functional Mk. IV replica was built in 2016 by film director Peter Jackson. It is preserved in New Zealand under the name C19 Auld Crusty. The original H. M. Landship Crusty was built in 1917 and saw action at the Battle of Cambrai. Jackson also owns a fifth replica MK. IV tank called Spring Chicken. In 2020, Jackson built another replica Mk.IV called Perfect Lady.

=== Mark V ===
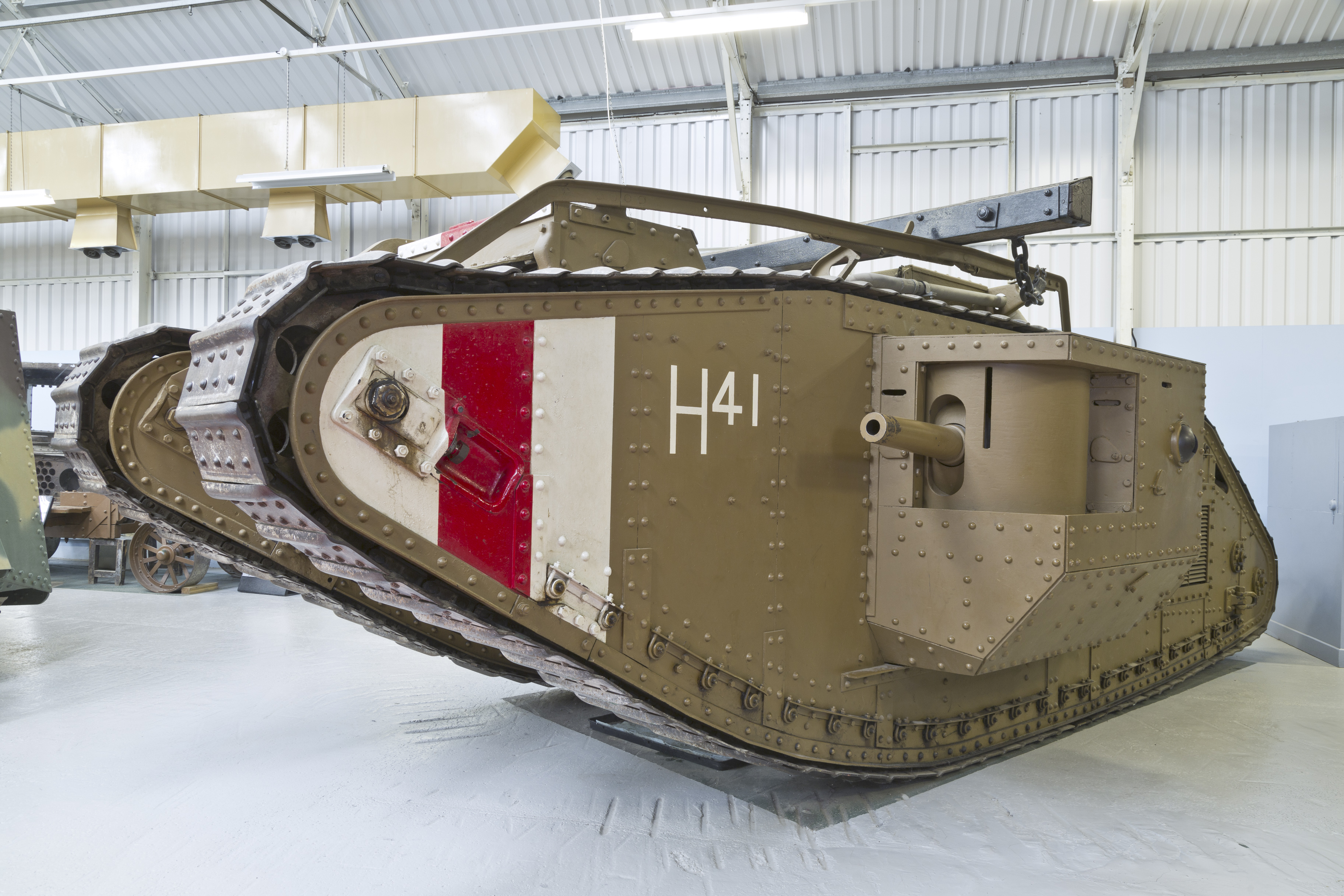
Mark V 9199 at The Tank Museum at Bovington (2015). This tank is maintained in working order but is no longer run, in order to help preserve it.

Eleven Mark Vs survive. The majority are in Russia or Ukraine and are survivors of the tanks sent there to aid the White forces during the Russian Civil War.

- The Tank Museum, Bovington displays a Mark V Male, Number 9199, one of two British World War I tanks still in working order. It was in action at the Battle of Amiens where its commander – Lt. H. A. Whittenbury – was awarded the Military Cross. This tank is maintained in running condition, but is no longer run because of the wear and tear that would be inflicted on a fragile historic vehicle.
- A Mark V** Female: Ol' Faithful, is also preserved at Bovington.
- A heavily restored Mark V Male, Devil, survives at the London Imperial War Museum.
- A Mark V* Male, Number 9591, has since 2010 been part of the collection of the US Army Armor and Cavalry Collection, Fort Benning, Georgia. It was issued to Company A, US 301st Heavy Tank Battalion, and knocked out by a single artillery round on 27 September 1918, during the attack against the Hindenburg Line. It was repaired and sent back to the United States, and is the only surviving example of the Mark V*.
- A Mark V is at the Kubinka Tank Museum, Russia.
- A Mark V serves as memorial in Arkhangelsk. This was originally used by British forces during the Allied Intervention in the Russian Civil War.
- Two preserved Mark Vs, a Male and a Female, form part of an outdoor memorial at Luhansk in Ukraine; two more are in storage.
- A Mark V Female is at the M. F. Sumtsov Kharkiv Historical Museum, Ukraine.

=== Mark VIII/Liberty ===
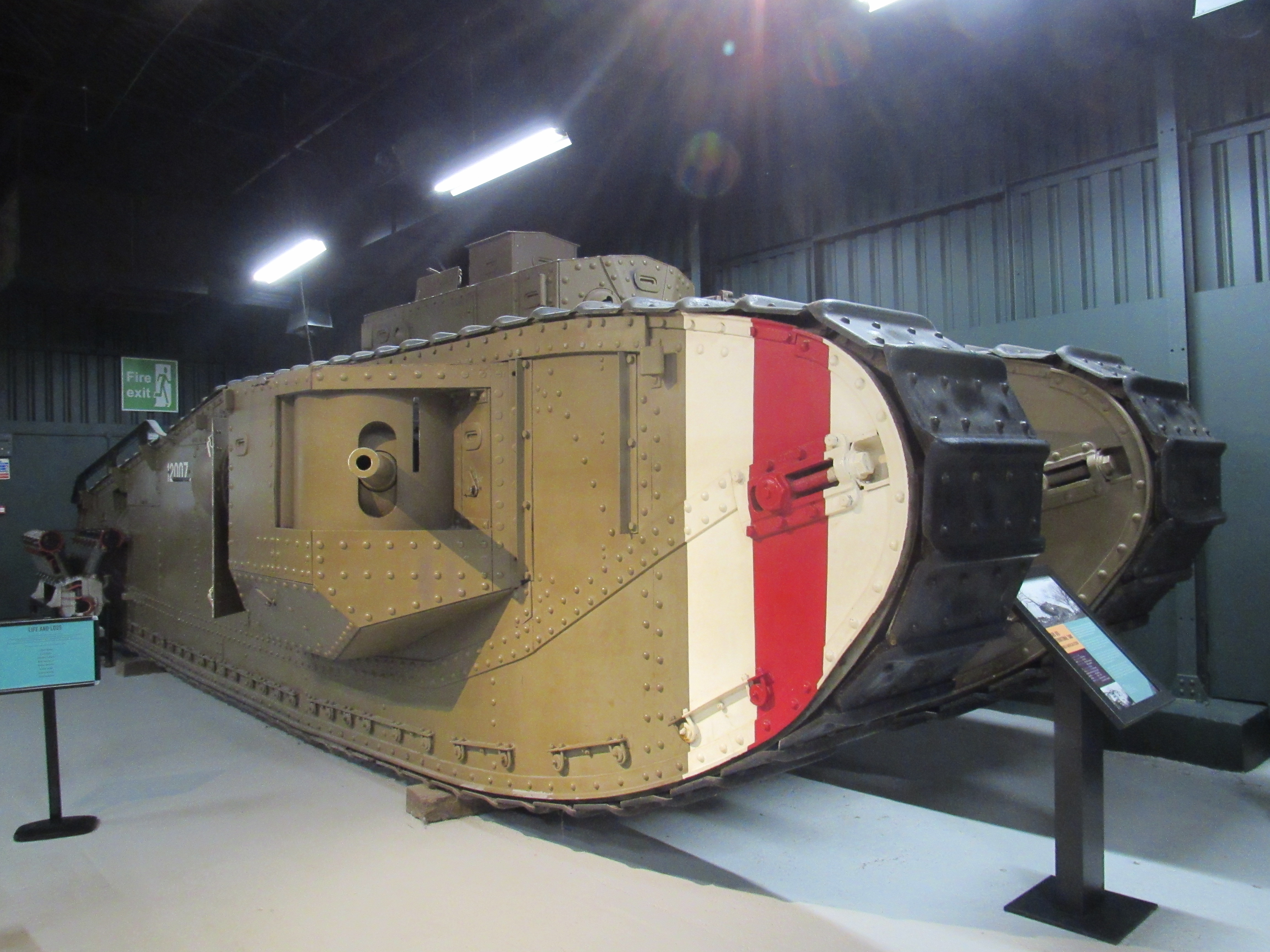
British Mark VIII at Bovington

- A Mark VIII Liberty tank originally at the Aberdeen Proving Ground, Maryland, in 2010 was transferred to the National Armor and Cavalry Museum at Fort Benning, GA. The vehicle was originally assigned to the American 67th Infantry Regiment (Heavy Tanks) at Fort Benning.
- A Liberty tank is preserved at Fort Benning, Georgia. The tank displayed in the museum there was made in 1920 at Rock Island Arsenal, Illinois. It was assigned to the 301st Tank Battalion (Heavy), later redesignated the 17th Tank Battalion (Heavy). Throughout most of 1921–1922, Major Dwight D. Eisenhower commanded this unit.
- A British Mark VIII is at the Tank Museum at Bovington in the UK.
- A Liberty tank is preserved at Rock Island Arsenal, Illinois.

=== Mark IX ===
A single restored Mark IX is at the Tank Museum at Bovington in the UK.

== Gallery ==
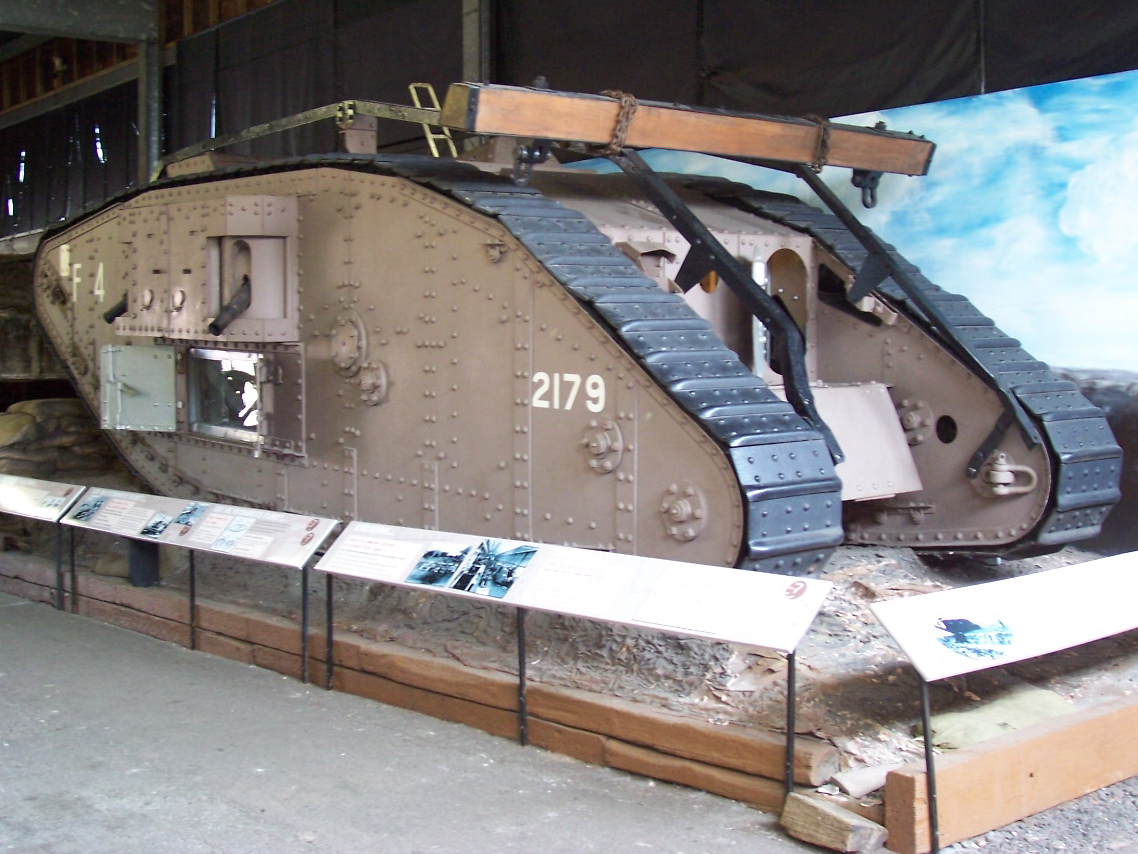
Mark IV tank at the Museum of Lincolnshire Life

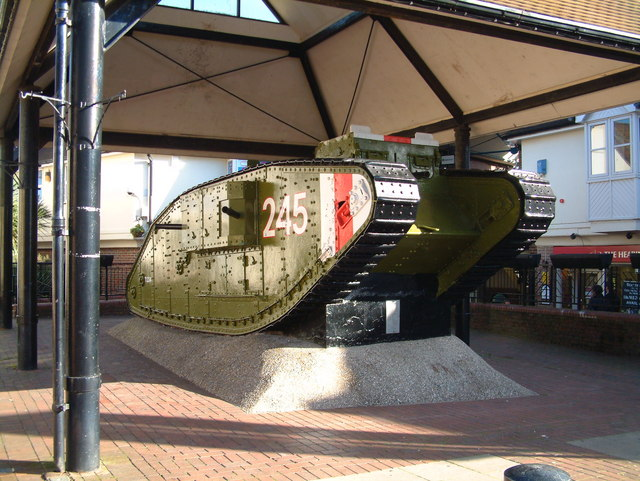
Mark IV Female tank preserved at Ashford, Kent

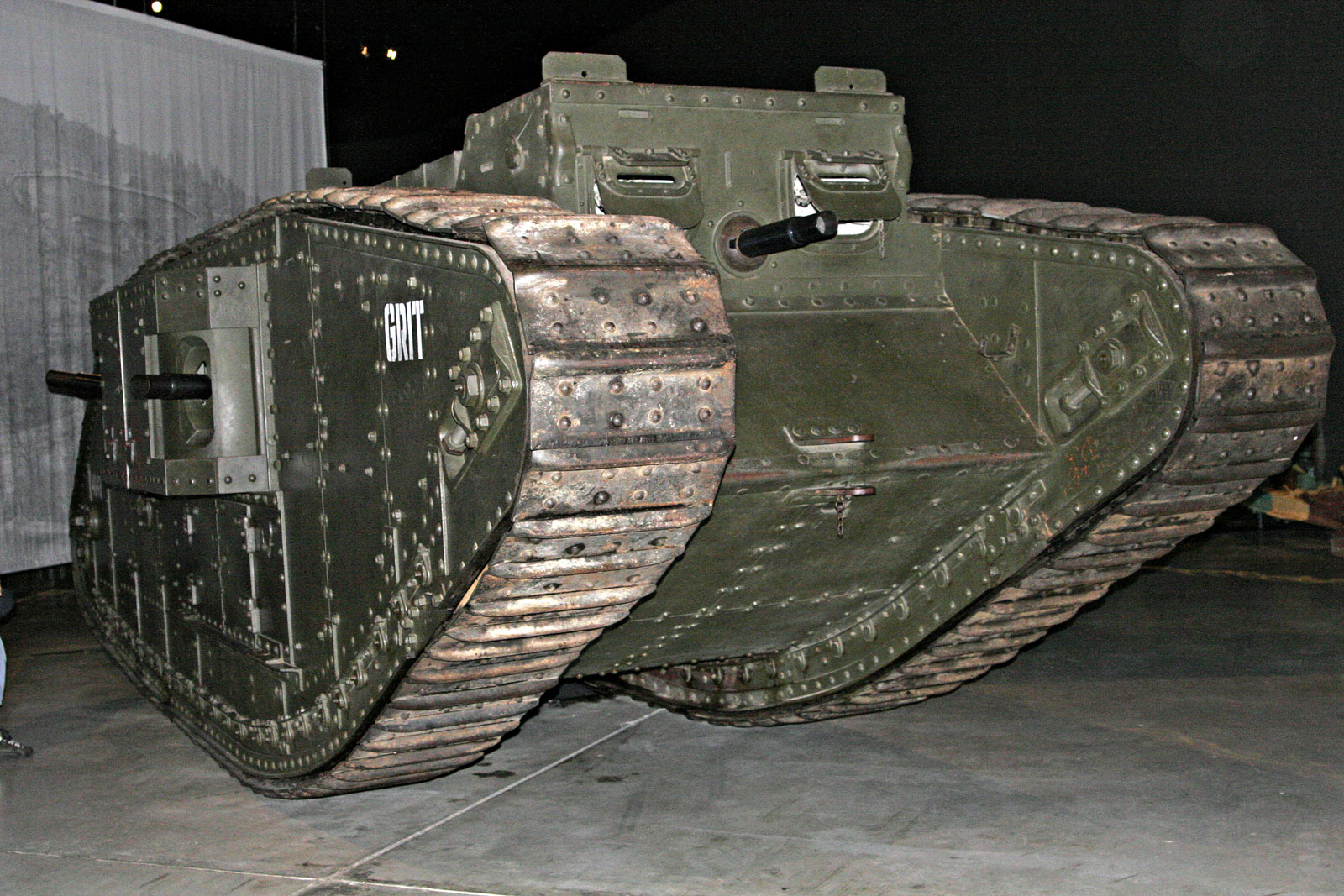
Mark IV tank at the Australian War Memorial

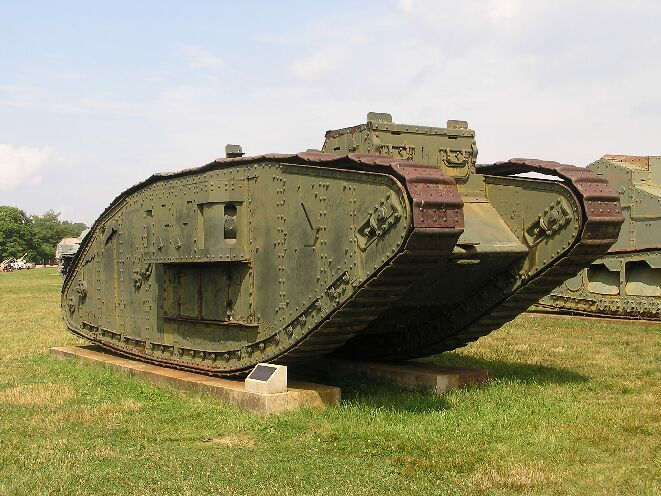
Mark IV Female tank Liberty at the Aberdeen Proving Ground

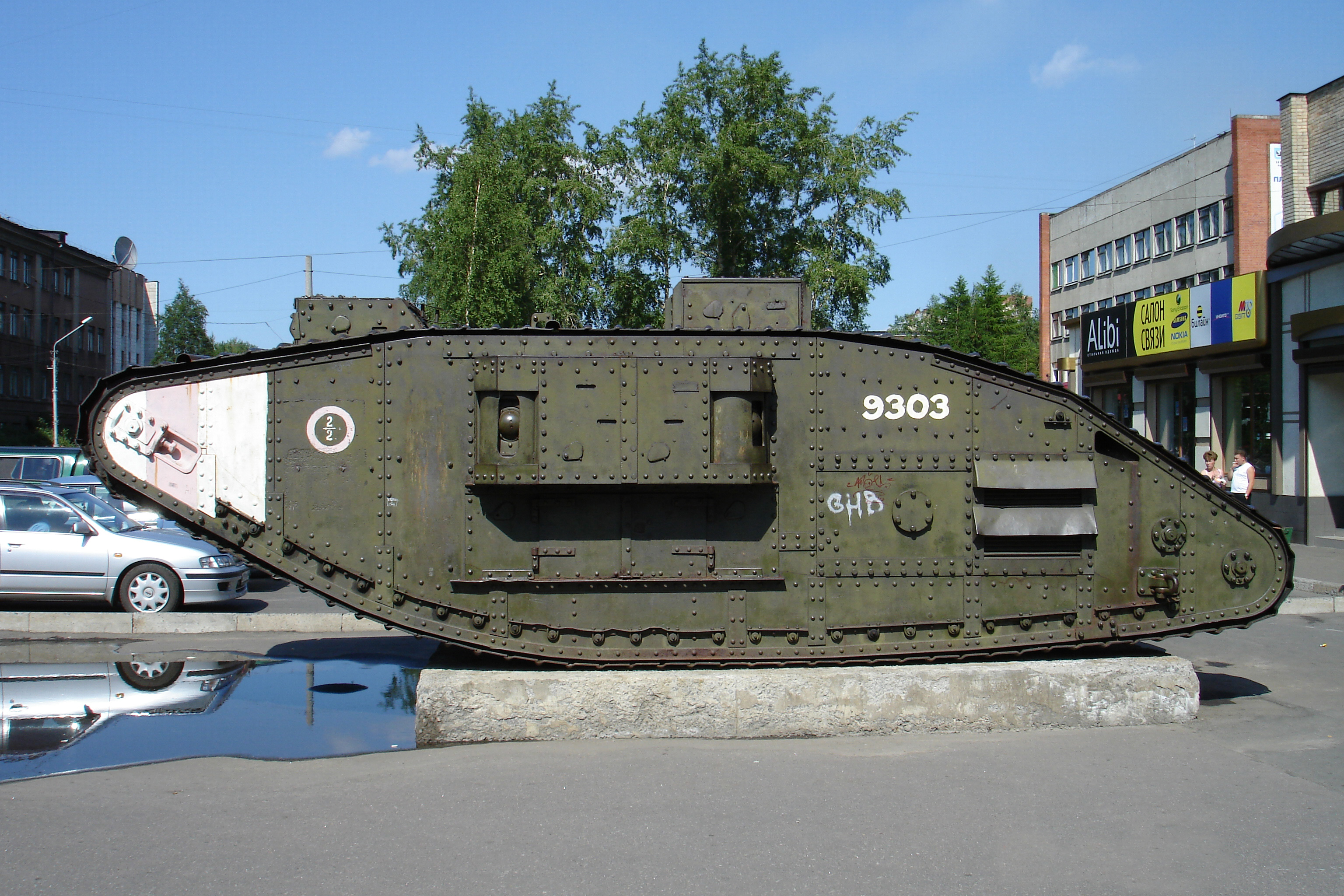
Mark V tank in Arkhangelsk

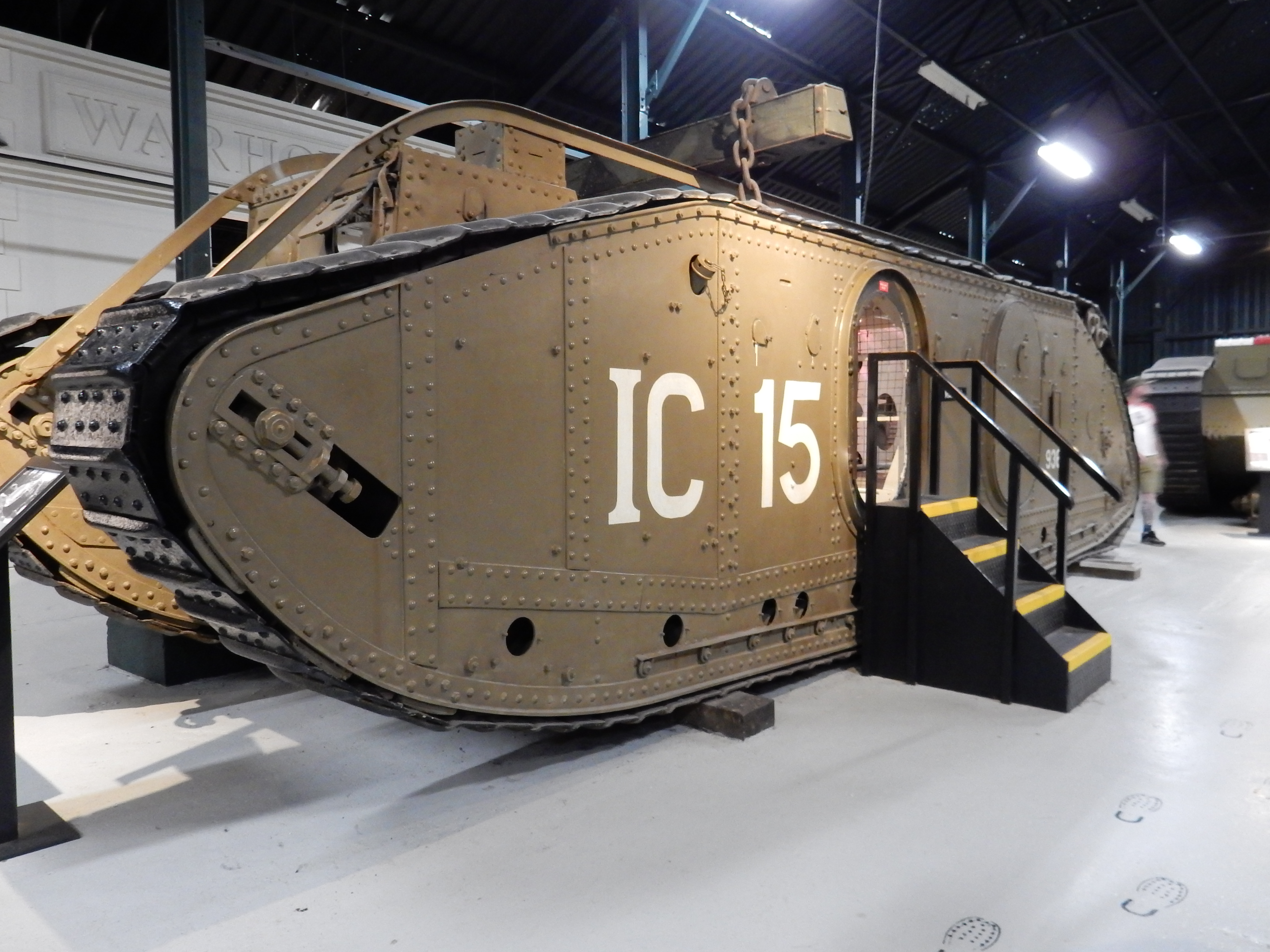
Mark IX armoured personnel carrier

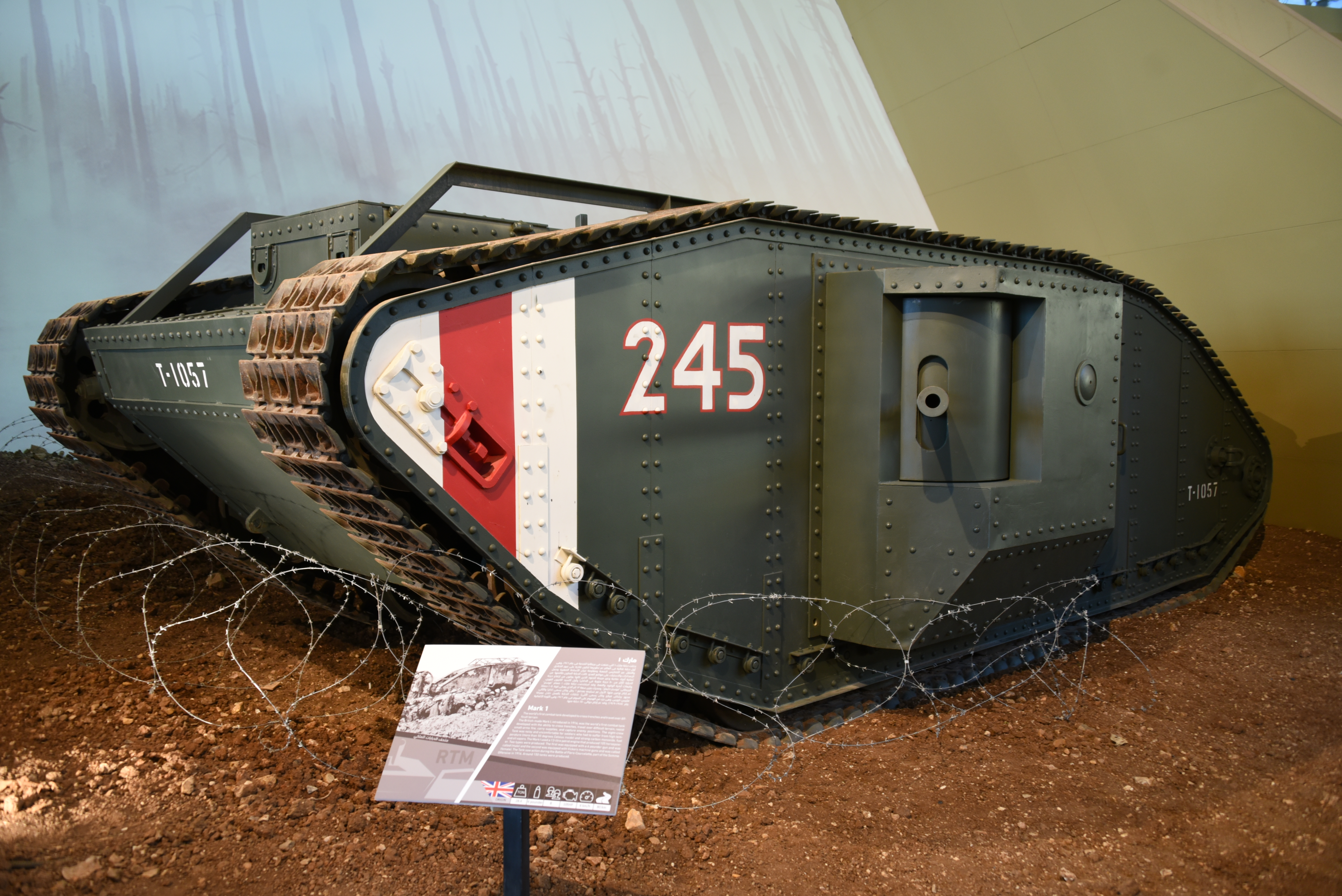
Replica WWI tank, resembling a Mark IV, in Jordan Royal Tank Museum

== See also ==
- Mark V Composite
