= Wings for Victory Week =

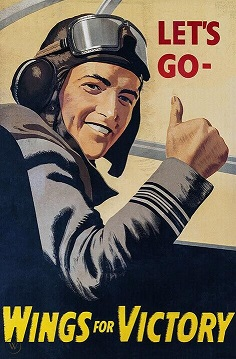
Wings for Victory Poster

Wings for Victory Weeks were British National savings campaigns during the Second World War, with the aim of Royal Air Force aircraft being sponsored by a civil community. The British Army equivalent was Salute the Soldier Week and the Royal Navy equivalent was Warship Week.

== Campaign ==
Each county was set a target of money to raise and local civic leaders were presented with plaques as a reward for the fund raising efforts.

A large military event was held at Trafalgar Square in London in March 1943 to raise money for the Wings for Victory campaign. The amount realised in the weeks specifically designated Wings for Victory Weeks was £615,946,000, equivalent to about £33.6 billion in 2023.
