= Warship Week =

British civilian campaign during World War II

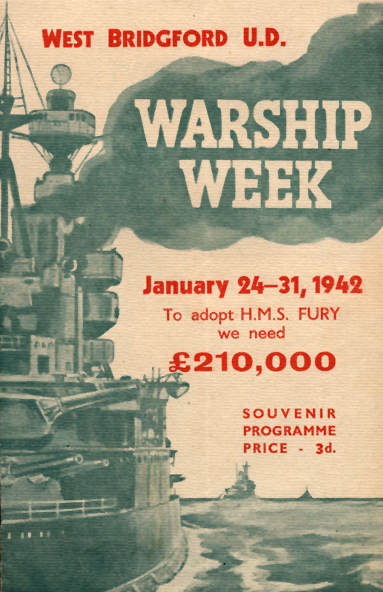
West Bridgford's Warship Week, aiming to adopt HMS Fury

Warship Weeks were British National savings campaigns during the Second World War, with the aim of a Royal Navy warship being adopted by a civil community. During the early parts of the war, the Royal Navy not only had lost many capital ships but was facing increasing pressure to provide escorts for convoys in the Atlantic. While there was not a shortage of sailors, ships sunk by enemy action had to be replaced.

The equivalent for the British Army was Salute the Soldier Week and the equivalent for the Royal Air Force was Wings for Victory Week.

== Campaign ==
=== Local fund-raising ===
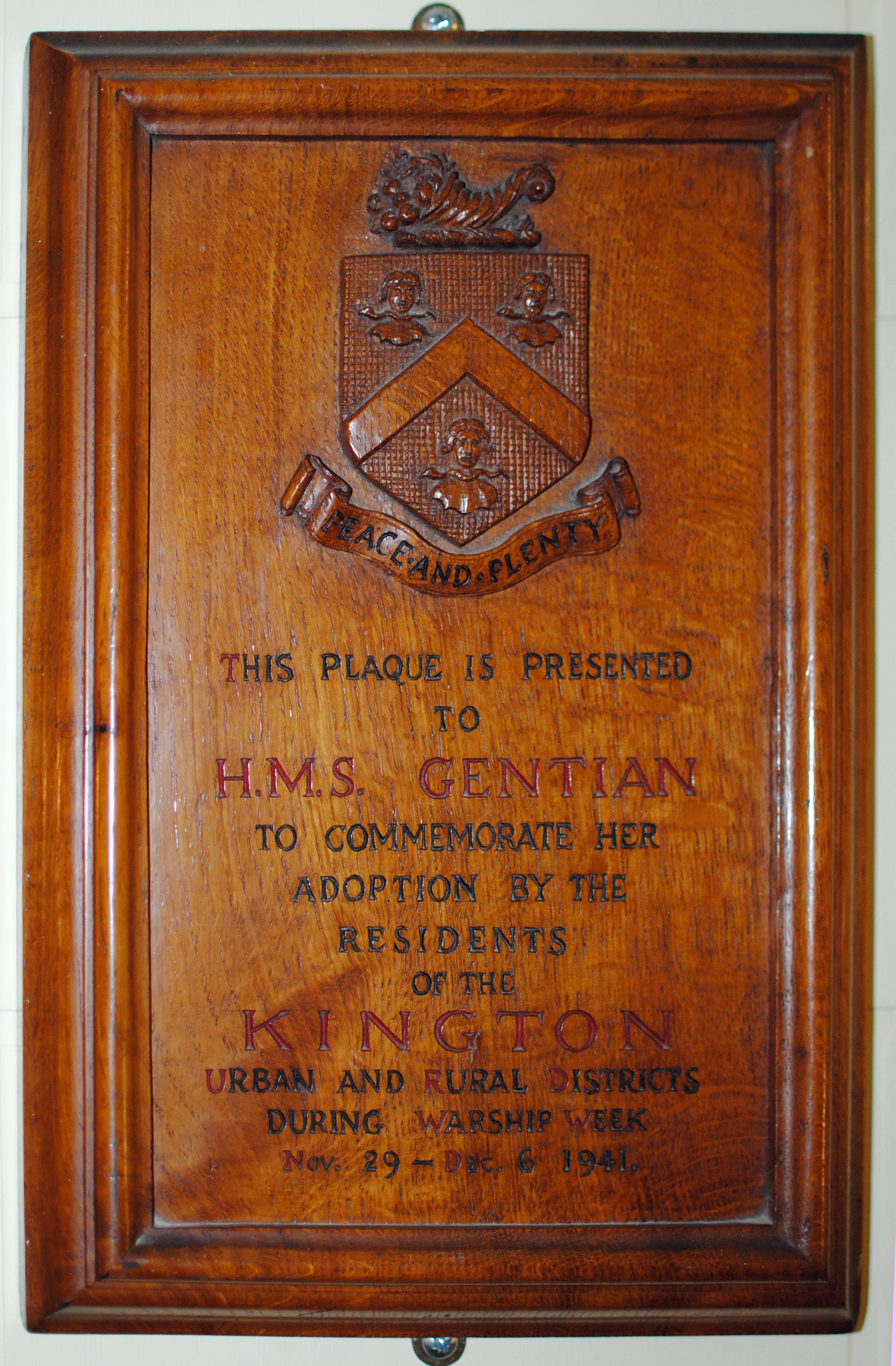
Plaque presented to HMS Gentian, to mark the ship's adoption by the residents of the Kington Urban and Rural Districts during Warship Week, 29 November – 6 December 1941. Now in Kington Museum.

A level of savings would be set to raise enough money to provide the cost of building a particular naval ship. The aim was for cities to raise enough to adopt battleships and aircraft carriers, while towns and villages would focus on cruisers and destroyers. Smaller towns and villages would be set a lower figure. Once the target money was saved for the ship, the community would adopt the ship and its crew.

Local charity organisations, churches and schools would provide the crews of the adopted ship with gloves, woollen socks and balaclavas. Children would often write letters and send cards to the crew. When possible officers and men from the adopted ship would visit the local community. To celebrate their visit a parade would often be organised in their honour.

The ship's commanding officer would exchange plaques, objects and photographs with the city or town that reached the target set, and an adoption would begin. The number of warships adopted was over 1,200, number including battleships, cruisers, destroyers and trawlers.

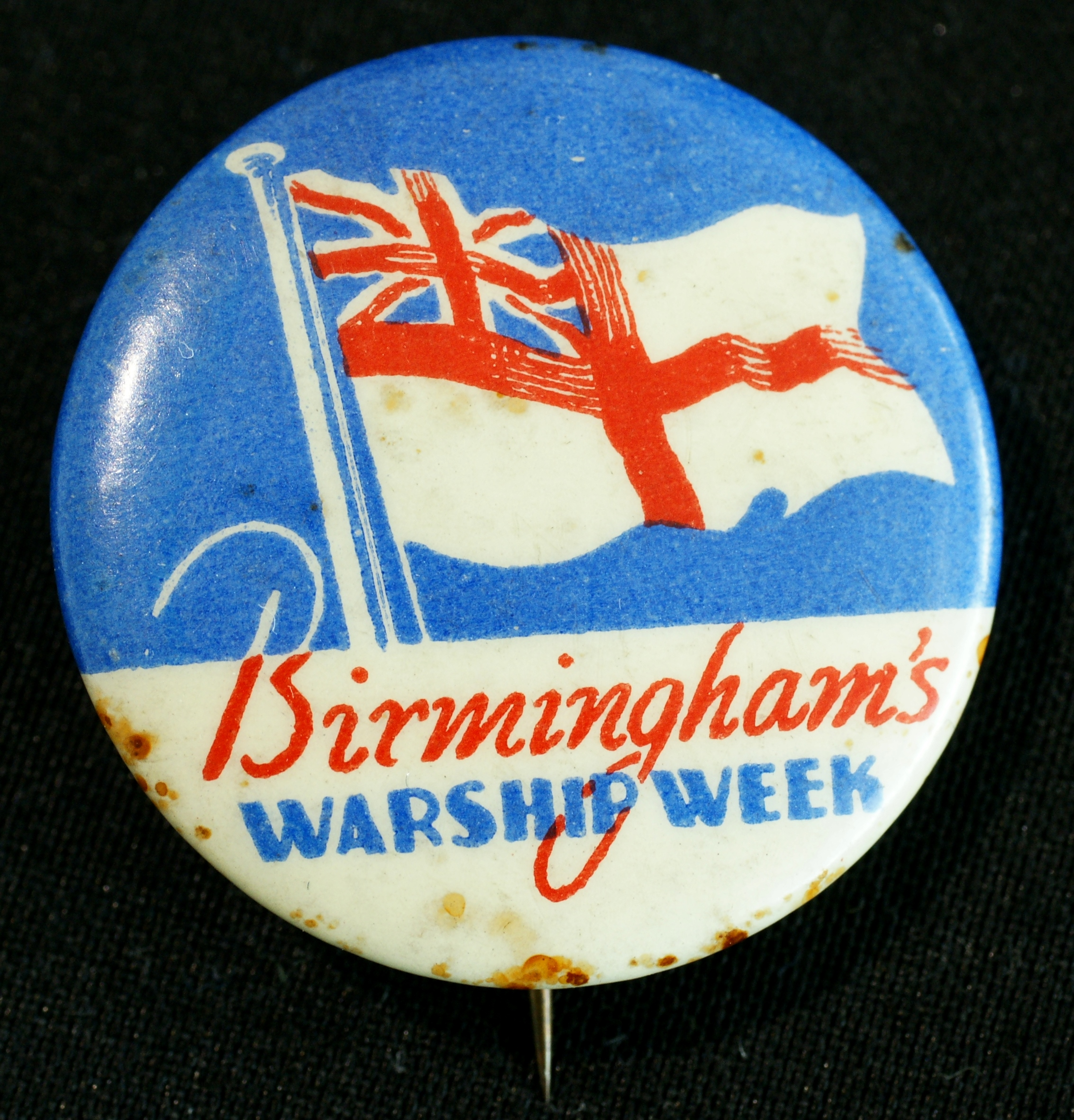
Fund-raising badge sold during Warship Week in Birmingham, now in Thinktank, Birmingham Science Museum

=== National savings ===
Between 1941 and 1942, the concept of National Savings was introduced by the British government. Each region in the country was provided with a savings target to achieve. This was based on the region's population, with each general level of savings having a class of warship assigned. This became known as Warship Week, due to its similarities with War Weapons Week – which was a drive to replace the materiel lost at Dunkirk through a savings campaign.

=== Success ===
The total amount raised by the Exchequer over the 24 weeks of the Warship Week campaign was £955,611,589, equivalent to about £52.1 billion in 2023. This included an amount realised in the weeks specifically designated Warship Weeks of £545,640,770, equivalent to about £29.8 billion in 2023. A community would sponsor a ship through individual savings in government bonds and national savings certificates. The campaigns were organised by the National War Savings Committee with the support of the Admiralty. There were a total of 1,178 warship weeks organised during the campaign, involving a total of 1,273 districts. A press announcement quoted the adoption of eight battleships, four carriers, forty-nine cruisers, three hundred and one destroyers, twenty-five submarines, one hundred and sixty-four corvettes and frigates and two hundred and eighty-eight minesweepers.

== See also ==
- British Home Front during the Second World War
- National Savings and Investments
- Tank Banks
