= Mark VI tank =

British heavy tank project

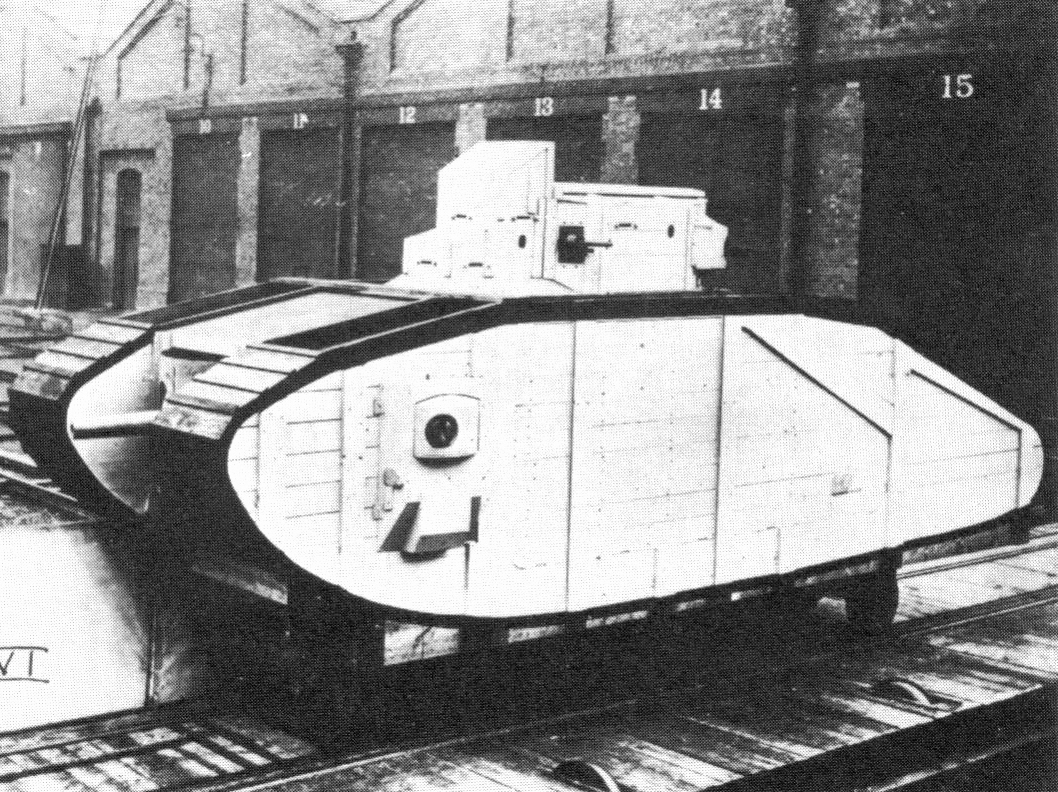
Wooden mockup of the proposed Mark VI, 1917

The Mark VI was a British heavy tank project from the First World War.

== Design ==
After having made plans for the continued development of the Mark I into the Mark IV, the Tank Supply Committee (the institute planning and controlling British tank production) in December 1916 ordered the design of two new types of tank: the Mark V and the Mark VI. The Mark V had to embody the most advanced features that could still be incorporated into the Mark I hull. The Mark VI should abandon the old hull entirely, reflecting only some general principles of the older tank.

On 13 July 1917, Metropolitan, the firm associated to Sir William Tritton, had a wooden mock-up ready of both models. As no design drawings of the Mark VI have survived, the pictures made on that date (and earlier on 23 June 1917 of the still partly unfinished models) form the major source of information.

The Mark V design still looked a lot like the Mark I. It had many changes in detail however, including smaller sponsons with cylindrical machine gun mounts, a lengthened hull, a larger cabin and a machine gun position at the back. This design was ultimately abandoned due to enormous delays in the development of the Mark IV. The tank eventually taken in production under that name was not the Mark IV, as originally planned, but basically a slightly changed Mark I. When at last in December 1917 the desired new engine and transmission could be built in, it was this type which became known as the Mark V.

The Mark VI design had a completely different hull, which was higher with rounded tracks on the front. It had no real sponsons; the side doors replacing them having protruding machine gun positions. The main armament was a single 57 mm gun low in the front of the hull. The driver is sitting in a square superstructure much further back, the corners of which each had a machine gun. On the superstructure a raised lookout post for the commander was fitted. It is known from a surviving text that the hull was to be compartmentalised with a separate engine room on one side containing also in line the drive gears of both tracks, the drive shaft for the track of the opposite side crossing the hull. Wider tracks (75 cm) were to be used. It was to be protected by fourteen millimetres of armour.

== Cancellation of production ==
When in September 1917 US headquarters in France decided to create a separate American Tank Corps with 25 battalions, among which five were to be Heavy Tank Battalions, Major James A. Drain ordered 600 of the most advanced British tank, being at the time the Mark VI. However, this endangered the plans of Albert Gerald Stern, then coordinating allied tank production, to produce a common Anglo-American tank, the Mark VIII. In December 1917 he ordered to halt the project. Not even a prototype was built.
