= Mark V Composite tank in Estonian service =

British heavy tank in Estonian Land Forces service

Mark V Composite
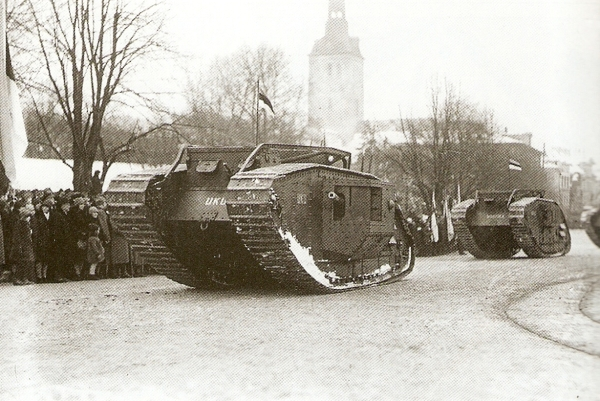
- Estonian Mark V Composite tanks on the Republic's anniversary parade on 24 February 1925
- Type: Heavy tank
- Place of origin: United Kingdom

Service history
- In service: 4; 1919–1940
- Used by: Estonia
- Wars: Estonian War of Independence

Production history
- Manufacturer: The Metropolitan Carriage, Wagon, and Finance Co., Birmingham
- Produced: 1918–1919

Specifications
- Mass: 33 tonnes (32 long tons; 36 short tons)
- Length: 8.25 m
- Width: 3.65 m
- Height: 2.65 m
- Crew: 9
- Armour: 6–12 mm
- Main armament: 1x57mm gun 200 rounds 3x7.7mm Hotchkiss Machine Guns; 10,350 rounds
- Engine: Ricardo petrol engine 150 brake horsepower (110 kW)
- Maximum speed: 8 kilometres per hour (5.0 mph)

The British Mark V Composite tank, a development of the Tank Mark I saw service with the Estonian Army in the Estonian War of Independence from 1919 to 1920.

== Design and development ==
The Mark V was intended to be built as completely new design. However, in December 1917, when the desired new engine and transmission became available, this design was abandoned and the designation switched to an improved version of the Mark IV, in fact a Mark IV as it was originally intended: more power (150 bhp) with a new Ricardo engine, improved steering mechanism and epicyclical transmission, only one driver was needed. A second cupola, with hinged sides, was added, towards the rear of the tank, so that the crew could attach the unditching gear without leaving the vehicle. Four hundred Mk V were built, 200 each of Males and Females. Several were converted to Hermaphrodites by swapping sponsons to give a single 6-pounder gun and extra machine gun.

== History ==
The first Mark V Composite tanks reached Estonia at the end of 1919. Although Estonia previously requested tanks from the Entente, their request was originally refused, as the Allies feared Estonia might be defeated by the Soviets. An unexpected opportunity to obtain such tanks came when the Northwestern Army under Yudenich was overpowered by the Soviets and retreated towards Estonia. During the dissolution of the Northwestern Army, the Commander of the Estonian Defence Forces Johan Laidoner received permission to take custody of the Northwestern Army's tanks. This action brought four Mark V and two Renault FT tanks to Estonia. According to the Commander-in-Chief's daily order nr. 770 on 26 November 1919, Captain Hans Vanaveski was ordered to organize a training unit under the name of Tank Class. This unit was placed under the direct orders of the Reserve Forces commander. This act was previously approved on 23 November by the Minister of War.

=== During the Soviet occupation ===
The heavy tank company was taken over by the Red Army in February 1941. The tanks were in a very poor condition and hardly able to move by their own power. As the Red Army did not have tank transport platforms for the railway, the tanks were left behind in a warehouse near Tallinn, which was soon after forgotten. The tanks were relocated again in August the same year when they were used to cover the Soviet retreat from Tallinn. Mark Vs were dug into the soil along the Pirita River coastal line in order to create stationary gun platforms for the defence line. There are no records however of the usage or success of this plan, yet it is certain that it was tried out.

=== Appearance in World War II ===
The ultimate fate of these four Estonian Mark V Composite tanks is believed to have been being melted down somewhere in the Third Reich into armour steel for the German total war effort.

== Gallery ==
Russian Northwestern Army tanks in Tallinn (1919)

Mark V "Wahtula" tank on the Auto-Tank Regiment summerdays

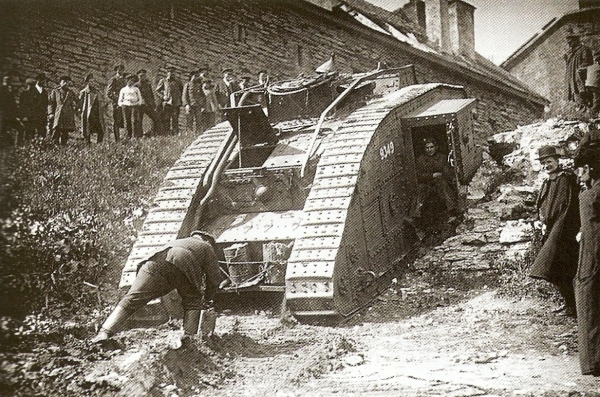
Demonstration drive near the Beach gates of Tallinn (1920)

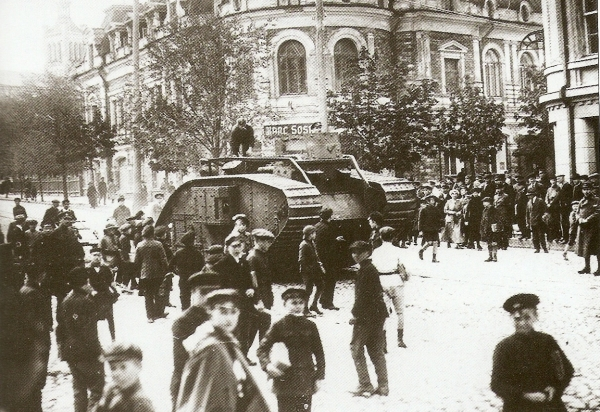
Driving along Pärnu highway (1920)

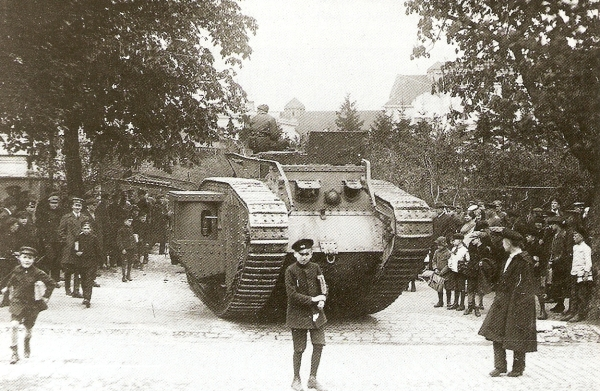
Driving along Tallinn (1920)

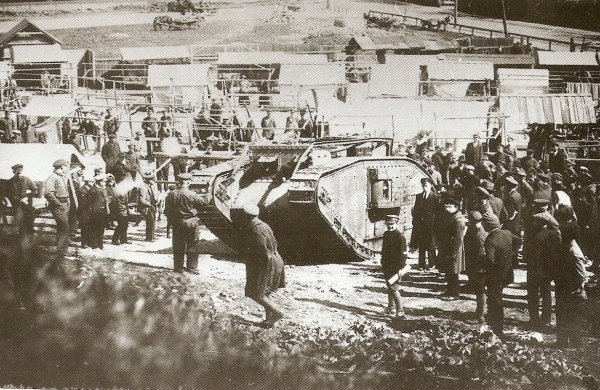
Driving along the hills of the Beach Gates of Tallinn (1920)

Estonian tank crew repairing the tank

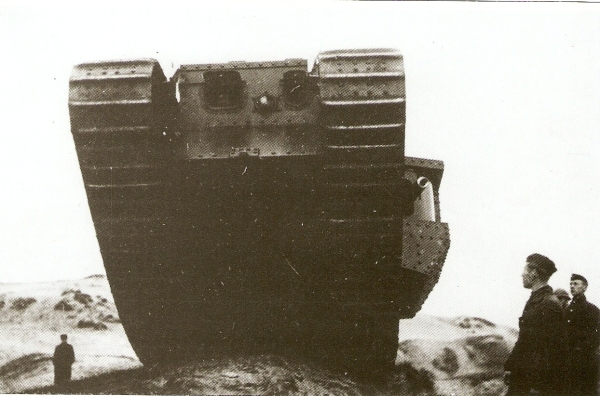
Mark V tank frontal view

== See also ==
- Military history of Estonia
