= Salute the Soldier Week =

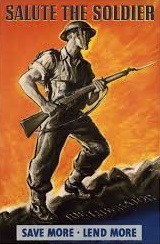
Salute the Soldier Poster

Salute the Soldier Weeks were British national savings campaigns during the Second World War, with the aim of British Army equipment being sponsored by a civil community. The Royal Air Force equivalent was Wings for Victory Week and the Royal Navy equivalent was Warship Week.

== Campaign ==
Each county was set a target of money to raise and local civic leaders were presented with plaques as a reward for the fund raising efforts.

The government had an initial campaign launched in September 1940 known as War Weapons Weeks – which was a drive to replace the materiel lost at Dunkirk. The amount realised in the weeks specifically designated War Weapons Weeks was £456,861,000, equivalent to about £26.1 billion in 2024. Warship Week was launched in October 1941, and in summer 1942, the government had a smaller campaign for British Army equipment known as Tanks for Attack: the amount realized from this campaign was not separately recorded. The following year was the RAF's turn and Wings for Victory Week was launched in March 1943.

Building on the success of the earlier campaigns, a large military event was held at Trafalgar Square in London in March 1944 to raise money for field hospitals and other military equipment under the new Salute the Soldier campaign. The amount realised in the weeks specifically designated Salute the Soldier Weeks was £628,021,000, equivalent to about £35.8 billion in 2024. The processions also upset the traffic for the civilian population.
