= Tank Banks =

British World War I fundraising campaign

The tank "Egbert" and crew

The tank "Julian" putting on a show

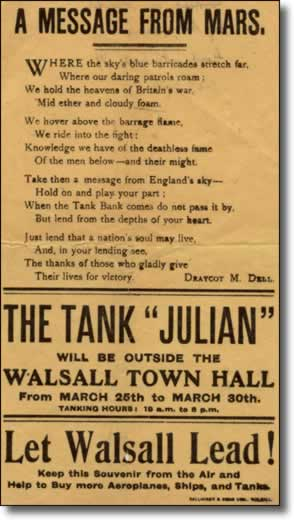
Pamphlet dropped on Walsall prior to a visit from "Julian"

The tank "Old Bill" and crew

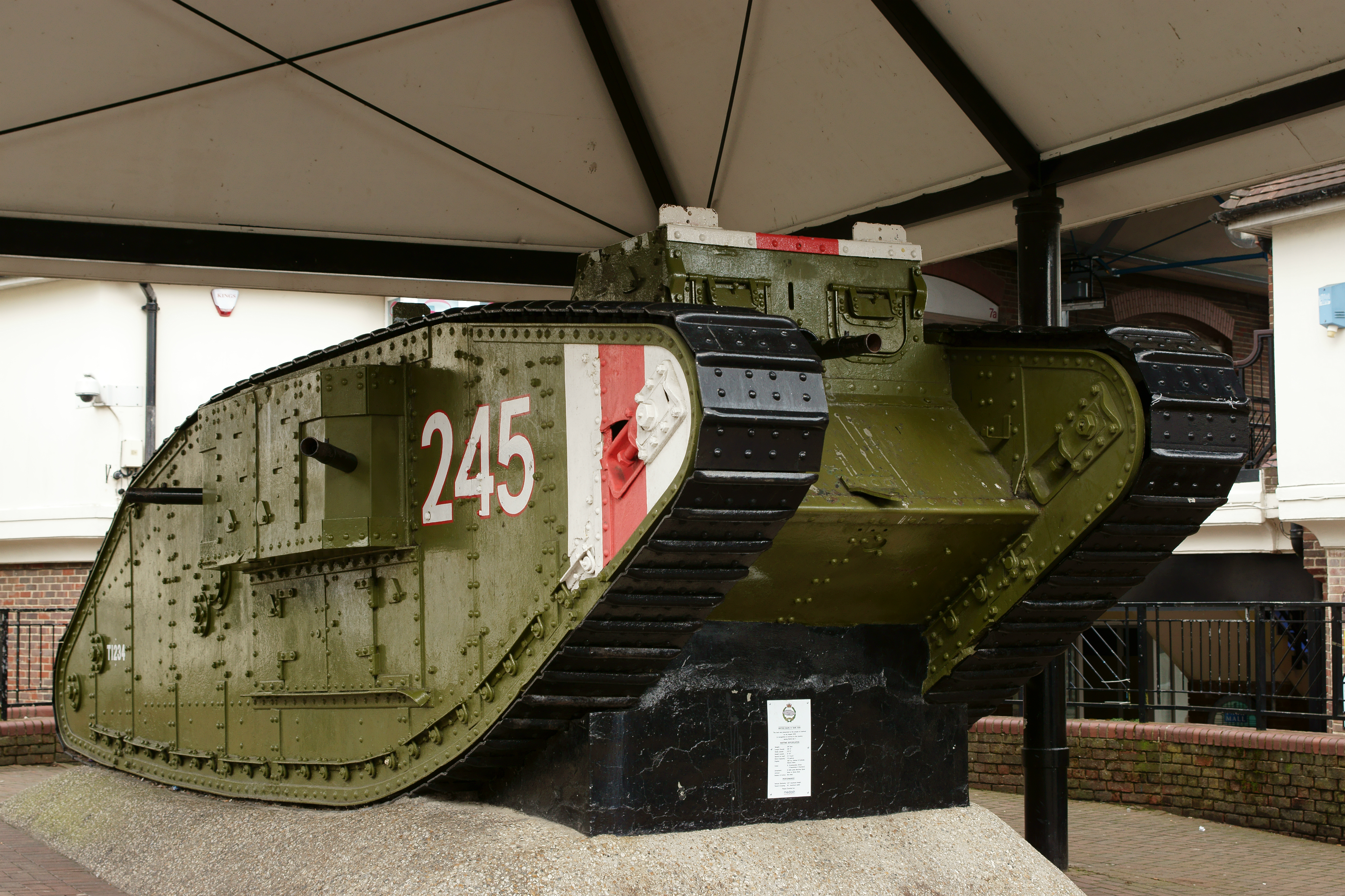
Ashford's presentation tank

Tank Banks was the name given to a World War I fundraising campaign by the British government. Six Mark IV male tanks toured the towns and cities of England, Scotland, and Wales, with the primary purpose being to promote the sale of government War Bonds and War Savings Certificates.

== History ==
In November 1917 two tanks took part in London's Lord Mayor's Show. The recent successful participation of the tank in the Battle of Cambrai had fired the public imagination: their appearance in the show proved very popular with the spectators who were fascinated by this new "wonder weapon". The National War Savings Committee decided to capitalize upon this fascination and use the tank to sell War Bonds and War Saving Certificates. On November 26, 1917, battle scarred Tank 141 "Egbert" was brought over from France and put on display in Trafalgar Square.

The campaign was soon extended to the whole of the country, the touring tanks would spend a week in a town or city with two young ladies selling war bonds from a table set up inside the tank. A competitive spirit was engendered between the visited locations; the town or city that invested the most per capita would win the tank "Egbert". The eventual winner of the competition was West Hartlepool, which raised £31 9s 1d per capita (between the period of October 1, 1918 - January 18, 1919). "Egbert" arrived in West Hartlepool on 29 April 1919 and was placed on Stranton Garth, remaining there until 1937 when the West Hartlepool Town Council voted on whether to keep the tank as a lesson of war or scrap the 'relic of barbarism'; with 20 votes to 12 the tank was scrapped.

== Programme ==
A tank would arrive with great fanfare; civic dignitaries and local celebrities would greet the tank and speeches would often be made atop it. The tank would be accompanied by soldiers and artillery guns, sometimes an aeroplane would drop pamphlets over the town or city prior to the tank's appearance exhorting the people to invest. The tank would usually put on a show for the crowds in order to demonstrate its capabilities. The visited town or city would have a fund raising target it tried to meet; the amount raised by each location would be reported in the national press, thus ensuring a strong competitive element, especially between the larger industrial cities.

The six touring tanks were:

- Tank 113 "Julian"
- Tank 119 "Old Bill"
- Tank 130 "Nelson"
- Tank 137 "Drake"
- Tank 141 "Egbert"
- Tank 142 "Iron Ration"

== Proceeds ==
Total investments in Tank Banks of over £2million:

- Glasgow £14,563,714
- Birmingham £6,703,439
- Edinburgh £4,764,639
- Manchester £4,430,000
- Bradford £4,060,000
- London (2 weeks) £3,423,261
- Newcastle £3,068,768
- Swansea £2,180,939
- Hull £2,186,820
- Leicester £2,063,250
- Liverpool £2,061,012
- West Hartlepool £2,367,333 - £37 per head of the population
- Sunderland £2,305,000
- Aberystwyth £682,448 - £75.80 per head of population, later confirmed as the highest in the Empire. Their quota was £25,000

== Presentation tanks ==
In 1919 the Treasury agreed to give 264 "war battered" tanks to various towns and cities in gratitude for their financial efforts. The National War Savings Committee decided which towns and cities would receive one of these presentation tanks. Upon receipt, the tanks tended to be sited in parks or commons and due to a lack of funds or general indifference they would subsequently just sit and rust.

All but one of these presentation tanks were sold for scrap or otherwise destroyed, prior to the end of World War II. Only Ashford's presentation tank still survives, mainly due to having an electricity sub station installed inside it in 1929. The tank is now a Registered War Memorial.

== See also ==
- Warship Week
- National Savings and Investments
