= Britannia (tank) =

Mark IV
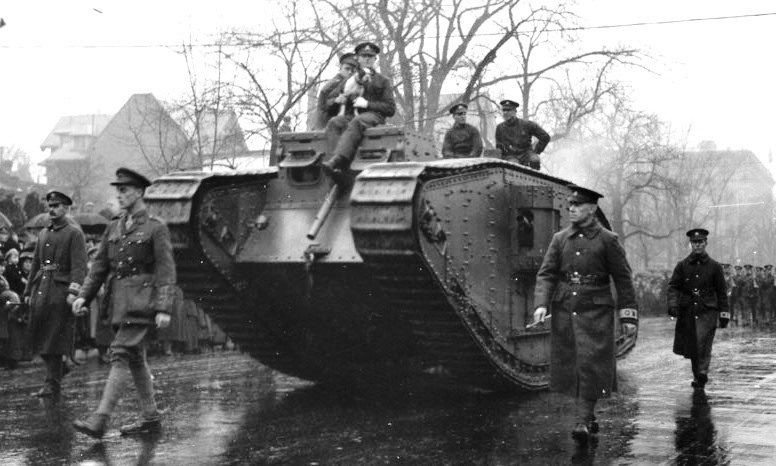
- British tank Britannia in Victory Loan Parade, Toronto, Ontario, Canada
- Type: Tank
- Place of origin: UK

Service history
- Used by: British Army; US Army
- Wars: First World War

Production history
- Designer: Walter Gordon Wilson; William Tritton
- Manufacturer: see text
- Unit cost: about £5,000

Specifications
- Mass: 31.4 tons (28.4 tonnes); Female: 27 tons (27.4 tonnes)
- Length: 26 ft 5 in (8.05 m)
- Width: Male: 13 ft 6 in (4.12 m)
- Crew: 8
- Armour: 0.5 inches (12 mm)
- Main armament: Female: five .303 Lewis guns
- Engine: Daimler-Foster, 6-cylinder in-line sleeve valve 16 litre petrol engine 105 bhp at 1,000 rpm
- Transmission: Primary: 2 Forward, 1 Reverse; Secondary – 2 speed
- Fuel capacity: 70 Imperial gallons
- Operational range: 35 mi (56 km)
- Maximum speed: 4 mph (6.4 km/h)

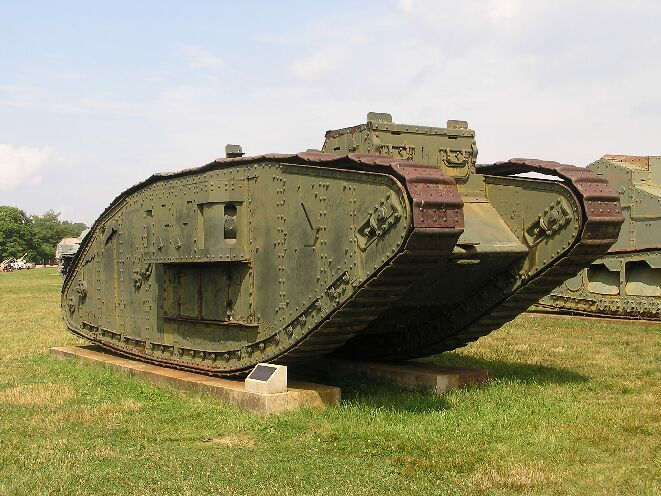
Liberty as it is now displayed at the United States Army Ordnance Museum, Aberdeen, Maryland

Britannia is a preserved First World War British Mark IV Female heavy tank. It toured Canada and the United States to raise money. Later renamed Liberty it is now displayed at the United States Army Ordnance Museum, Aberdeen, Maryland.

== History ==
The Tank was reported as taking part in battles in Flanders.

In 1917 it toured Canada as part of the Victory Loan Parade to sell war bonds; it was seen on the streets of Montreal on November 19, 1917, and Toronto on November 21, 1917.

On February 23, 1918, it was reported that it got into an accident during a training exercise at Fort Dix, New Jersey, the tank then toured, for the Liberty Loan parade under the Britannia name. It was in the second Liberty Loan parade in New York City during February of 1918. Also, appearing in Boston in April 1918.

== Preservation ==
It was renamed Liberty and is now displayed at the United States Army Ordnance Museum, Aberdeen, Maryland, joining the Ordnance Museum collection in 1919. After decades of exposure to the elements, it is in poor condition.

== See also ==
- Mephisto - a German A7V tank
