= William Foster & Co. =

Former English agricultural machinery company

William Foster and Co.
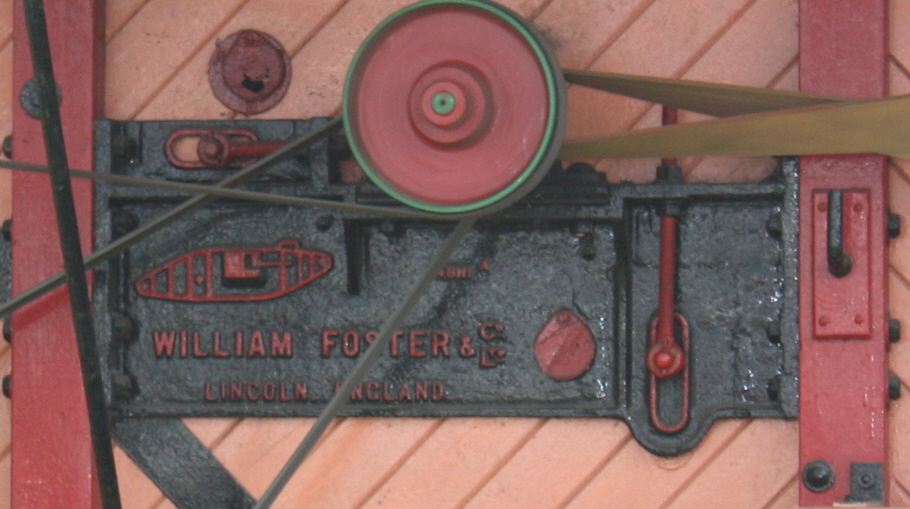
- Foster casting on threshing mc with Tank logo cast
- Industry: Engineering
- Founded: 1846. 1877 William Foster & Co.
- Fate: Purchased in 1960 by W.H. Allen, Sons and Co
- Headquarters: Waterside South, then Wellington Works, New Boultham, Lincoln, England,
- Key people: William Foster, Sir William Tritton
- Products: Portable engines, Threshing machiness, Traction engines, Tanks Whippet Light Tank Steamrollers,
- Subsidiaries: Gwynnes Limited

William Foster & Co Ltd was an agricultural machinery company based in Lincoln, Lincolnshire, England often called "Fosters of Lincoln." The company can be traced back to 1846, when William Foster purchased a flour mill in Lincoln. William Foster then proceeded to start small scale manufacturing of mill machinery and threshing machinery. The mill was converted to an iron foundry by 1856, thus becoming the original Wellington Foundry. By 1899 the works had moved to the Wellington foundry in New Boultham and the original works were then occupied by William Rainforth. During the First World War Fosters built some of the first tanks for the British Army.

== Agricultural machinery ==
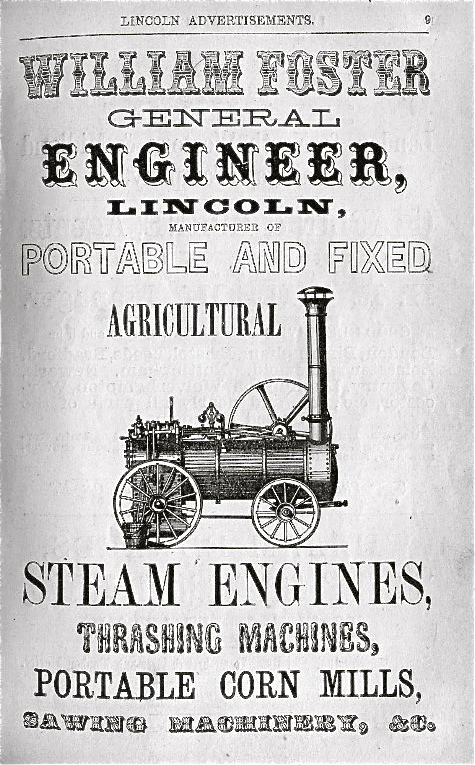
Foster's advertisement in 1863 for a Portable Engine

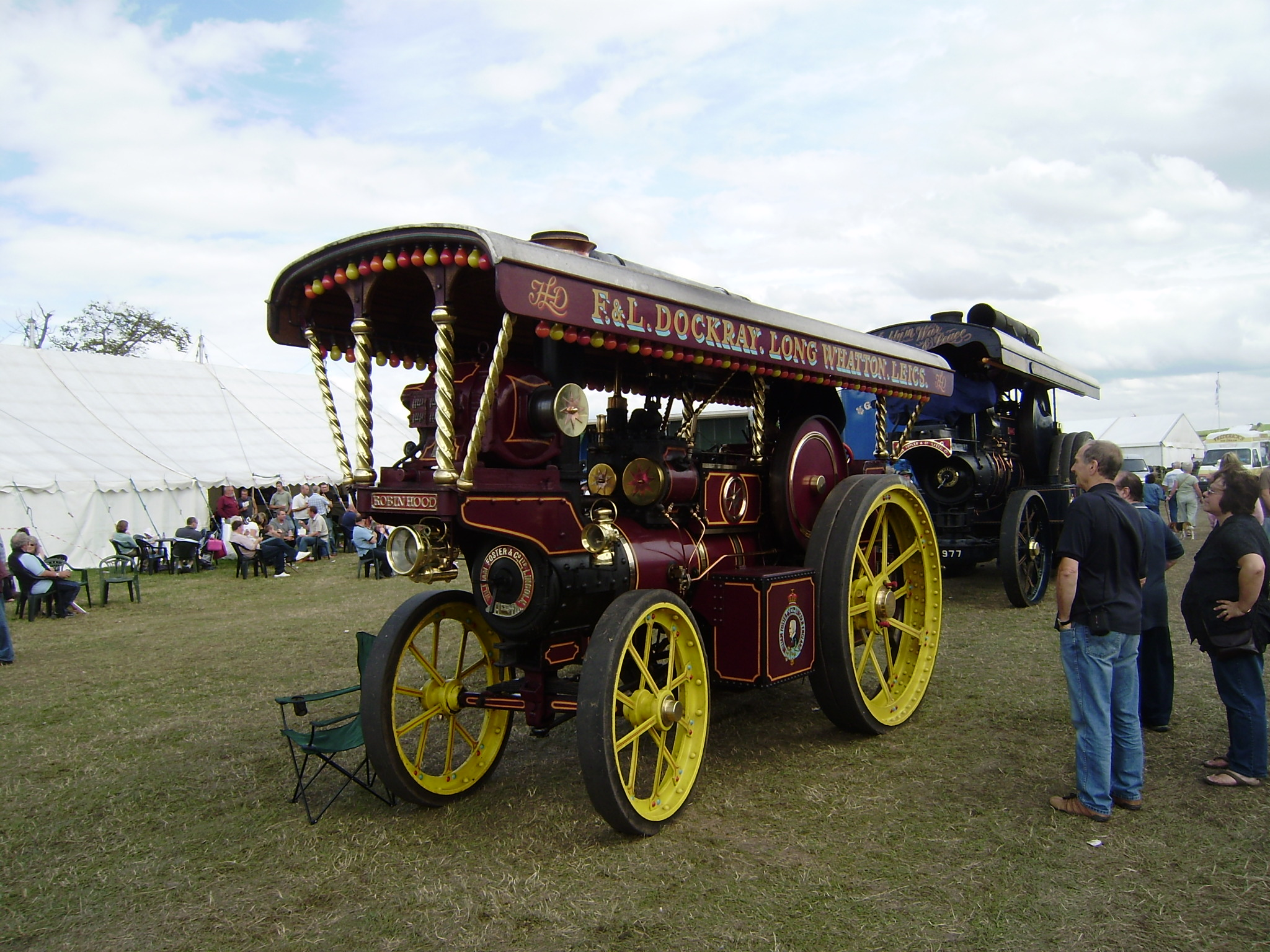
Foster showman's road locomotive "Robin Hood"

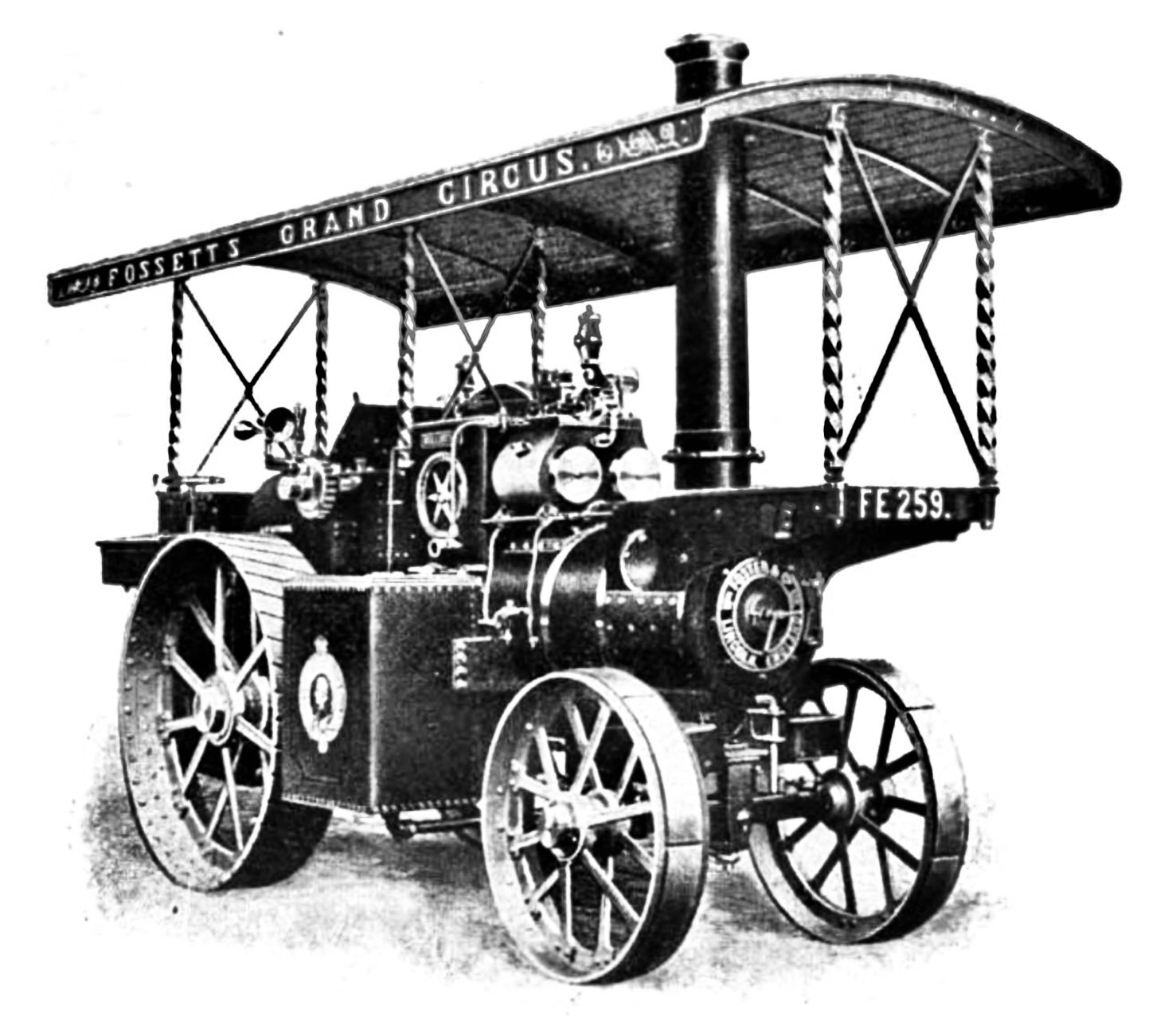
William Foster & Co. (1908)

The company was known for producing threshing machines, regarded as among the best available. They started making Portable engines around 1860. From 1889 they also made traction engines, such as the Foster Wellington and Showman's road locomotives. They sold their last traction engine in 1944 and their last threshing machine in 1961.

Foster were involved with Bramah Joseph Diplock, inventor of the Pedrail. In an account of the demonstration of a Pedrail tractor to the War Office in August 1904 it is recorded that the Pedrail tractor was built at 'Messrs Fosters of Lincoln'.

Foster were involved in a manufacturing deal with the newly formed commercial-vehicle department of Daimler in Britain to manufacture tractors, which Daimler launched in 1911, but were dropped after the war. The larger tractor used a 6-cylinder 105 bhp Daimler petrol sleeve-valve engine, and had three forward and one reverse gear. It was designed for direct ploughing, and had a 12000 lb drawbar pull. A 3 hp air-cooled single cylinder BSA engine was mounted on the footplate to start the main engine. See main article Foster-Daimler tractor. A smaller Daimler tractor of 36 hp was made from June 1911 with a 4-cylinder Daimler sleeve-valve engine, and had four forward gears and one reverse, it is not clear if Foster were involved with this.

Between 1919 and 1933 produced overtype steam wagons.

== First World War ==
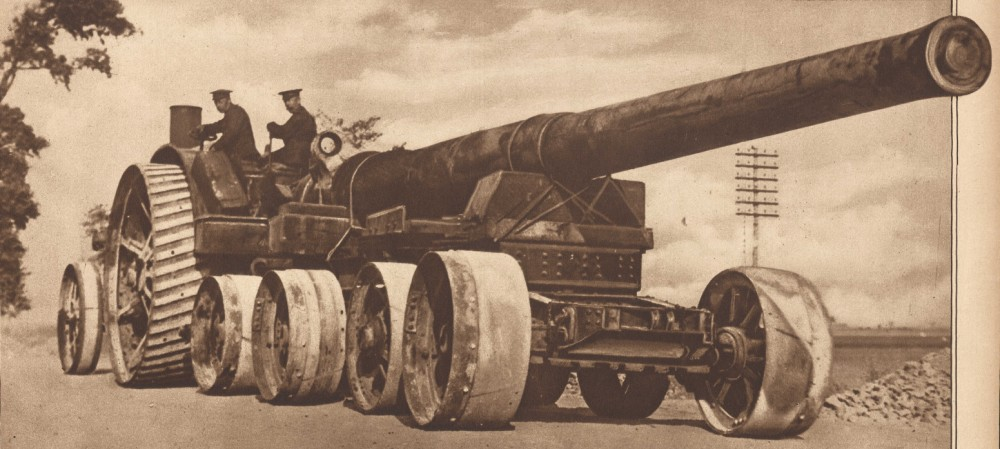
Foster-Daimler tractor towing artillery on a trailer built by Fosters, Flanders 1917. Photo by Ernest Brooks.

=== Artillery tractors ===
At the beginning of the war Fosters supplied 97 Foster-Daimler tractors to the Royal Marine Artillery to tow the BL 15-inch howitzer. One of these was briefly converted to the first prototype gap crossing machine, the Tritton trenching machine.

=== The tank ===
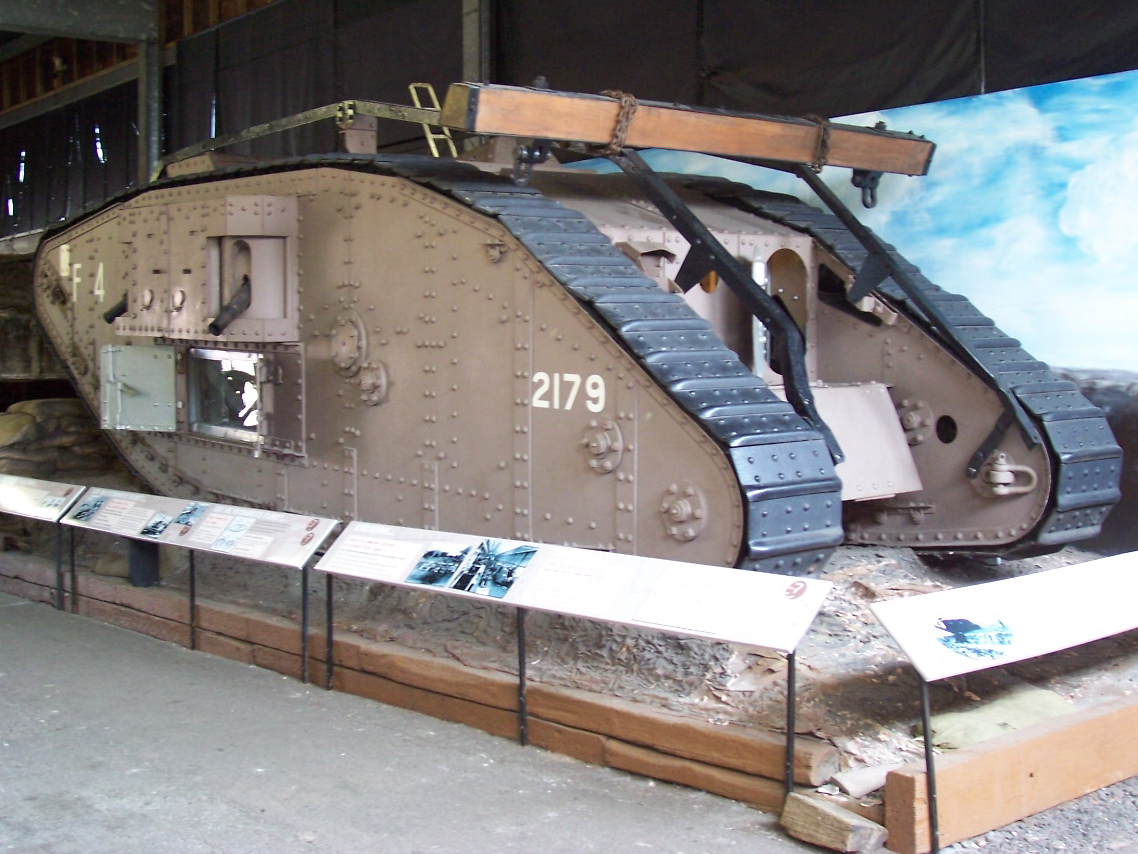
Mark IV tank in the Museum at Lincoln (a "Water carrier for Mesopotamia")

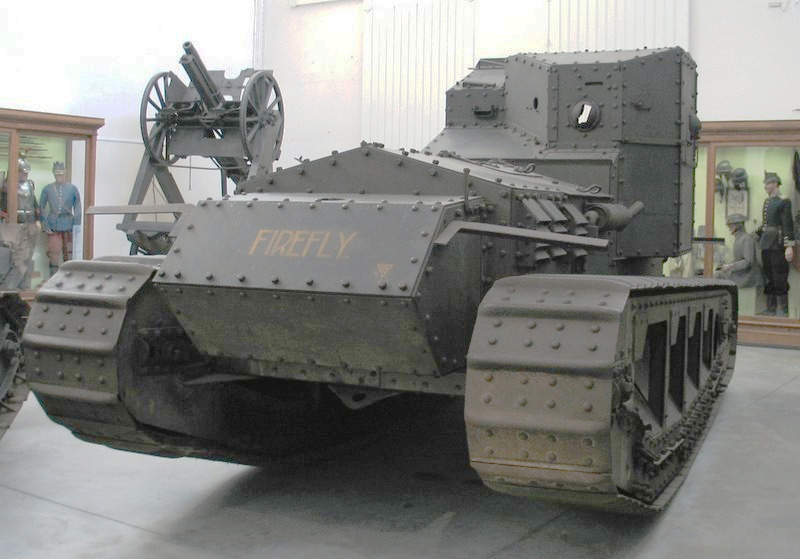
Foster's Whippet tank

Foster's, as builders of agricultural machinery, were involved in the production and design of the prototype tanks.

After the First World War, The Royal Commission on Awards to Inventors decided that the principal inventors of the tank were Sir William Tritton, managing director of Fosters, and Major Walter Wilson.

An example of one of the first tanks that were used in the First World War is preserved and on display in the Museum of Lincolnshire Life. This is a Mark IV. The tanks were described as "Water carriers for Mesopotamia" during production for security.

The firm used the symbol of the tank after the war on other machinery they built as a trade mark.

== Gwynnes Invincible Pumps ==
Gwynnes Limited manufactured centrifugal pumps from the mid 19th century in Hammersmith until acquired by Foster & Co. in 1927. Pump production was moved to Lincoln in 1930 and the company renamed Foster Gwynnes. Pump production ended in Lincoln in 1968.

In 1964 vertical pumps were supplied to the Deeping fen IDB for the pumping station at Pode Hole, where they remain in use.

== Takeover ==
The company was acquired by W.H. Allen, Sons and Co in 1960, and subsequently by Amalgamated Power Engineering.

== See also ==
- History of the tank – General details of development & background
- Ruston & Hornsby – Fellow Lincoln Firm, builders of steam engines
- Richard Garrett & Sons – Competitor for Showmans engines.
- Clayton & Shuttleworth – Fellow Lincoln firm and builders of steam engines.
- Marshall, Sons & Co. – Fellow Lincolnshire firm, and builder of Threshing machines.

== In fiction ==
There is a traction engine in both Rev W Awdry's Railway Series and The Thomas & Friends TV Series based on one of these named Trevor.

== Bibliography ==
- Evans, Gwyn (2015) A Reappraisal of Lincoln Tank Production in 1916, Lincolnshire History and Archaeology, pp 95–105.
- Lane M.R.(1997) The story of the Wellington Foundry Lincoln: A History of William Foster and Co. Ltd. Unicorn Press. London.
