= Foster-Daimler tractor =

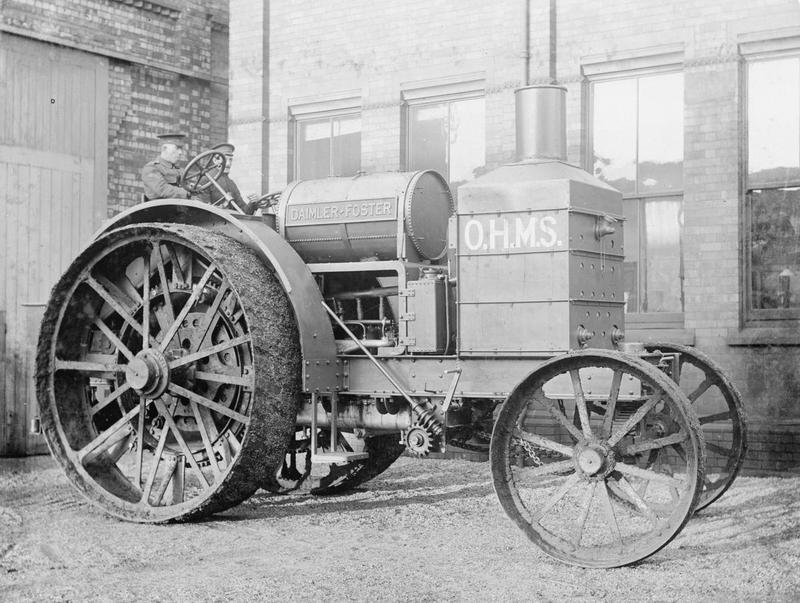
- Type: Tractor
- Place of origin: United Kingdom

Service history
- Used by: United Kingdom
- Wars: First World War

Production history
- Manufacturer: William Foster & Co. & Daimler Company Limited
- Unit cost: £1,866
- No. built: 97 for Royal Marine Artillery

Specifications
- Mass: Almost 14 long tons (14 t)
- Engine: Daimler 6-cylinder double-sleeve valve petrol 105 bhp (78 kW)
- Drive: 4x2
- Transmission: 2 speed
- References: Vehicles at war & The devil's chariots

The Foster-Daimler tractor, often called the Daimler-Foster tractor, was a heavy tractor built by William Foster & Co. in the early 20th century. It was used by the armed forces of the United Kingdom as a heavy artillery tractor during the First World War, it also formed the basis of the experimental Tritton trenching machine and its power unit was used in early British tanks.

== Design ==
The Foster-Daimler tractor weighed almost 14 long tons (14 t), it was powered by a Daimler 6-cylinder double-sleeve valve petrol engine that developed 105 brake horsepower (78 kW) with a two-speed gearbox. The tractors were driven by traction engine-type rear wheels that were 8 feet (2.4 m) in diameter and 2 feet (0.61 m) wide; they could tow loads of 35 long tons (36 t).

== History ==
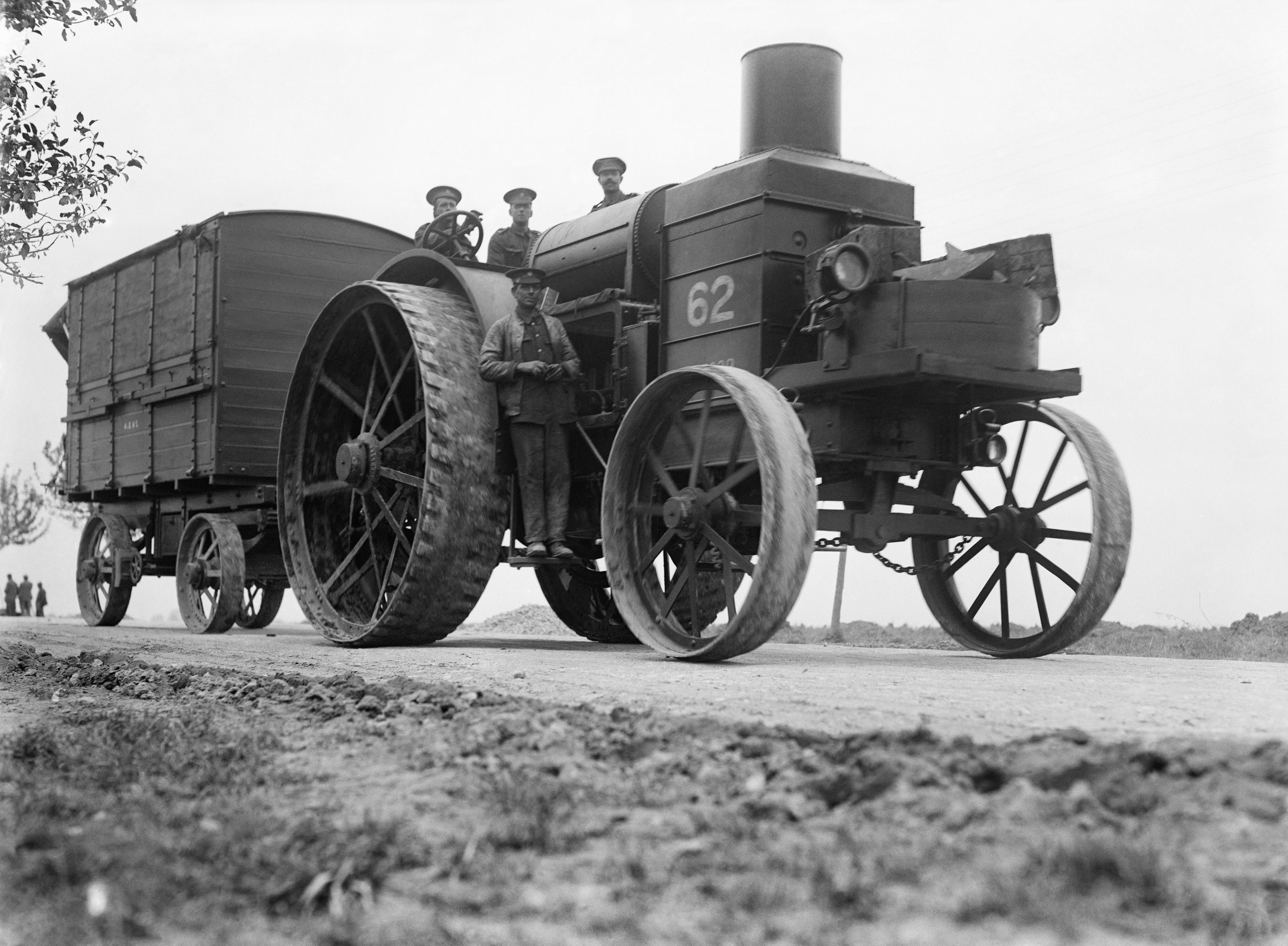
Foster-Daimler hauling a wagon during the Battle of the Somme

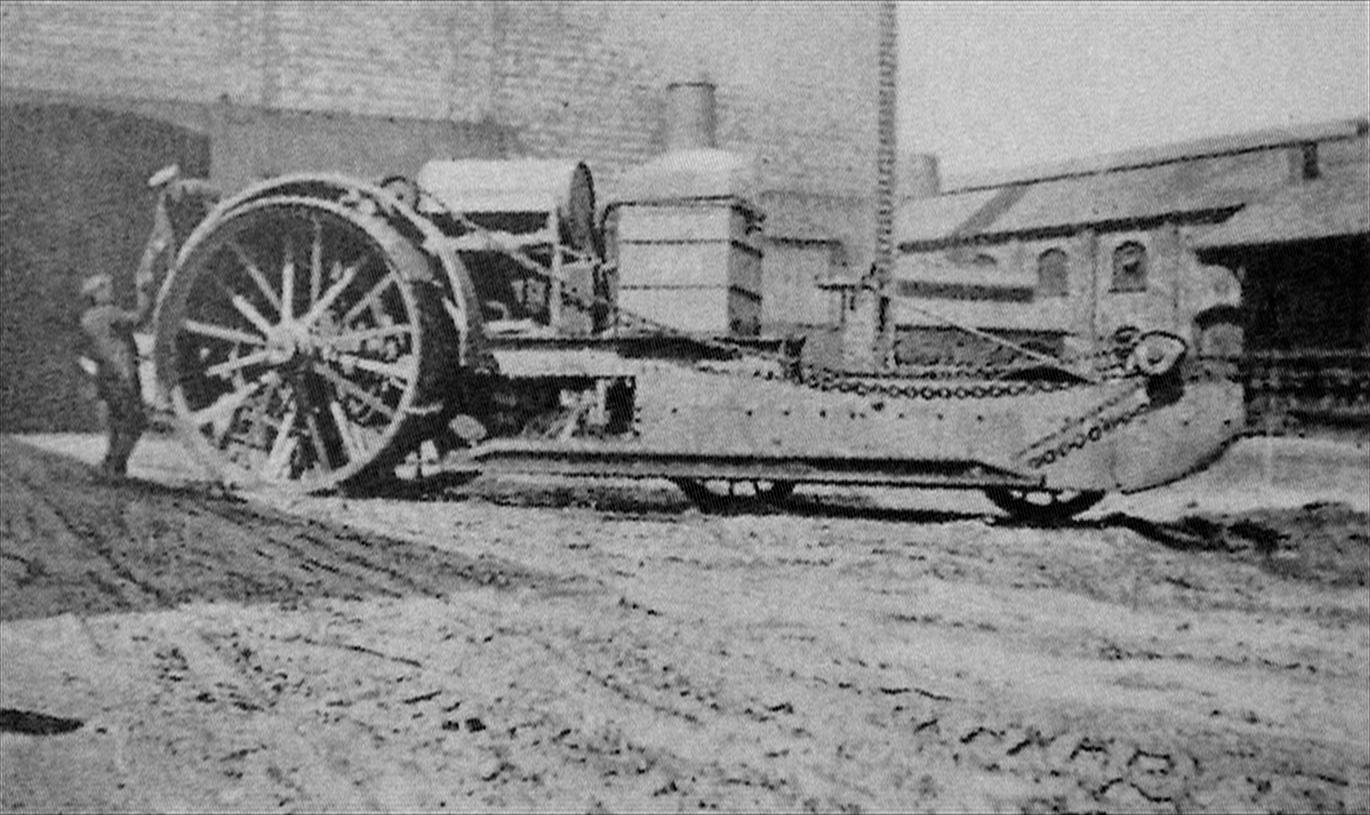
The Tritton trenching machine

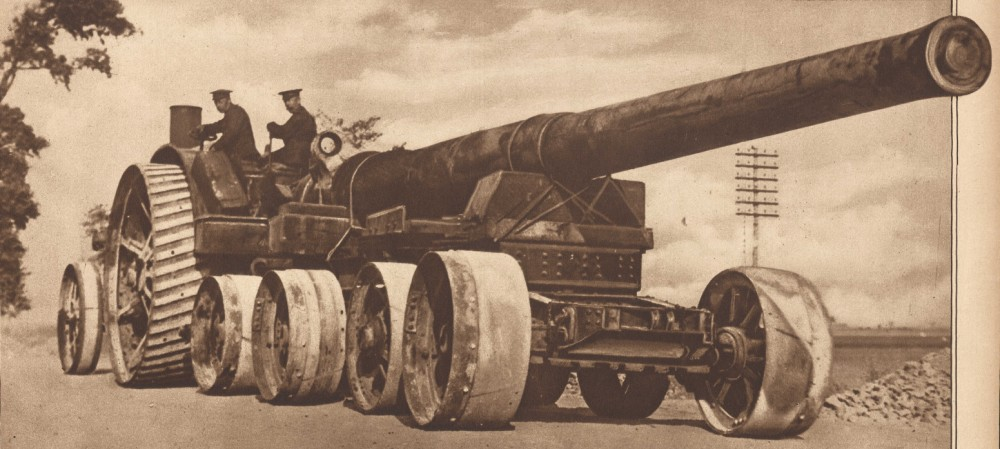
Foster-Daimler hauling a BL 7.5-inch Mk III gun

The Foster-Daimler tractor was first built in 1912 as a joint venture between Lincoln based agricultural machinery manufacturers William Foster & Co. and Daimler Company Limited. It was produced as a petrol-engined heavy tractor for export to countries with limited coal reserves, principally in South America.

In late 1914 the Coventry Ordnance Works developed the BL 15-inch howitzer. Weighing over 60 long tons (61 t) these howitzers were broken down into several loads for road transportation. Upon receipt of an order for twelve 15-inch howitzers from the Royal Navy, the general manager of the Coventry Ordnance Works Rear-Admiral Reginald Bacon approached Daimler for the provision of tractors to tow the ordnance. Daimler referred Bacon to William Tritton, the managing director of William Foster. It was agreed the Foster-Daimler tractor would be adapted for the purpose of towing the broken down 15-inch howitzers, and an order for 97 tractors was placed at £1,866 per unit, along with 291 special towed wagons.

Acceptance trials for the tractor were conducted in Lincoln on 10 December 1914, and in early 1915 the 15-inch howitzers and the Foster-Daimler tractors were taken into service with the Royal Marine Artillery attached to the Royal Naval Division. In service, eight Foster-Daimler tractors were used to tow each 15-inch howitzer. The tractors could be used conventionally when travelling on roads or, if fitted with flanged wheels, could move along railways.

=== Tritton trenching machine ===
The December 1914 acceptance trials included a bridging demonstration where a tractor towed two trailers of bridging timbers to a broad ditch; after engineers spanned the ditch, the tractor and trailers were waved across and one of the trailers toppled over the side, collapsing the bridge. After this accident Bacon remarked to Tritton that an armed and armoured vehicle that could lay its own bridge would be of great value. Bacon continued to press Tritton about the idea and designs were drawn up for a modified Foster-Daimler tractor capable crossing a gap. These were presented to Winston Churchill by the end of December and an order was placed for the production of an experimental prototype.

The prototype, known by various names including the Tritton trenching machine, the Tritton trencher and the Tritton trench crossing machine, consisted of a Foster-Daimler tractor with the usual front wheels removed and a sub-frame fitted to the front of the chassis which had two wide road wheels in tandem – increasing the vehicles overall length to approximately 31 ft (9.4 m) – and two steel bridging girders 15 ft (4.6 m) in length were hung below the chassis on either side. As the vehicle approached a trench the front wheel would protrude across, and as it made contact the girders were lowered allowing the machine to drive across the trench. Once across, the vehicle would winch the girders across, reverse over them and be prepared to cross another trench. Bacon proposed fitting every trencher with a pair of headlights and another light on each side of the vehicles, each with glass 2 feet (0.61 m) in diameter and painted with the head of a ferocious Chinese warrior to unnerve the enemy during night attacks.

Initially, the machine was to be ready for demonstration by 1 February 1915. This was subsequently delayed to mid-February but due to further various delays did not occur until 9 June 1915. The machine had little difficulty in laying the girders over single trenches 8 ft (2.4 m) wide, but after crossing it required at least 25 ft (7.6 m) of clear ground to retrieve the girders. It was also found to be extremely nose-heavy, too cumbersome, and underpowered. Despite the design's ingenuity, it was found to be impractical and the tractor was returned to its original configuration at a cost of £20.

=== Legacy ===
Probably the greatest contribution the Foster-Daimler tractor made to the war effort was to bring William Foster & Co, and particularly William Tritton, into the development and production of the tank. Tritton was one of the engineers who developed the first completed tank design, Little Willie and its successor "Mother" ("Big Willie"), as well as the Mark A "Whippet" and Mark C "Hornet" medium tanks, with William Foster & Co. conducting much of the production.

Little Willie, Mother, and the unchanged Mark I tank used the Foster-Daimler tractor's 105 brake horsepower Daimler engine, gear-box and differential, as it was one of the few power units available in England with the required power, speeding up development and production. They were also used in the Mark II, Mark III, and Mark IV tanks. Later, to increase the power of the engine, it was modified with aluminium pistons and dual carburettors to deliver 125 brake horsepower (93 kW), the upgraded engine being installed in the last 200 Mark IV tanks.
