= Amalgamated Power Engineering =

- Type: Privately held company
- Industry: Engineering
- Predecessors: W. H. Allen, Sons & Company Ltd. and Belliss and Morcom
- Founded: 1968
- Defunct: 1981
- Fate: Acquired
- Successor: Northern Engineering Industries
- Headquarters: Birmingham, West Midlands, United Kingdom
- Area served: United Kingdom
- Products: Engines, pumps, compressors, gas processing plant

Amalgamated Power Engineering (APE) was a British engineering holding company, created through the 1968 merger of W.H. Allen, Sons and Co and Belliss and Morcom. It was acquired in 1981 by Northern Engineering Industries

== History ==
The company was created in 1968 through the merger of W. H. Allen, Sons & Company Ltd. (which had absorbed William Foster & Co. in 1960) and Belliss and Morcom.

In 1966, the receiver of Crossley Brothers of Manchester, sold the Crossley-Premier Engines and Furnival and Co businesses to Belliss and Morcom (B&M) of Birmingham, West Midlands. In 1968 B&M agreed to a merger with W.H. Allen, Sons and Co of Bedford, to form Amalgamated Power Engineering (APE), 60% owned by Allen's shareholders (which included William Foster & Co.) and 40% by Belliss and Morcom; which instantly became a leading manufacturer of engines. In 1968, APE reached agreement with Cooper-Bessemer to allow C-B to sell APE's gas treatment plant worldwide. In 1969, APE's Allen Gwynnes Pumps subsidiary acquired the industrial pumps business of Vickers plc based in Barrow in Furness.

After a difficult period in the 1970s, when due to ongoing losses APE sold a number of subsidiaries, in 1981 APE was acquired by Northern Engineering Industries plc, based in Gosforth, Newcastle upon Tyne. NEI shut most of the old central-Birmingham factories, consolidated the products around compressors, and moved B&M to Redditch. NEI itself was then acquired by Rolls-Royce plc in 1989.
