= Belliss and Morcom =

Belliss & Morcom
- Type: Private
- Industry: Engineering
- Predecessor: R. Bach and Co
- Founded: 1852
- Founder: George Edward Belliss; Joseph J. Seekings; Alfred Morcom
- Successor: Amalgamated Power Engineering
- Headquarters: Redditch, England
- Number of locations: Redditch
- Area served: Global
- Products: Reciprocating engine Reciprocating compressor
- Parent: Gardner Denver
- Website: Belliss.com

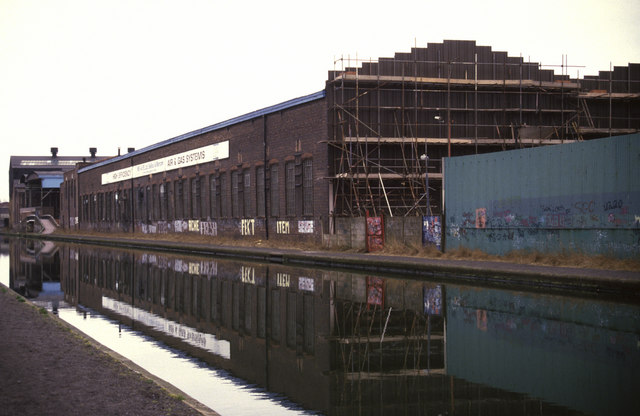
The former Ledsam Street Works of Belliss and Morcom works, located in Ladywood, Birmingham in 1988

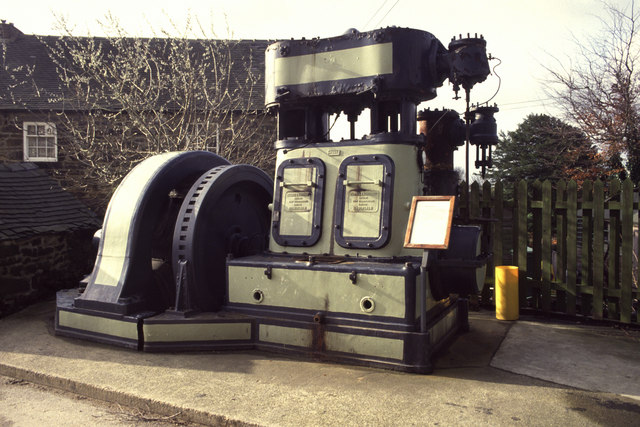
Belliss and Morcom reciprocating engine and generator set, preserved at the Crich Tramway Museum

Belliss and Morcom is a manufacturer and supplier of oil-free reciprocating compressors, technologies and services. Founded in 1852 in Birmingham, West Midlands, it is now a division of Ingersoll Rand based in Redditch, Worcestershire, England.

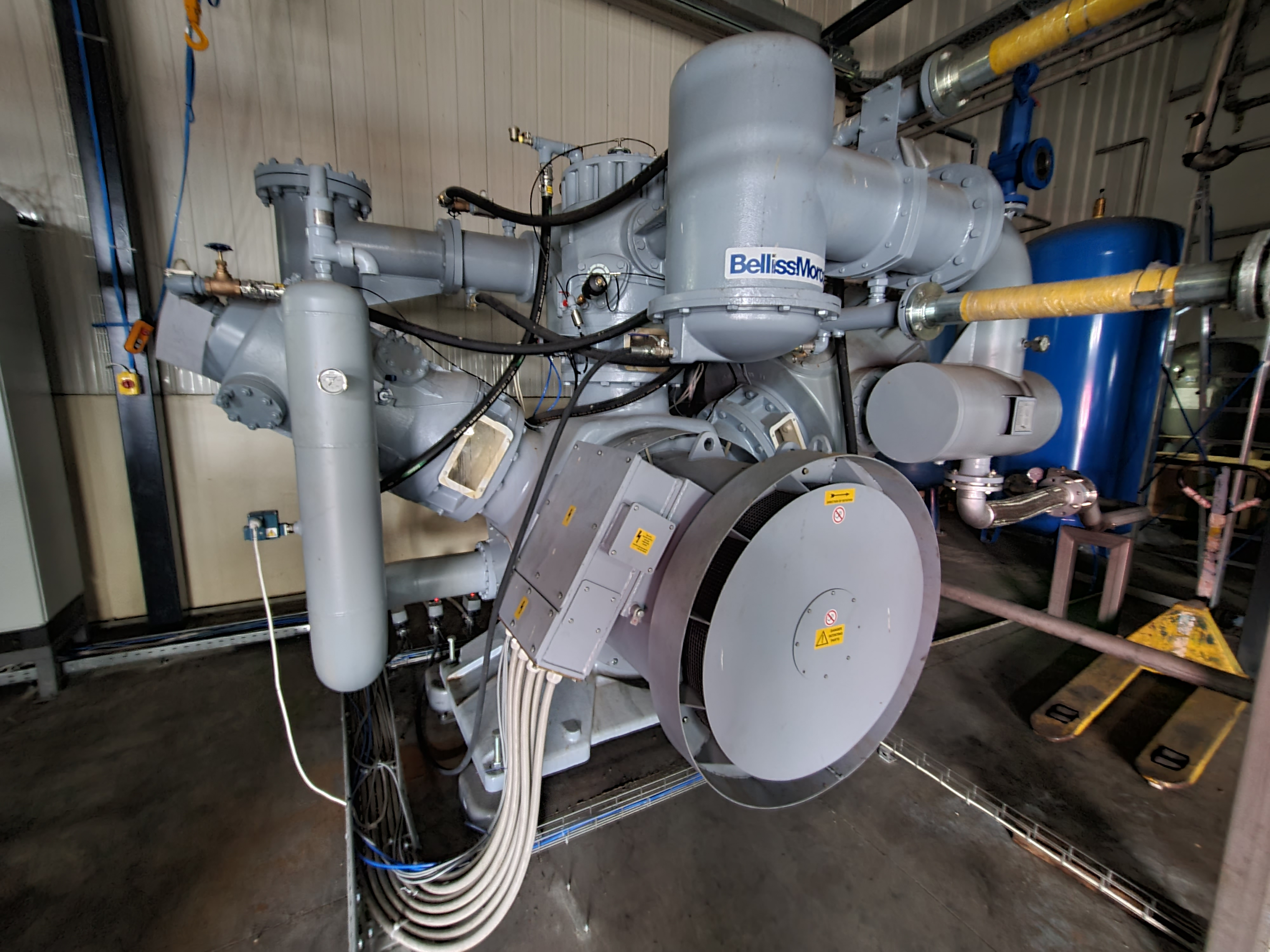
High pressure reciprocating compressor from Belliss and Morcom, used in the bottling industry.

== History ==
Shortly after completing his articles of apprenticeship, in 1862 George Edward Belliss acquired the engineering business of R. Bach and Co, then located at 13-14 Broad Street, Islington, Birmingham. He then went into partnership with Joseph J. Seekings, forming the limited partnership Belliss and Seekings. The partnership came to the end in 1866, but Belliss continued the business as G. E. Belliss and Co. In 1875, the organisation moved to larger premises at Ledsam Street, the bombed-out and derelict former works of James Archdale and Co, Ladywood. Further expansions in 1899 and 1902 involved moving manufacturing from the Ledsam Street premises to nearby Icknield Square followed by expansion on land adjacent to Rotton Park Street.

In 1884, Belliss invited Royal Navy engineer Alfred Morcom to join the firm as a partner. Previously chief engineer at Sheerness dockyard, he had gained a first-class certificate in steam engineering at the Navy's training college. Up to this point, Belliss and Morcom had specialised in producing electrical generator sets, consisting of a steam engine paired with a conjoined dynamo, to create electricity for electrical power companies, councils, hospitals, industrial premises and water and sanitation works. With the addition of Morcom, it began selling into the marine market.

From 1885 onwards, the organisation received further orders from J. Samuel White of Cowes, Isle of Wight, for main power and generating machinery for Royal Navy torpedo boats. The companies subsequently went into a limited production partnership, with Morcom also assisting White in Royal Navy trials of early versions of the torpedo net. In 1887, the Royal Navy placed an order directly with Belliss and Morcom for a triple-expansion engine-based main power and generator set for all 13 of the Sharpshooter class torpedo gunboats, designed by White.

In 1891, chief draughtsman Albert Charles Pain used a valveless oil pump and pressure to create forced lubrication. It put a constant film of oil on the bearings, reducing wear and increasing performance and reliability. In 1891, the engine was shown in the Science Museum, London.

In 1893, G.E. Belliss and Co incorporated as a private limited company. In 1899, after opening a new factory in Icknield Square, the company changed its name to Belliss and Morcom, and issued further shares. Customers during this period included engines for the electricity supply plants for the cities of Bury St Edmunds, Gloucester and Port Dundas for Glasgow Corporation Tramways. The expansion required the building of another new factory at Rotton Park Street.

In 1907, the company built one experimental double-decker bus for the London General Omnibus Co. By the start of World War I, the company was producing a standard range of 10 brake horsepower (7.5 kW) to 3,000 brake horsepower (2,200 kW), which could be deployed for lighting, electrical power and rotational power for mills. The company was also producing: condensing plants; air compressors; fan engines; pumping engines; paraffin engines.

Having produced internal combustion diesel engines during the war, the company developed and launched its range in 1919, which continued in production until the mid-1930s. These were again deployed in power generation. In 1922, the company were commissioned to install six ex-Imperial German Navy submarine diesel generators into the corporation power station in London Road, Southend-on-Sea.

=== Merger ===
The late-1960s changed the company a great deal. In 1966, the receiver of Crossley Brothers sold the Crossley-Premier Engines and Furnival and Co businesses to Belliss and Morcom. In 1968, the company agreed on a merger with W.H. Allen, Sons and Co. The new Amalgamated Power Engineering was owned 60% by Allen's and 40% by B&M shareholders.

In 1981 Amalgamated Power Engineering was acquired by Northern Engineering Industries plc, based in Gosforth, Newcastle upon Tyne. NEI itself was then acquired by Rolls-Royce plc in 1989.

== Present ==
Belliss and Morcom was acquired from Rolls-Royce by Powell Duffryn, and the company was merged with Hamworthy. This merger later resulted in the amalgamation of manufacturing in Gloucester and the final cessation of Belliss and Morcom as a Birmingham manufacturing company.

In 2001, NYSE-listed Gardner Denver acquired the Hamworthy businesses, including Belliss and Morcom, from Powell Duffryn. Belliss and Morcom remained in Gloucester until around 2010 when the acquisition by Gardner Denver of CompAir Compressors led to a consolidation of the two businesses at the CompAir site in Redditch.

Today the company manufactures, supplies and services oil-free reciprocating compressors, with a specialist division focusing on recycled PET plastic moulding.
