= Terry Harrison (industrialist) =

British industrialist (1933–2019)

Sir Terence Harrison (April 1933 – 21 June 2019) was an industrialist from the northeast of England who was Chief Executive of Rolls-Royce Holdings plc.

== Career ==
Harrison was born in Wingate, County Durham, the son of a miner and a shop assistant. After attending the local grammar school he undertook an apprenticeship with Richardsons Westgarth & Company before graduating with a mechanical engineering degree from Durham University in 1955. Following national service with the Royal Electrical and Mechanical Engineers, he joined Clarke Chapman as an engineering graduate and became managing director in 1969. He went on to be Chief Executive of Northern Engineering Industries from 1983 to 1986 and then Chairman of Northern Engineering Industries from 1986 to 1989. After Northern Engineering Industries was acquired by Rolls-Royce Holdings, he was chief executive of that company as well from 1992 to 1996.

Harrison was knighted in January 1996. In retirement he was chairman of Alfred McAlpine and, briefly, of Newcastle United F.C. from March 1997 to May 1998. He died on 21 June 2019 at the age of 86.

== Family ==
Harrison married June Forster in 1956; they had two sons.
