= Bruce Peebles & Co. Ltd. =

Defunct engineering company

Coordinates: 55°58′20″N 3°13′34″W

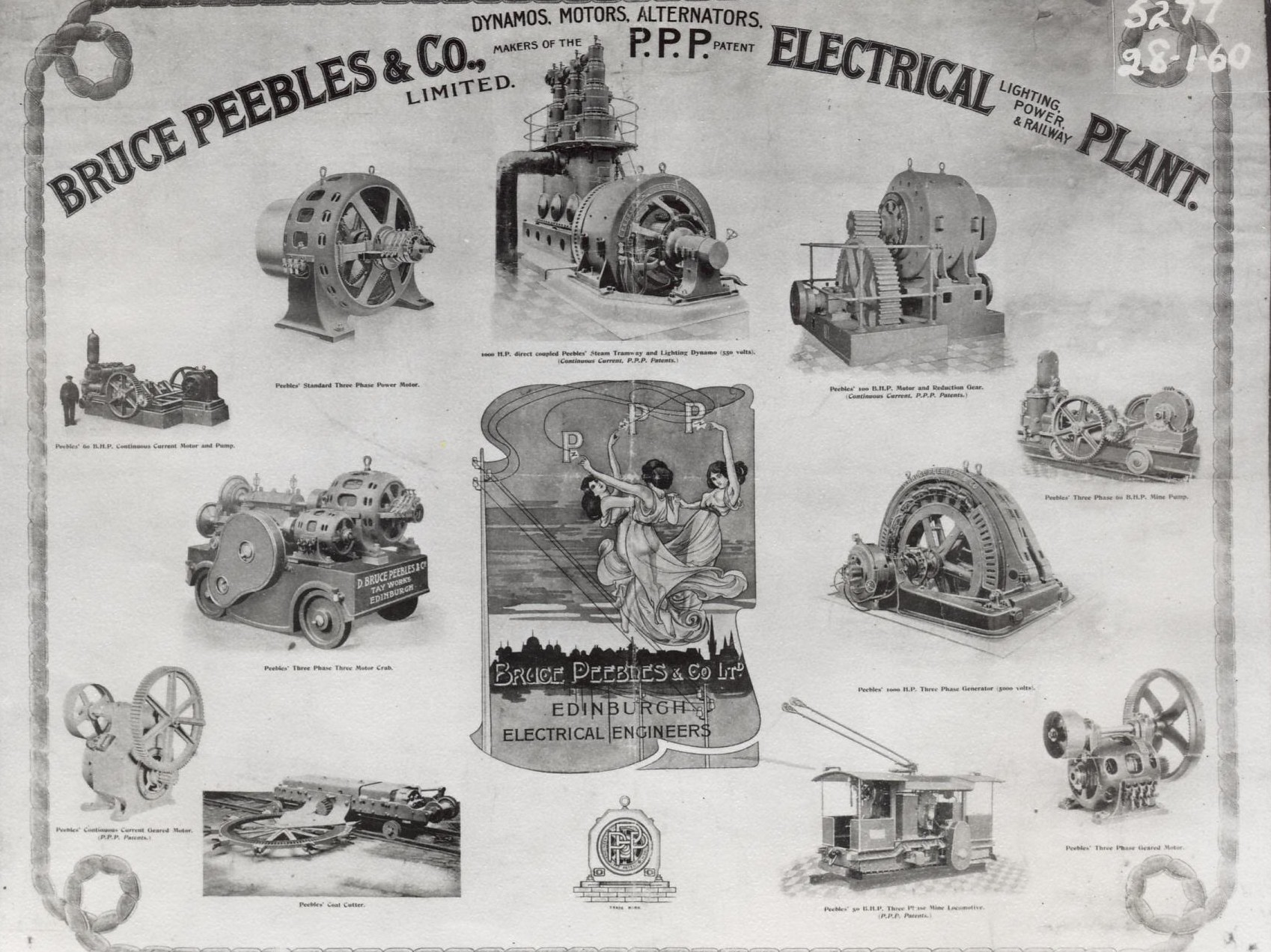
Advert c.1900

Interior of rotating plant works 1956

Tank under construction, for Ratcliffe-on-Soar station 1966

Aerial view of Edinburgh works 1978

Reactor under test 1979

Bruce Peebles & Co. Ltd. was an Edinburgh industrial electrical engineering company.

== Early history ==
The company was founded as D. Bruce Peebles & Co. by Scottish engineer David Bruce Peebles (1826–1899) in Edinburgh in 1866. The company initially specialised in gas engineering but later expanded to include electrical engineering as well. It continued to trade after Peebles' death and, in 1902, the name was changed to Bruce Peebles & Co. Ltd. The company held the British manufacturing rights for the Cascade converter and a licence to manufacture three-phase electrical equipment designed by Ganz of Budapest.

== Canadian Electric Traction Company ==
In 1903, Peebles expanded into Canada. Along with other investors, it formed the Canadian Electric Traction Company and supplied the three-phase equipment, car motors and generators for the South Western Traction Company of London, Ontario. The main line ran 28-miles between London and Port Stanley, a resort town on Lake Erie. It was the only three-phase traction line in Canada, and was closed in 1918.

== New factory ==
In 1904 the company opened a new factory at a site in East Pilton, Edinburgh, employing 3,000 at its peak in the 1950s. The works had its own internal railway system, which was electrified and used electric shunting locomotives built by Peebles themselves. This was the first electric line in Edinburgh (main line electrification did not reach Edinburgh until the early 1990s). In 1905 the company was exhibiting at the Third International Electric Tramway and Railway Exhibition. It also manufactured at least one (from an order of ten) electric locomotives for the Portmadoc, Beddgelert and South Snowdon Railway.

== War work ==
During both World Wars, the works produced shells, submarine and aircraft parts, tank and electrical equipment such as mobile search lights and minesweeping units.

== Woodhead Line electrification ==
It was the main sub contractor for the electrification of the Woodhead Line between Manchester and Sheffield from 1947–1954, a major engineering achievement. Throughout this period it specialised in large scale transformers for power stations, including the world's largest 400 kV 'quadrature booster' for the UK national grid. It also produced heavy electric motors for various uses, including railway locomotives.

== Ownership changes ==
The company became part of the Reyrolle Parsons in 1969, part of Northern Engineering Industries in 1977 and part of Rolls-Royce plc in 1989.

Many young electrical engineers were taken on by this company, with a special course in electrical engineering being run at the nearby Telford College. They gained skills in highly specialised work, and Peebles' products were exported all over the world. The late Ron Brown, MP for Leith, was employed by the company, as was the late Sir Duncan McDonald who was the chief transformer designer.

== The business divided ==
In 1998 the business was split, with the Peebles Electrical Machine Division (Motors & Generators) being acquired by Pope (Australia) and the Transformer Division going to the Austrian company VA Tech.

=== Transformer division ===
In April 1999 a substantial fire destroyed the main transformer works in East Pilton. The company decided that a replacement factory should be relocated to Leith Docks to better facilitate transfer of the largest transformers onto ships for export. The Pilton site was sold for residential redevelopment. VA Tech closed the Leith factory during 2005 and continued service work only. The entire VA Tech company became part of Siemens that year.

=== Motors & Generators division ===
The motors & generators business relocated to Wood Road in the nearby Rosyth dockyard. Parsons Peebles Motor & Generators was acquired by Clyde Blowers Capital in January 2013. The company is still located in the Royal dockyard Rosyth and continues to manufacture and service specialised motors and generators.
