= Albert (automobile) =

Albert and Gwynne-Albert
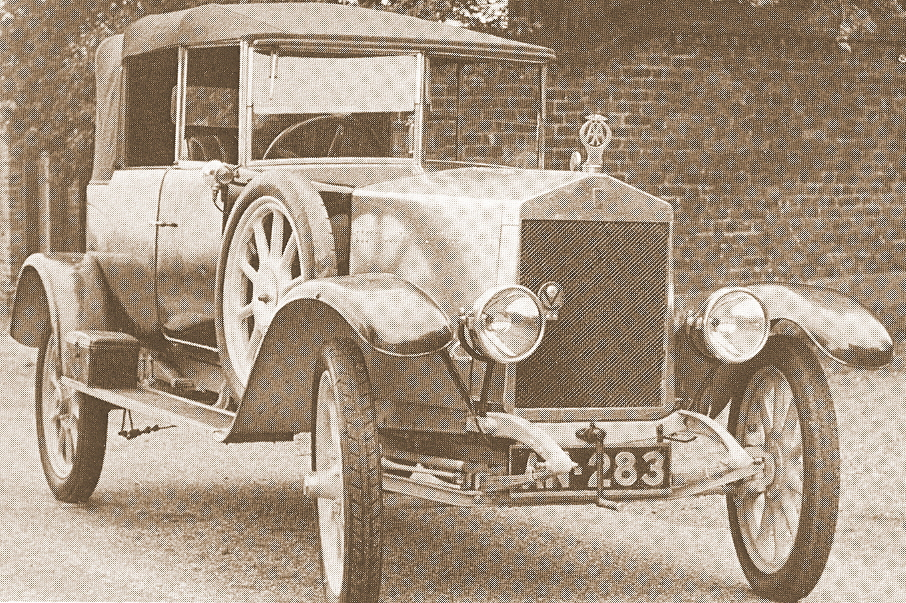
- 1920 Albert 12hp

Overview
- Manufacturer: Adam, Grimaldi & Co., Gwynnes Limited
- Production: 1920–1929; Approx 2000 made
- Designer: A. O. Lord

Body and chassis
- Body style: Tourer, saloon
- Layout: FR layout

Powertrain
- Engine: 1495 or 1944 cc straight four

Dimensions
- Wheelbase: 110 in (2,794 mm) or 114 in (2,896 mm)
- Length: 158 in (4,013 mm)(typical depending on body fitted)
- Width: 67 in (1,702 mm)

The Albert was a light car built by aircraft parts maker Adam, Grimaldi & Company and named after their Albert Embankment address. It was designed by A. O. Lord, creator of the later Loyd-Lord. It was produced from 1920 to 1924 in Vauxhall and later Chiswick, London.

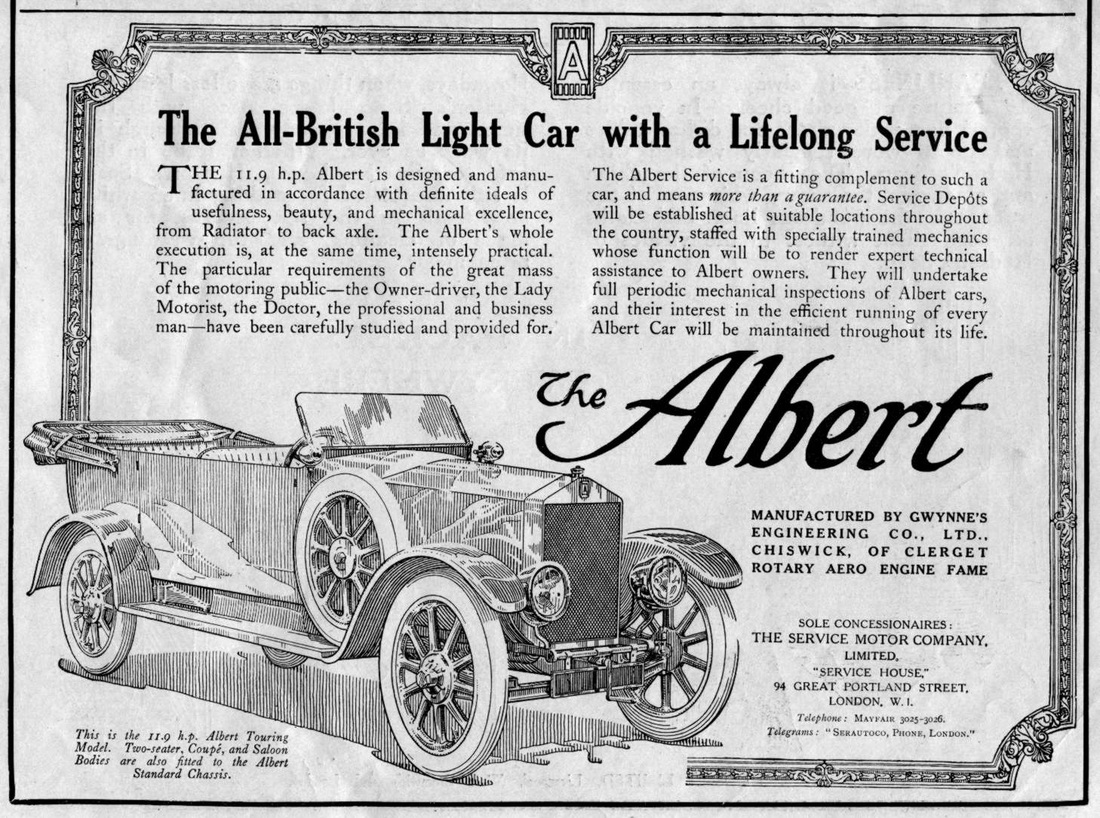
Advert from the Pears' Annual Christmas 1920 cost 2/-

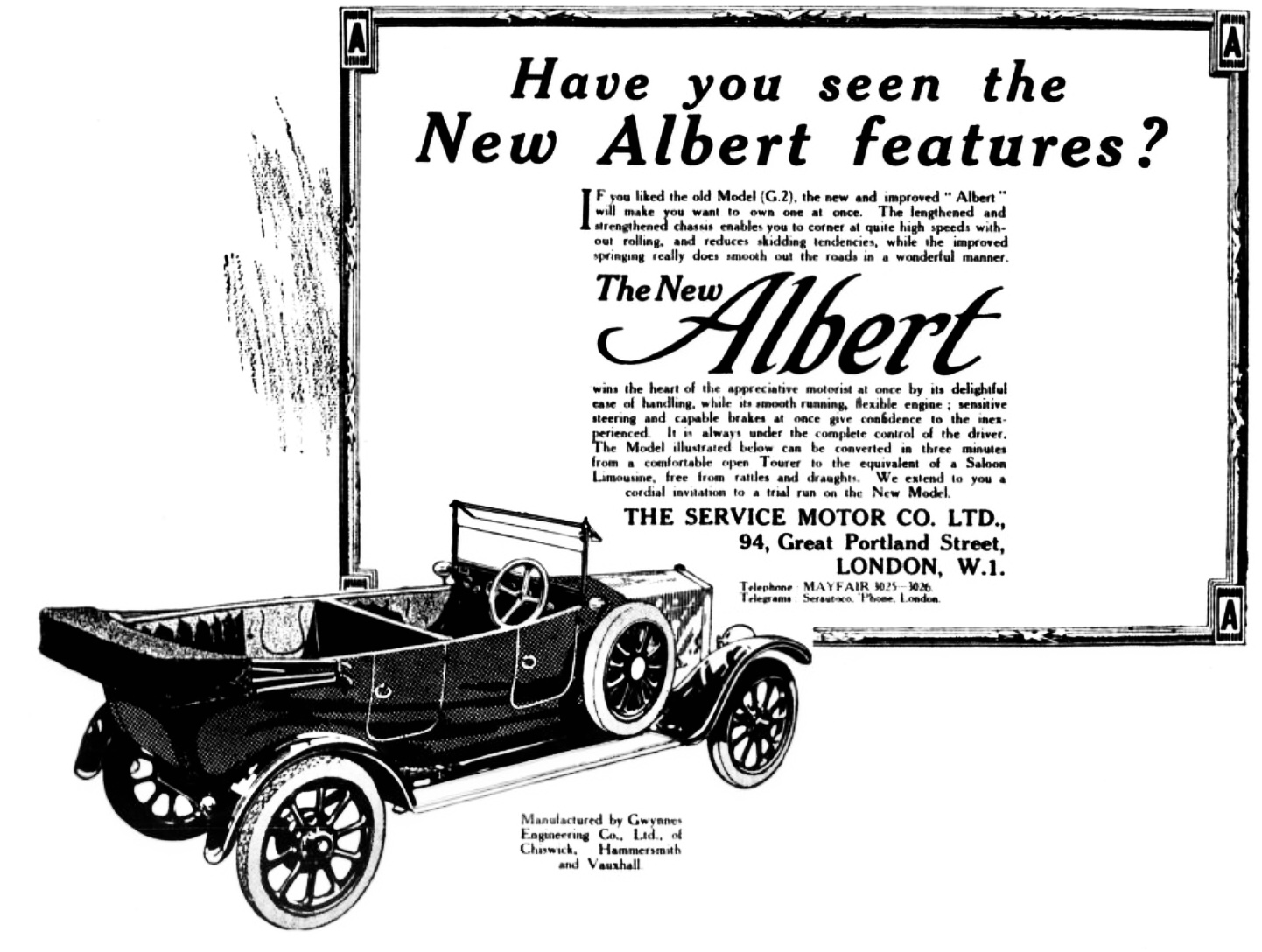
Albert G3 (1919-1924)

The car with a taxation rating of 12HP was powered by a proprietary four-cylinder 1495 cc ohv engine made by Gwynnes Limited and had four-speed transmission driving the rear wheels. The chassis had quarter elliptic springs and brakes were on the rear wheels only. The cars were expensive and boasted a radiator similar to that of the Rolls-Royce. The body was mainly made of aluminium and most were 4-seat tourers.

Adam, Grimaldi & Co., was taken over by Gwynnes Limited of Chiswick in 1920 after about 250 cars were made. Gwynnes moved production to their factory and then made about 1450 more of the original 12HP design.

In 1923 a new model was announced with the engine enlarged to 1944 cc and the name changed to Gwynne-Albert. A plate clutch replaced the previous cone one and the suspension changed to semi-elliptic leaf springs. From 1925 front wheel brakes were fitted. About 200 of the larger-engined cars were built, with the last ones being sold possibly as late as 1929.

The Gwynne 8 model was also available with an Albert style radiator and sold under the Albert name but only around eight are believed to have been sold.

== See also ==
- List of car manufacturers of the United Kingdom
