= Northern Engineering Industries =

Former British engineering firm based in Newcastle upon Tyne

Northern Engineering Industries plc

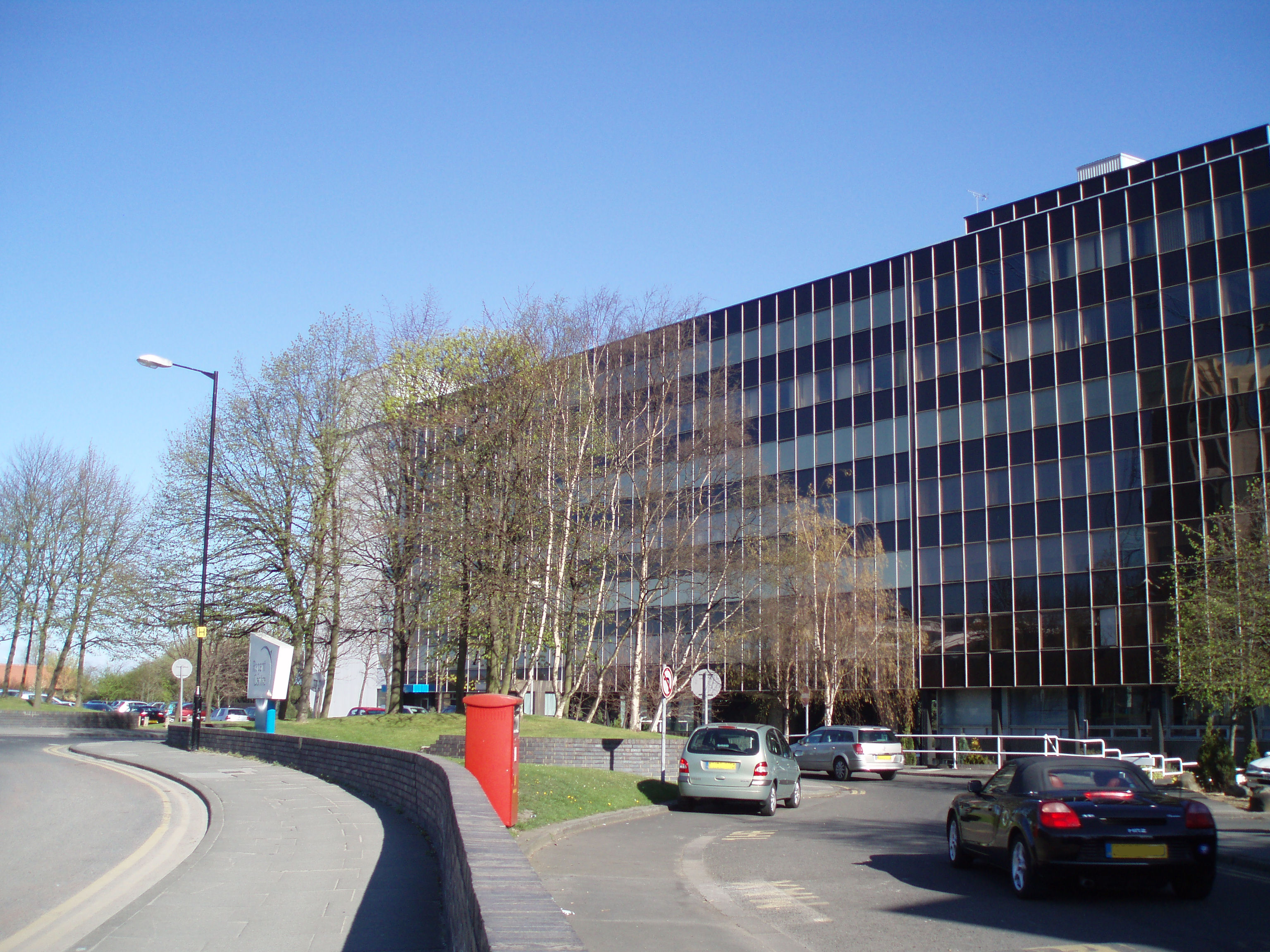
- The former headquarters at Regent Centre, Gosforth
- Type: Public
- Industry: Engineering, Power Generation, Power Transmission, Power Distribution & Material Handling
- Founded: 1977
- Defunct: 1989
- Fate: Acquired
- Successor: Rolls-Royce plc
- Headquarters: Newcastle, England, UK
- Key people: Terry Harrison, (Chairman); Dr Robert Hawley, (Managing Director)
- Products: Industrial Engineering
- Number of employees: 40,000 (1991)

Northern Engineering Industries plc (NEI) was a British engineering firm, which for over 10 years was one of the largest employers on Tyneside. Its headquarters were based at the Regent Centre at Gosforth in Newcastle upon Tyne.

== History ==
The company was established on the initiative of Sir James Woodeson, who had been chairman of Clarke Chapman from 1949 until 1977 and of chairman of Reyrolle Parsons from 1974 to 1977. The companies merged to form Northern Engineering Industries with Woodeson as chairman and chief executive in 1977. It manufactured cranes (Clarke Chapman), transformers (Bruce Peebles & Co. Ltd.), switchgear (A. Reyrolle & Company), boilers (Power Engineering Ltd), control systems (Control and Instrumentation Ltd.), and turbines (C. A. Parsons and Company).

In 1981 the company acquired Amalgamated Power Engineering (APE), a leading manufacturer of engines. APE was itself the result of a merger in 1968 of W.H. Allen, Sons & Co. (founded in 1880 and based in Bedford), Belliss and Morcom of Birmingham, and Crossley Engines (founded in 1867 and based in Manchester).

Northern Engineering Industries was led through much of its existence by Sir Duncan McDonald, first as Group Managing Director (1977 to 1980) and, following Woodeson's death in a car accident in January 1980, as Chairman (1980 to 1986). It was later led by Sir Terence Harrison first as Chief Executive (1983 to 1986) and then as Chairman (1986 to 1989).

The company was acquired by Rolls-Royce plc in 1989, subsequently being rebranded as Rolls-Royce Industrial Power Group.

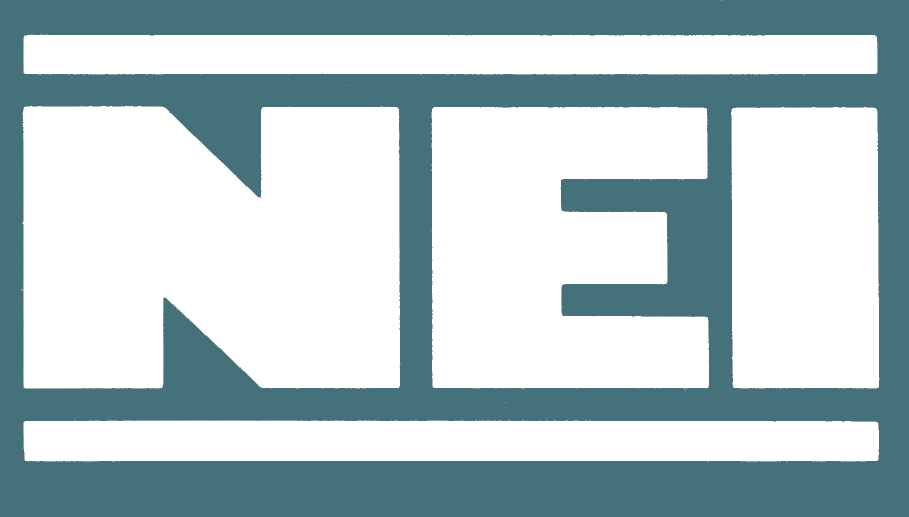
NEI coloured logo (scanned)

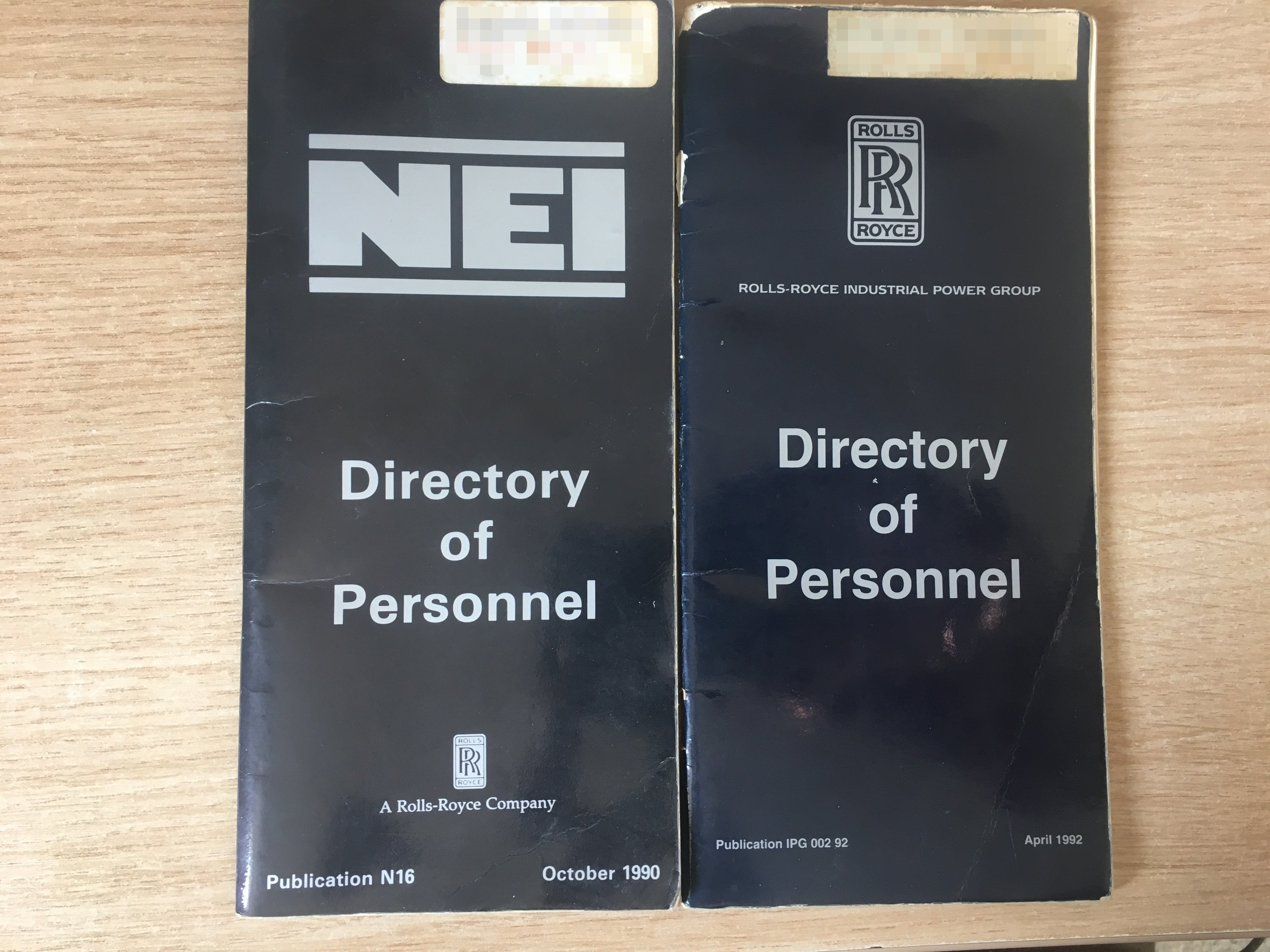
Directory of Personnel showing front cover

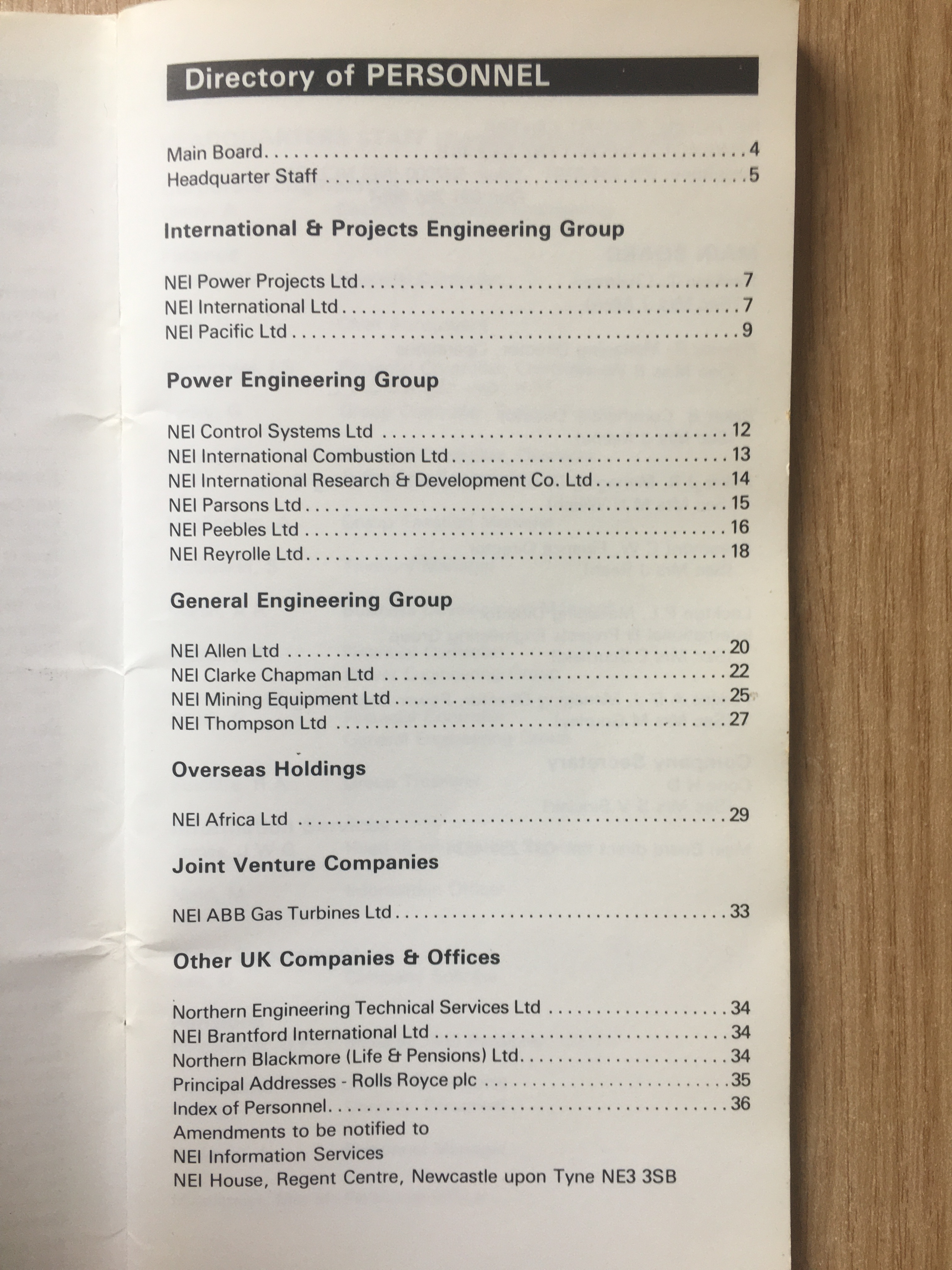
Directory of Personnel showing main business structures

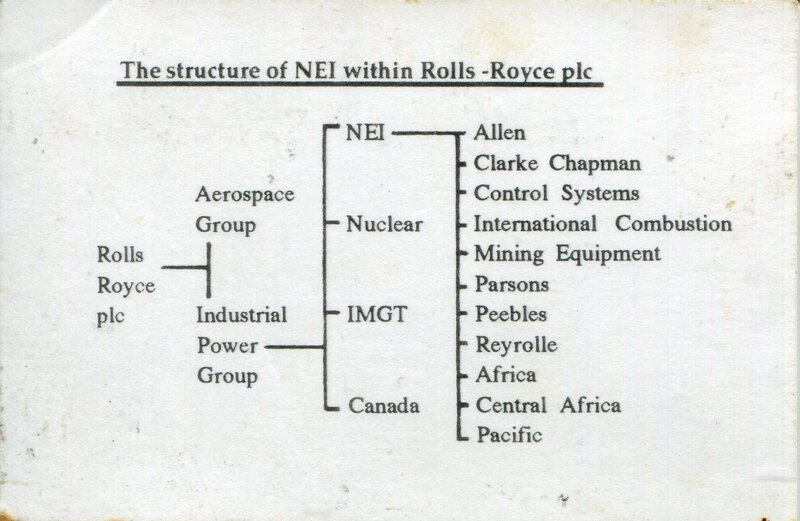
1992 NEI within Rolls-Royce IPG structure
