= William Tritton =

British engineer and inventor (1875-1946)

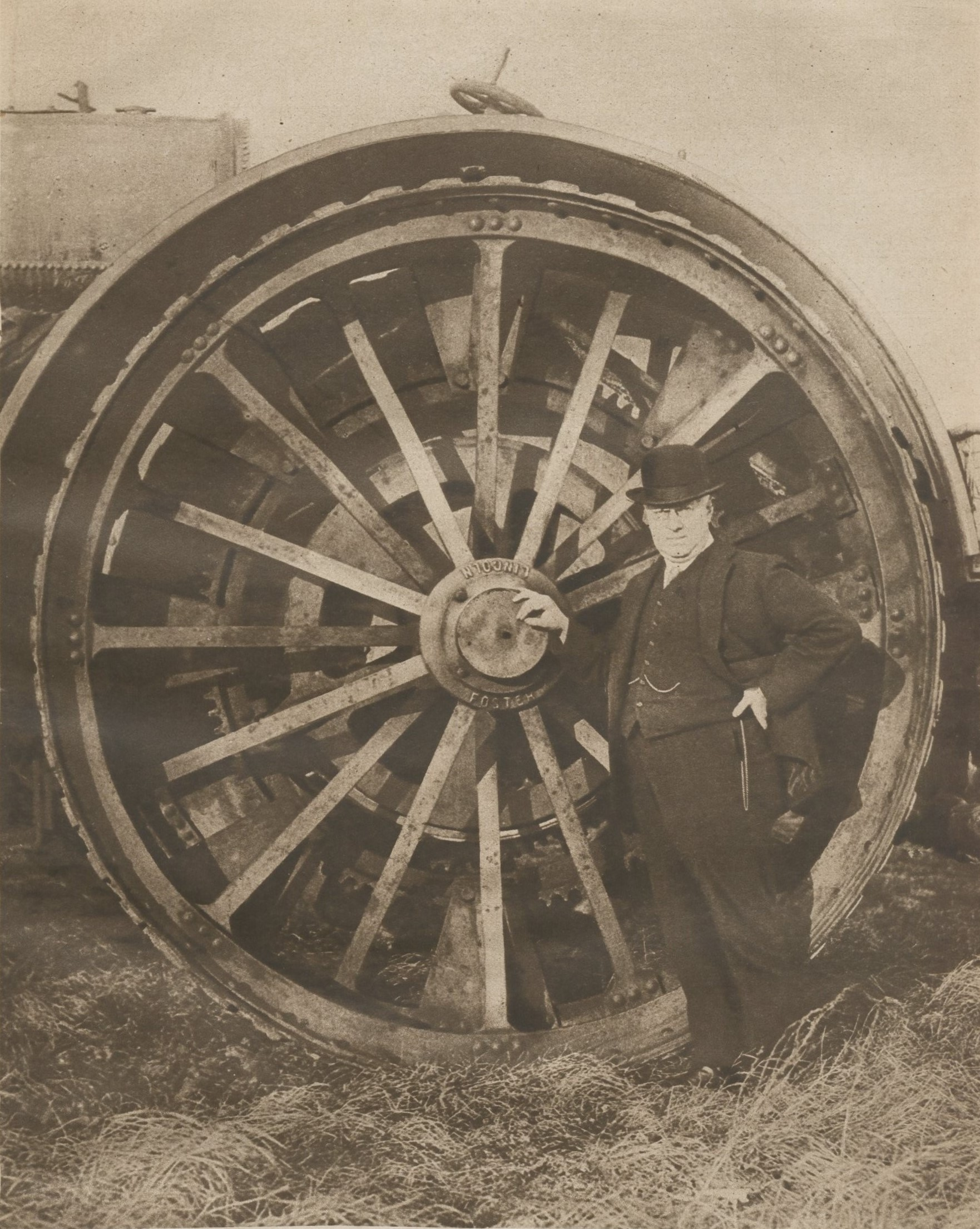
William Tritton next to the Foster agricultural machine (French magazine Le Miroir, December 1917)

Sir William Ashbee Tritton, JP, (19 June 1875 – 24 September 1946) was a British expert in agricultural machinery, and was directly involved, together with Major Walter Gordon Wilson in the development of the tank. Early in World War I he was asked to produce tractors for moving heavy howitzers, the result being eventually the first tanks.

== Early life ==
His grandparents, William Tritton (1810-1875) and Sally Weston Birch (1812-1877) married on 13 March 1844 in Tenterden. Other grandparents were Mary Ann, born in Ospringe, his mother's mother, died aged 57, on 21 December 1869. Henry died 22 July 1874. The property was inherited by Ellen's brother John K Ashbee.

At Boughton under Blean parish church, on 22 October 1873, his parents William Birch Tritton of Huntley Lodge on Carleton Road, in Tufnell Park West, married Ellen Hannah Ashbee, daughter of Henry and Mary Ann Ashbee, of Colkins of 140 acres, in the village. Next to the Clock House Crossing of the Chatham Main Line, close to junction 7, the eastern end, of the M2, known as 'Brenley Corner'.

In 1910, Frederick Gilbert Tritton lived at 91 Church Road, near St George's Church. The Ashbee family had lived in the village for many decades. Colkins had apple orchards.

His brother was born on 8 August 1878. His brother also went to the same school.

Tritton was born at Huntley Lodge in Islington, where his father William Birch Tritton (1845, Hythe, Kent – 29 July 1918) and mother Ellen Hannah Ashbee (16 December 1847 – 19 April 1921) lived at 51 Carleton Road.

His brother was Percy Kingsnorth Tritton (1878–1903). He was the son of a London stockbroker, educated at Christ's College, Finchley and King's College London. By 1901 he was living in Altrincham.

== Career ==
He joined Gwynnes Pumps in 1891. He later became a linotype mechanic and an electrical engineer.

In 1906 he joined William Foster & Co. on Waterloo Street in Lincoln, and from 1911 until 1939 he was managing director of the company, after which he became chairman. On 22 July 1915, it was decided on the proposal for the tank – 28 tons, to cross a trench four feet wide.

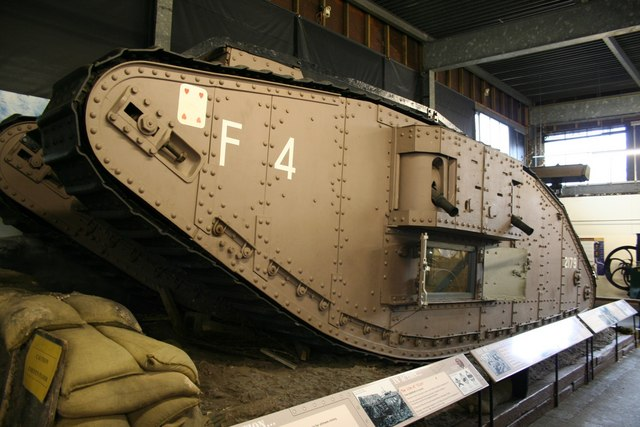
A Fosters' 1917 Mark IV tank at the Museum of Lincolnshire Life in January 2007, which saw action at the Battle of Cambrai (1917)

The tank was developed at Foster's Wellington Works on Firth Road and tested on a field south of the Lincoln Avoiding Line, a railway line that closed in 1985. The site of Foster's was demolished in 1984. He was the production engineer for the tank at Fosters. He had the idea of shifting the tank's centre of gravity with the rear wheels. Major Ernest Swinton and Major Walter Dally Jones thought up the name tank.

The construction of the first tank at Fosters began on 11 August 1915. World War I tanks were also built by Metro-Cammell of Washwood Heath and a number of other contractors. Foster's was, at the time, the only company in the UK to commercially make caterpillar-tracked vehicles.

== Personal life ==
In 1916 he married Isabella White Gillies, daughter of Graham Gillies of Perth, in Willesden.

He was knighted on 21 February 1917. He was a JP in Kesteven from 1934. He died in Lincoln aged 71 in September 1946. His wife died in Lincoln on 15 November 1950. He had lived on Eastcliff Road, Lincoln.

On the night of 4 June 1934, their house at 'Cliff Dean', 2 Eastcliff Road, was burgled by George Alec Taylor Beaumont, of Swan Street, a fitter's mate. A description was given of the burglar, and when walking down Clasketgate on 8 June 1934, Detective Sergeant William Bradshaw of Lincoln City Police saw a man who fitted the description, followed him, and arrested him as he was to enter his home. Mr Beaumont denied the burglary, but when searched at the Central Police Station, two watches of Sir William Tritton were found, and Beaumont confessed 'I admit I did it. You have got the right man'. 36 year old Beaumont had stolen items valued at £90. Beaumont had burgled five properties over five months, including the offices of Lincoln Girls' High School, and on Saturday 23 June 1934, Beaumont was sentenced to nine months hard labour by John Pritchett.

He had been in Lindum Nursing Home, where he died.

=== Death ===
He died in the afternoon. He was cremated in Nottingham on the afternoon of Friday 27 September. At the ceremony was Philip Race, the solicitor brother of broadcaster Steve Race, and Methodist preacher. His wife died on Wednesday 15 November 1950, aged 64, in Bromhead Nursing Home. She lived at 94 Yarborough Road (B1273), from December 1947. She left £24,774.

Tritton Road in Lincoln is named after him and a blue plaque is located at the entrance of a supermarket at the northern end of the road around the site of the original factories.

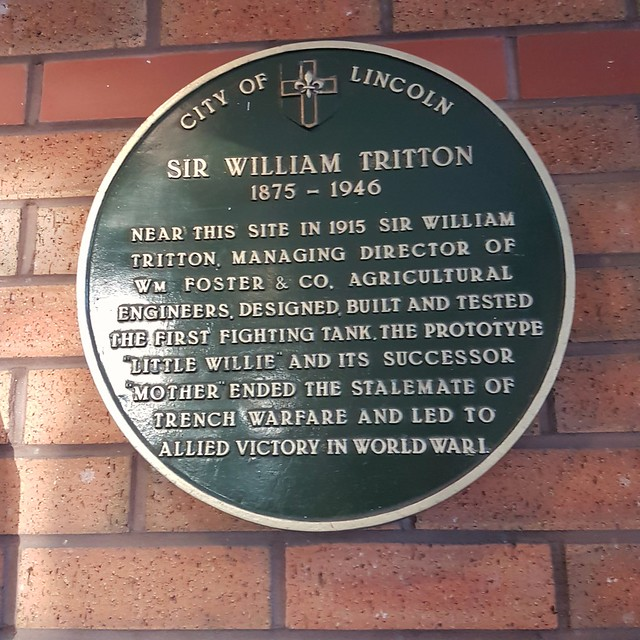
Blue plaque named after Sir William Ashbee Tritton at Tritton Road, Lincoln

Business positions
Preceded by	Managing Director of William Foster & Co. 1911 - 1939	Succeeded by
