= Duncan McDonald (electrical engineer) =

Scottish engineer and businessman

Sir Duncan McDonald CBE FRSE FIEE FRSA (20 September 1921 – 23 February 1997) was a Scottish engineer and businessman closely associated with Northern Engineering Industries. He specialised in the development of ultra high voltage transformers. He pioneered the use of computers within the design process, and was one of the first to realise the potential of the Pacific Rim in business.

== Life ==
He was born in Inverkeithing, under the shadow of the Forth Rail Bridge, the son of Robert McDonald, a cable-jointer with the South of Scotland Electricity Board, and his wife, Helen Orrick. He was raised in Inverkeithing then attended Dunfermline High School. He then went to Edinburgh University graduating in Electrical Power Engineering in 1942.

His first job was with British Thomson-Houston in Rugby, working (during the Second World War) on radar research. In 1952 he developed Britain's first 275,000 volt transformer for the National Grid. In 1954 he returned to Scotland to join Bruce Peebles & Co. Ltd. (later Parsons Peebles) as their chief transformer designer. By 1962 he was managing director of the company. Through company amalgamations he became Chief Executive of Reyrolle Parsons and from there Chief Executive of Northern Engineering Industries.

In 1969 he was elected a Fellow of the Royal Society of Edinburgh. His proposers were Sir John Toothill, William E J Farvis and Oppenshaw Taylor.

He received honorary doctorates from both Heriot-Watt University and Newcastle University. In 1983 he was made a Commander of the Order of the British Empire for services to British Exports and knighted by Queen Elizabeth II. In later life he was a non-executive director of both General Accident and the Northern Rock Building Society.

He retired in May 1986 and died in Edinburgh on 23 February 1997.

== Family ==
In 1955 he married Jane Anne Guckian. They had three sons and a daughter.
