= Gwynnes Limited =

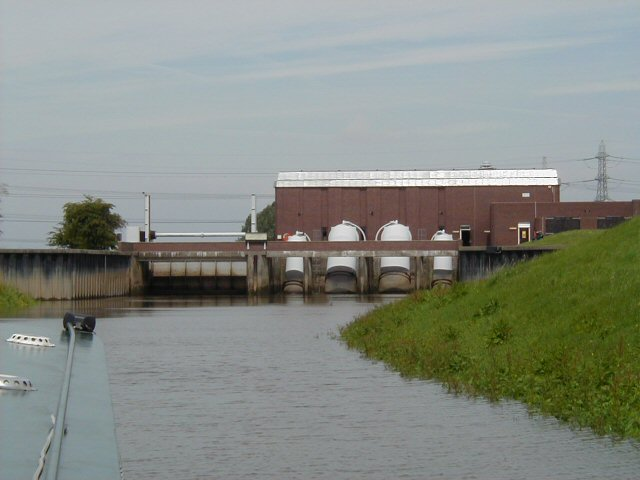
Wallasey Dock impounding station 1982

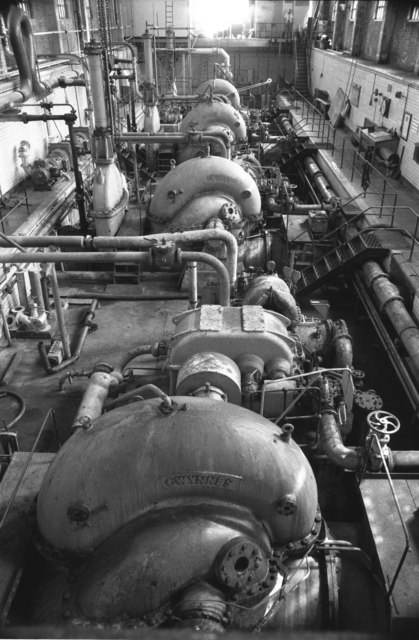
Four centrifugal pumps by Gwynnes Misterton Soss on the River Idle, Yorkshire

Gwynnes Limited was a City of London England engineering business, iron founders and pump makers founded in 1849 to capitalise on the centrifugal pump invented (Note: The first practical centrifugal pump called the Massachusetts pump was built in the United States in 1818. In 1830 a pump having a fairly good efficiency was built by McCarty at the dock yards of New York. About 1846 centrifugal pumps began to be manufactured in England by Appold Thompson and Gwynne. Appold improved the pump by the addition of curved vanes in 1849. (page 10, R L Daugherty (prof. Hydraulics, Cornell U.) '’Centrifugal Pumps'’, McGraw-Hill, New York 1915) John Gwynne bought Andrews USA 1846 patent and introduced it to England. Lloyd took out a fan patent in 1848 and J G Appold began the manufacture of almost the same fan. John Gwynne did not trouble to patent various improvements but applied for a new patent in 1850 though the patent agent made a mistake and the patent is dated 1851. In 1854 J E A Gwynne obtained a patent for an improved form of Gwynne pump In 1868 J and H Gwynne secured a patent for an improved centrifugal pump P R Bjorling, '’Pumps, Historically, Theoretically and Practically Considered'’, Spon, London 1895) by James Gwynne (1804–1850). (Note: James Gwynne (1804–1850) All his children were born in Bushmills, co. Antrim. His eldest son— James Eglinton Anderson Gwynne (1832–1915) who was only 17 when his father died, became the largest landowner in East Sussex and James's second son— Nevile Gwynne (1869–1951) was managing director in 1920. Notable descendants include: Elizabeth David Violet Gordon-Woodhouse Rupert Gwynne Roland Gwynne) In 1856 his eldest son, James Eglinton Anderson Gwynne (1832–1915), of Essex Street Wharves on the south side of The Strand was awarded a patent for the manufacture of carbon or charcoal powder. Their Strand site became part of the Victoria Embankment built between 1865 and 1867 and Gwynne profited from judicious investment in the reclaimed land. Their Crisp Road, Hammersmith Ironworks and works at Church Wharf, Chiswick, London, were established in 1867 to specialise in the manufacture of these centrifugal pumps and pumping engines This machinery was for use in practically all purposes where large or small quantities of liquid were required to be lifted and dealt with for low or high heads. A limited liability company was formed in May 1897 to own the business.

They made cars between 1920 and 1929. Following their 1919 agreement to purchase the Albert car business, Adam Grimaldi & Co Limited, a new holding company was formed and named Gwynnes Engineering Company Limited. Their share issue did not attract the expected support from investors and the car venture failed, hampered by lack of capital.

After the company was dissolved in 1927 the pump-making business continued under the ownership of Gwynnes Pumps Limited which belonged to Fosters of Lincoln. Subsequent ownership was: W H Allen Sons & Company, Vickers then Amalgamated Power Engineering of Bedford before Gwynnes' separate identity disappeared in the 1970s.

== Invincible pumps ==
Gwynnes was founded in 1849 to make their Invincible centrifugal pumps in sizes from small to as large as, for example, the three pumps for the large graving dock of the Bombay Port Trust which together moved 8,500,000 gallons of water per hour. In 1910 they were reported to employ about 400 men in the Hammersmith works when new Battleships and Cruiser battleships were fitted with their hydraulic ejectors and bilge, sanitary, fresh water, fire and other pumps. Their pump engines were used for salvage work and dredging among many other purposes.

They also provided supplementary equipment such as their eight-horsepower fire engine. The Gwynnes Eight vehicle range included a light fire engine equipped with Gwynnes' own pumps. Two examples are preserved. One was built in 1922 for the Marconi Company's factory fire brigade and is now at Coventry Museum of Transport. The other was stationed at East Raynham in Norfolk and is now at Holkham Hall.

== Clerget aero engines ==
During the First World War Gwynnes workshops made Clerget and Bentley BR2 rotary aircraft engines.

== Cars ==
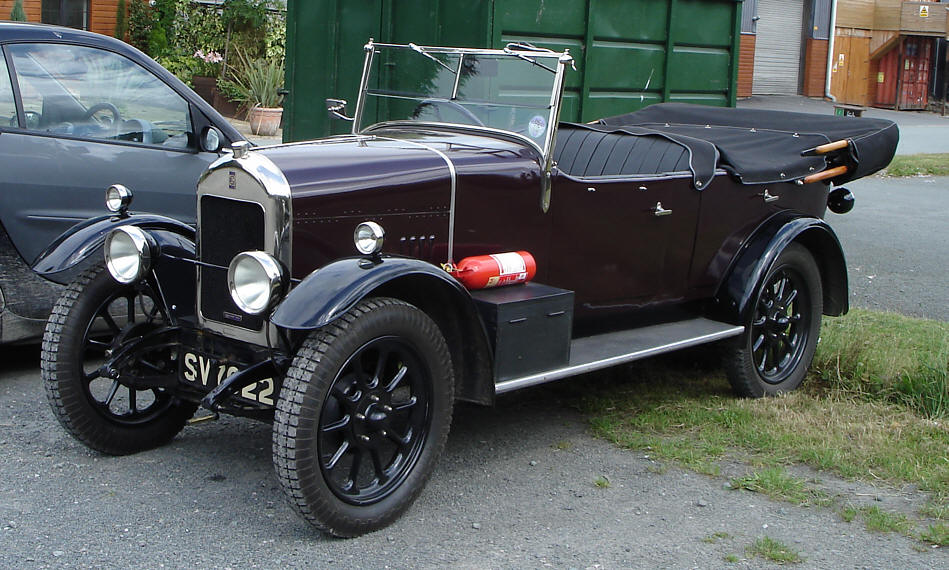
1929 Gwynne 10 hp

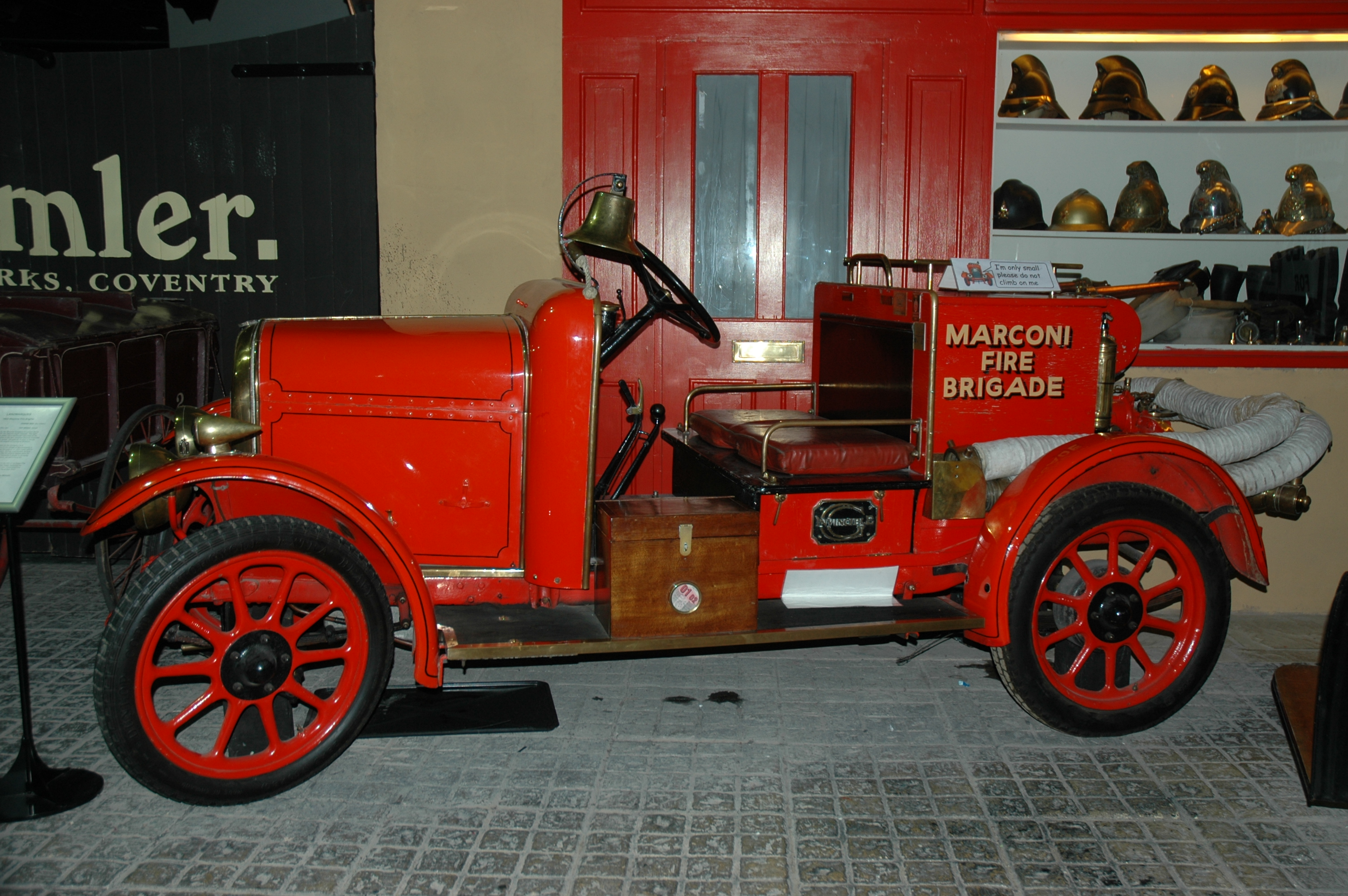
Gwynne 8 light fire engine

On 1 January 1920 Gwynnes bought the limited liability company, Adam, Grimaldi & Co Limited, who made cars under the Albert name, with their freehold Albert Works on the Albert Embankment at Glasshouse Street Vauxhall SE13. They took W F Adam MIMechE MIAE with them to manage the bodybuilding and moved production to Gwynnes' Chiswick works now at the end of Pumping Station Road. In 1923 the name of the car was changed to Gwynne-Albert and the engine enlarged to 14 hp.

In 1922 Gwynnes Limited started to make a small car, the Gwynne Eight, based on the design of the Spanish Victoria car. This had a 950 cc 4-cylinder overhead valve engine producing 24 bhp. Financial problems arose in 1923 and a receiver was appointed, but production continued. About 2,250 examples of the Eight were made.

A larger model of car, the Gwynne Ten, was offered from 1927. About 600 were made before production ceased.

== Receivership ==
A receiver and manager was appointed in July 1923. The company was compulsorily wound up by the Official Receiver in 1927. The Hammersmith Borough Council bought the former Gwynnes Wharf.

== Gwynnes Pumps Limited ==
Gwynnes Pumps Limited was formed in early 1927 to acquire the business and assets of Gwynnes Engineering Company Limited It was part of the Fosters of Lincoln group, William Foster & Company Limited, which itself became a subsidiary of W H Allen Sons & Co Limited in 1961. By this time, 1961, Gwynnes products still remained in demand all over the world in their various sizes from Nuclear Power Stations, oil refineries, dry docks, dredges down to coal mines and pumps for many other materials as well as liquids.

== Notes ==
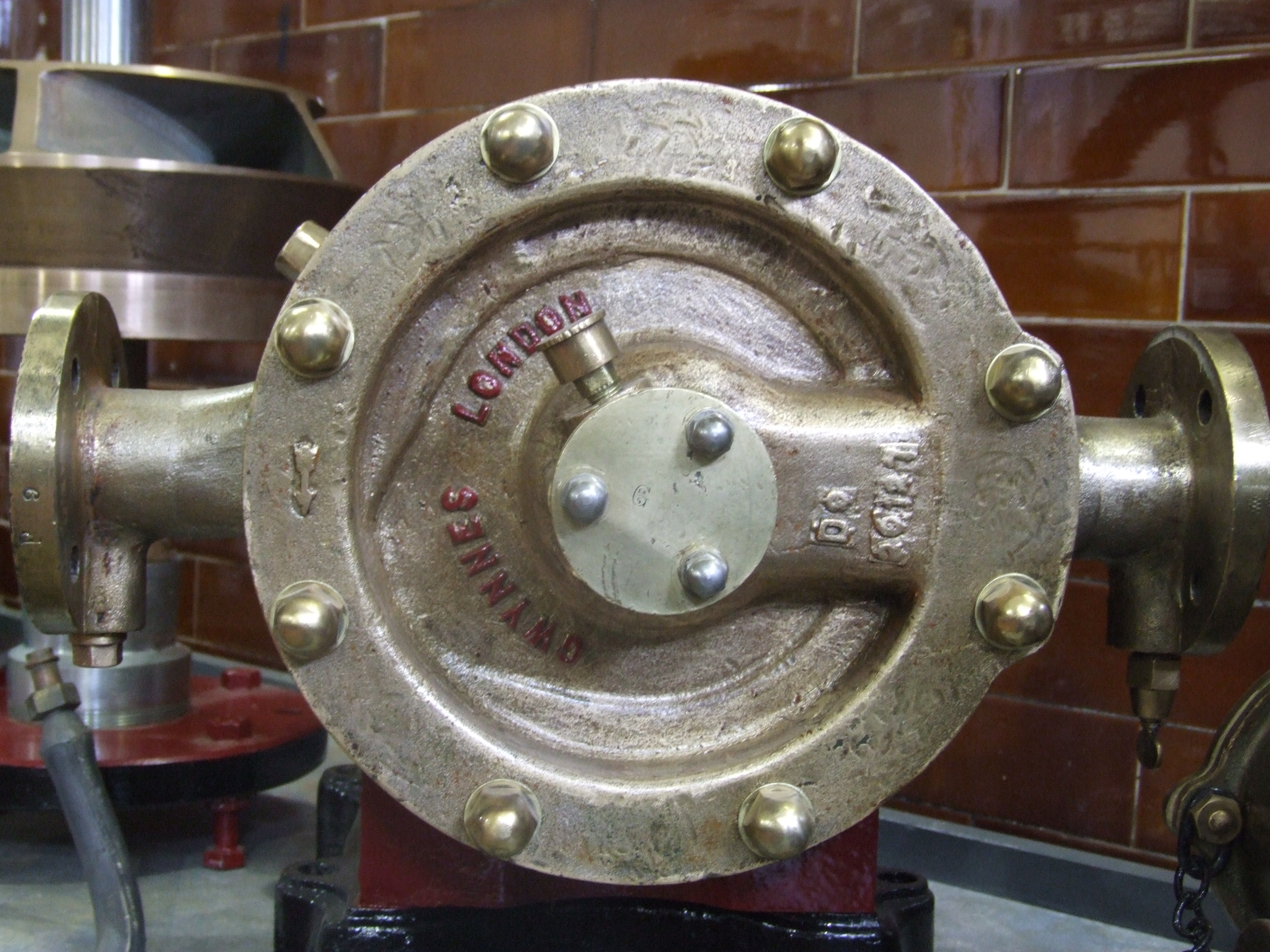
Brede Waterworks

== See also ==
- List of car manufacturers of the United Kingdom
