= BL 15-inch howitzer =

Heavy siege howitzer used during World War I

BL 15-inch howitzer Mk I
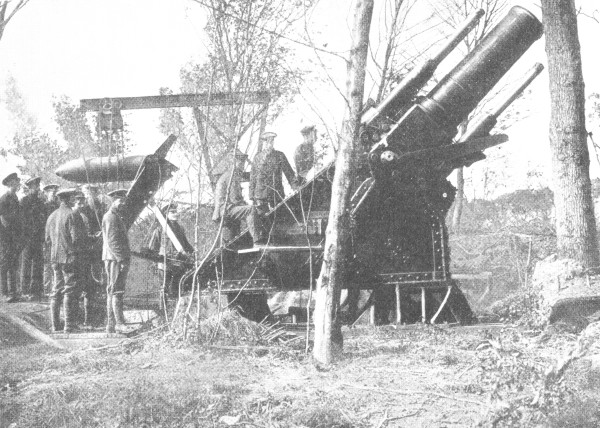
- In action at Englebelmer Wood, Somme, 7 August 1916
- Type: Heavy siege howitzer
- Place of origin: United Kingdom

Service history
- In service: 1915–1918
- Used by: British Empire
- Wars: World War I

Production history
- Designer: Coventry Ordnance Works
- Designed: 1914
- Manufacturer: Coventry Ordnance Works
- No. built: 12
- Variants: Mk I

Specifications
- Mass: 94 tons
- Shell: HE 1,450 lb (658 kg)
- Calibre: 15 inches (381.0 mm)
- Breech: Welin interrupted screw
- Recoil: Hydro-spring 31 inches (790 mm) constant
- Carriage: siege carriage
- Muzzle velocity: 1,117 ft/s (340 m/s)
- Maximum firing range: 10,800 yd (9,900 m)

The Ordnance BL 15-inch howitzer was developed by the Coventry Ordnance Works late in 1914 in response to the success of its design of the 9.2-inch siege howitzer.

The howitzer was cumbersome to deploy, since it was transported in several sections by giant Foster-Daimler tractors.

== Service history ==
The weapon was operated by Royal Marine Artillery detachments of the Naval Brigade, with one gun per battery. One gun was sent to Gallipoli but not used there. They were later transferred to the British Army. It was used at the Battle of the Somme in September 1916 and at the Battle of Passchendaele, also known as the Third Battle of Ypres, in October 1917.

It operated successfully where it was needed to destroy deep fortifications on the Western Front, but was limited by its relatively short range compared to other modern siege howitzers. The size and weight made it difficult to move and emplace. No further development occurred after the first batch of twelve, and instead Britain continued to develop and produce the 12-inch howitzer and 12-inch railway howitzer.

== Image gallery ==
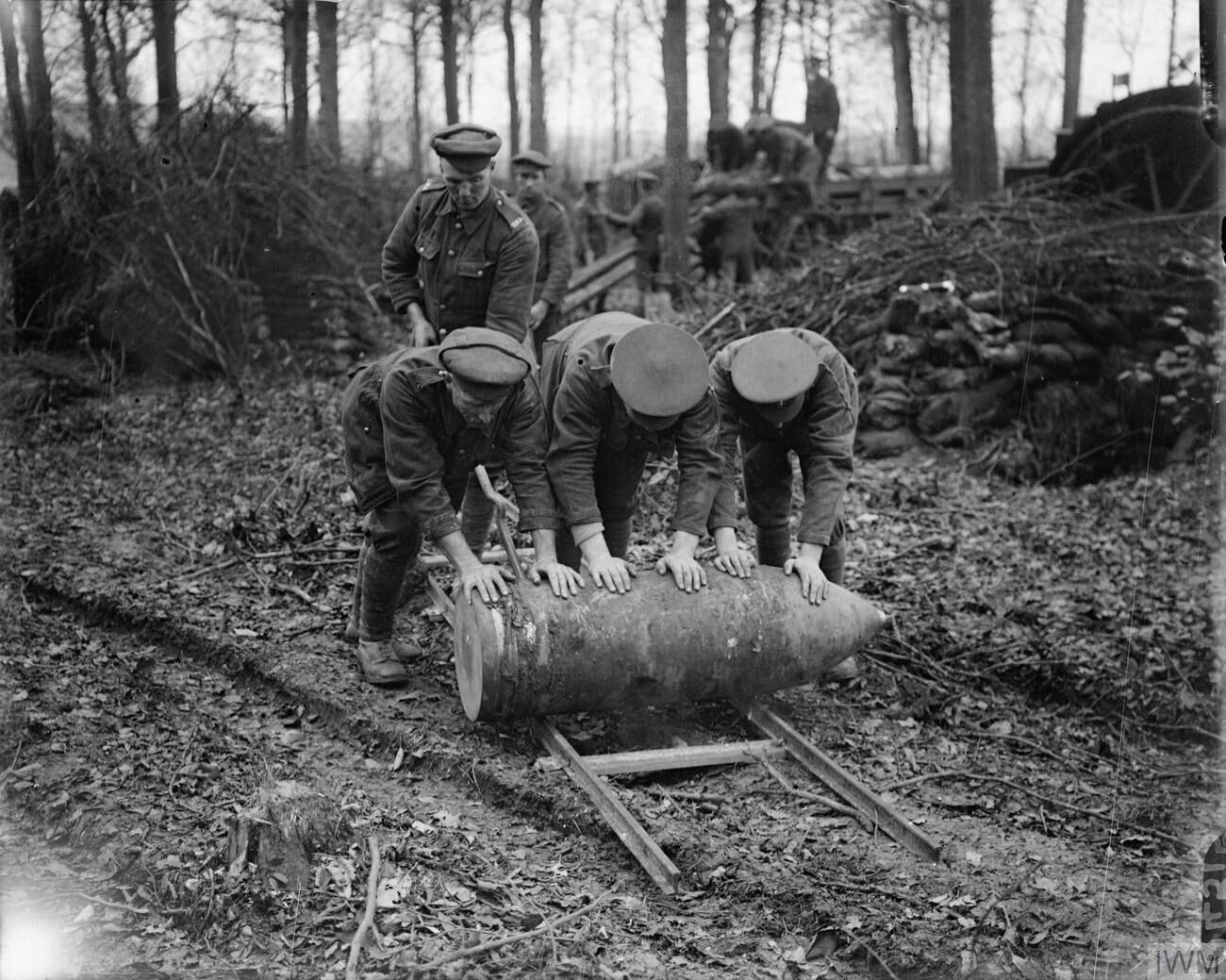
Rolling shell along rails, Englebelmer Wood, Battle of the Somme, September 1916

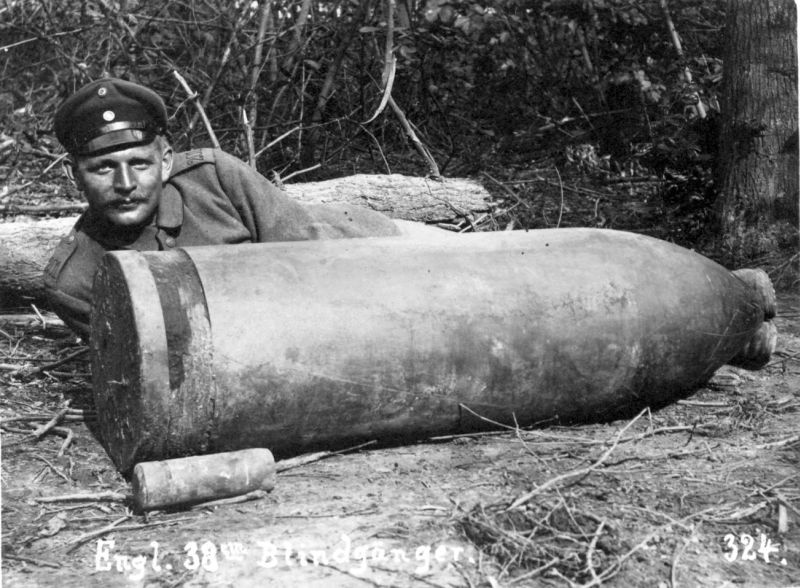
German soldier posing with unexploded shell

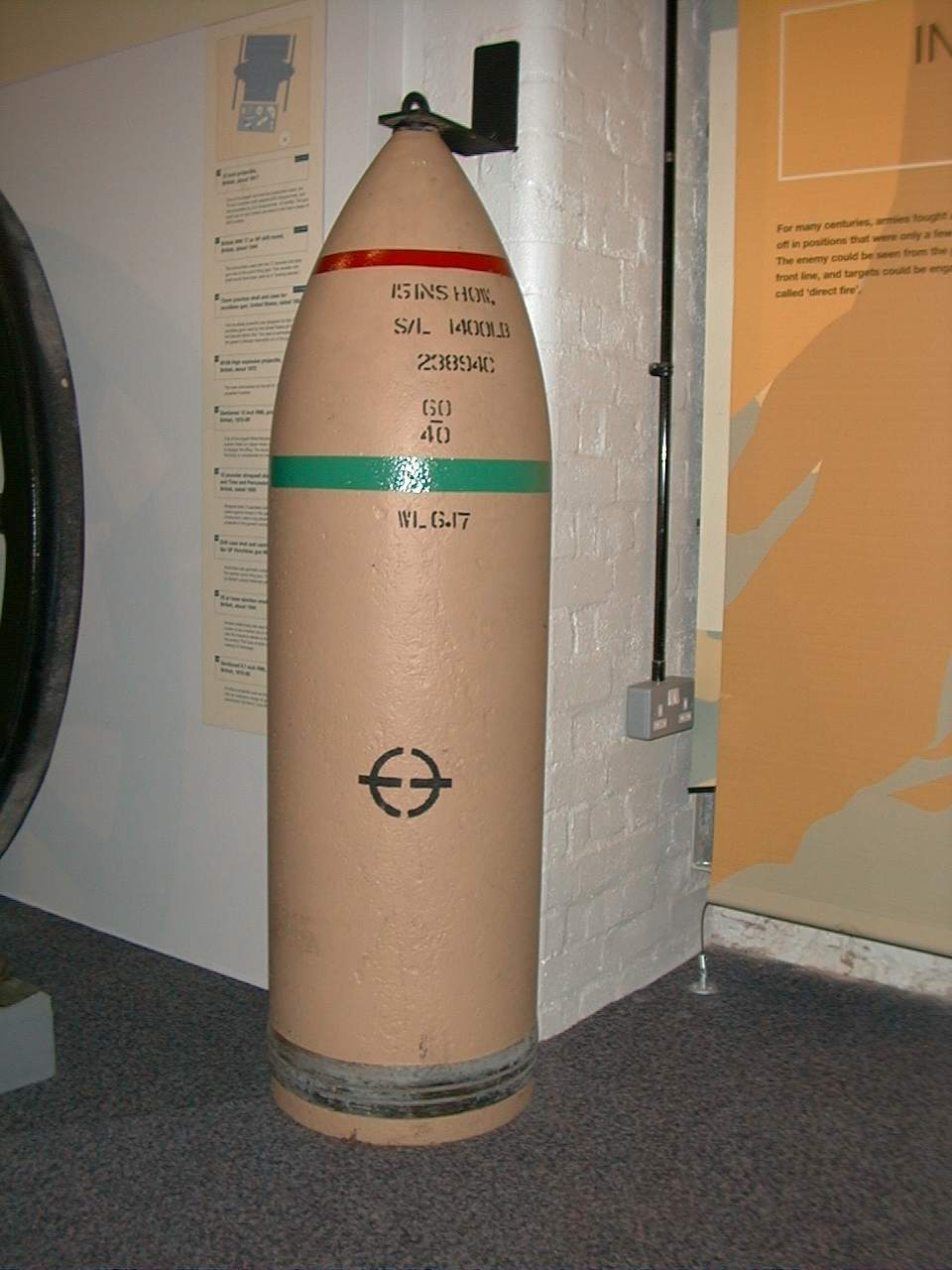
Shell at Royal Artillery Museum, Woolwich, London

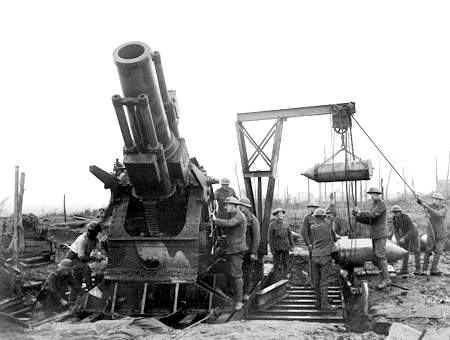
"Granny" in action during the Third Battle of Ypres, 4 October 1917

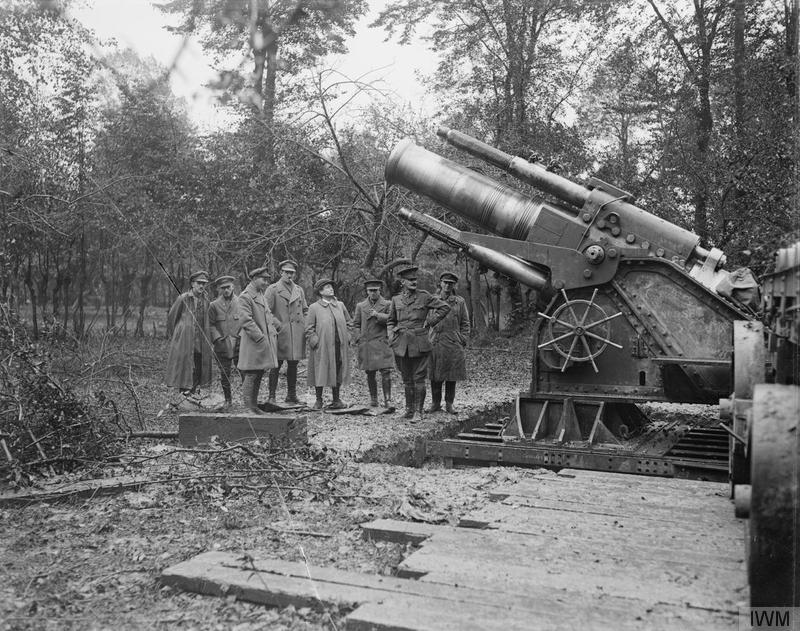
Howitzer inspected by a British delegation in 1916

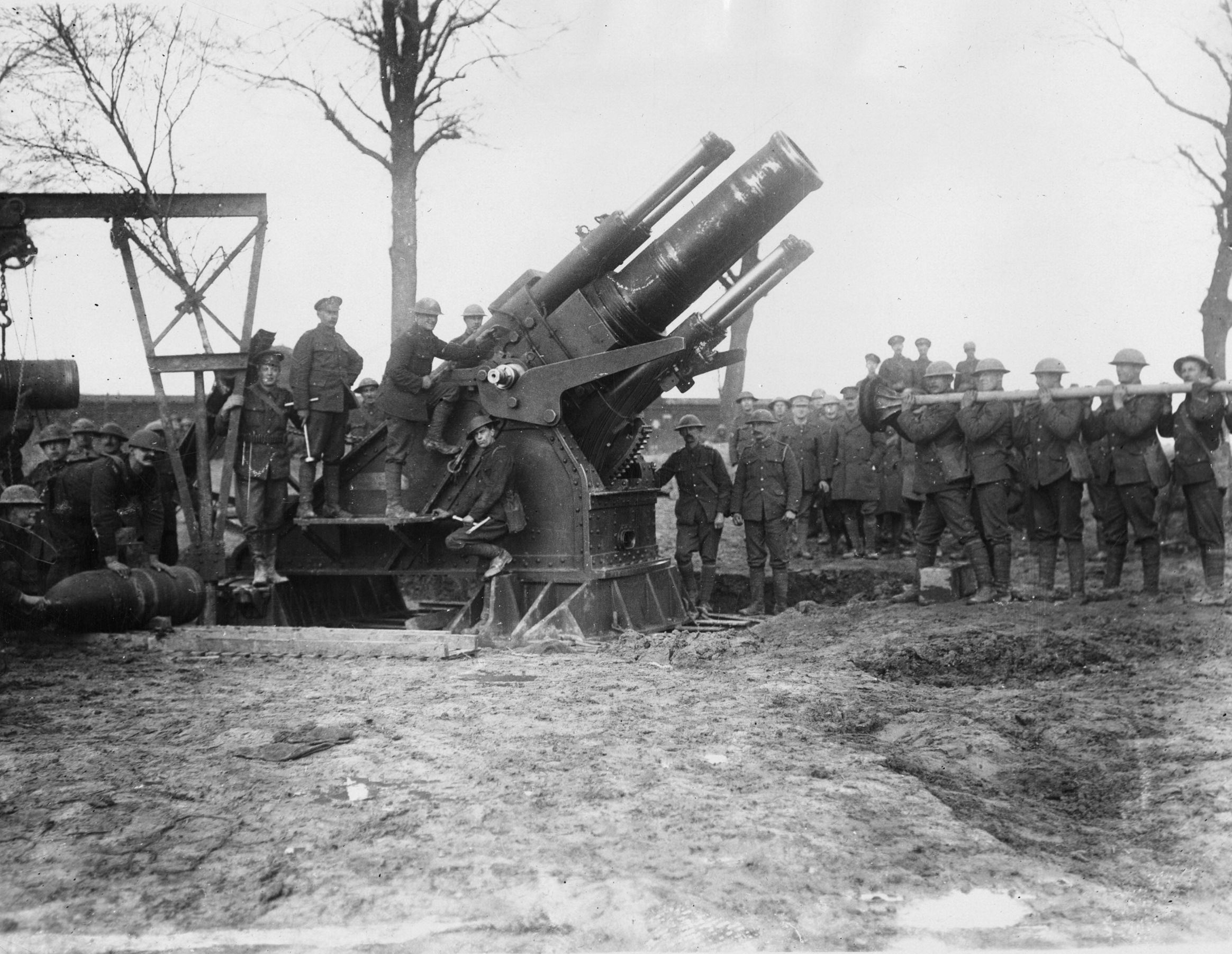
A 15-inch Howitzer being set up

== See also ==
- List of siege artillery

=== Weapons of comparable role, performance and era ===
- Škoda 380 mm Model 1916 howitzer Austro-Hungarian equivalent

== Bibliography ==
- Dale Clarke, British Artillery 1914–1919. Heavy Artillery. Osprey Publishing, Oxford UK, 2005
- I.V. Hogg & L.F. Thurston, British Artillery Weapons & Ammunition 1914–1918. London: Ian Allan, 1972. ISBN 978-0-7110-0381-1
- Winston S. Churchill. The World Crisis, Part 2, 1915. (New York: Rosetta Books, 2013), Kindle.
- Film clip showing Royal Marine Artillery crew loading and firing the howitzer during the Battle of the Somme
- BL 15 inch Siege Howitzer at Landships
