= W. H. Allen, Sons & Company Ltd. =

British engineering firm

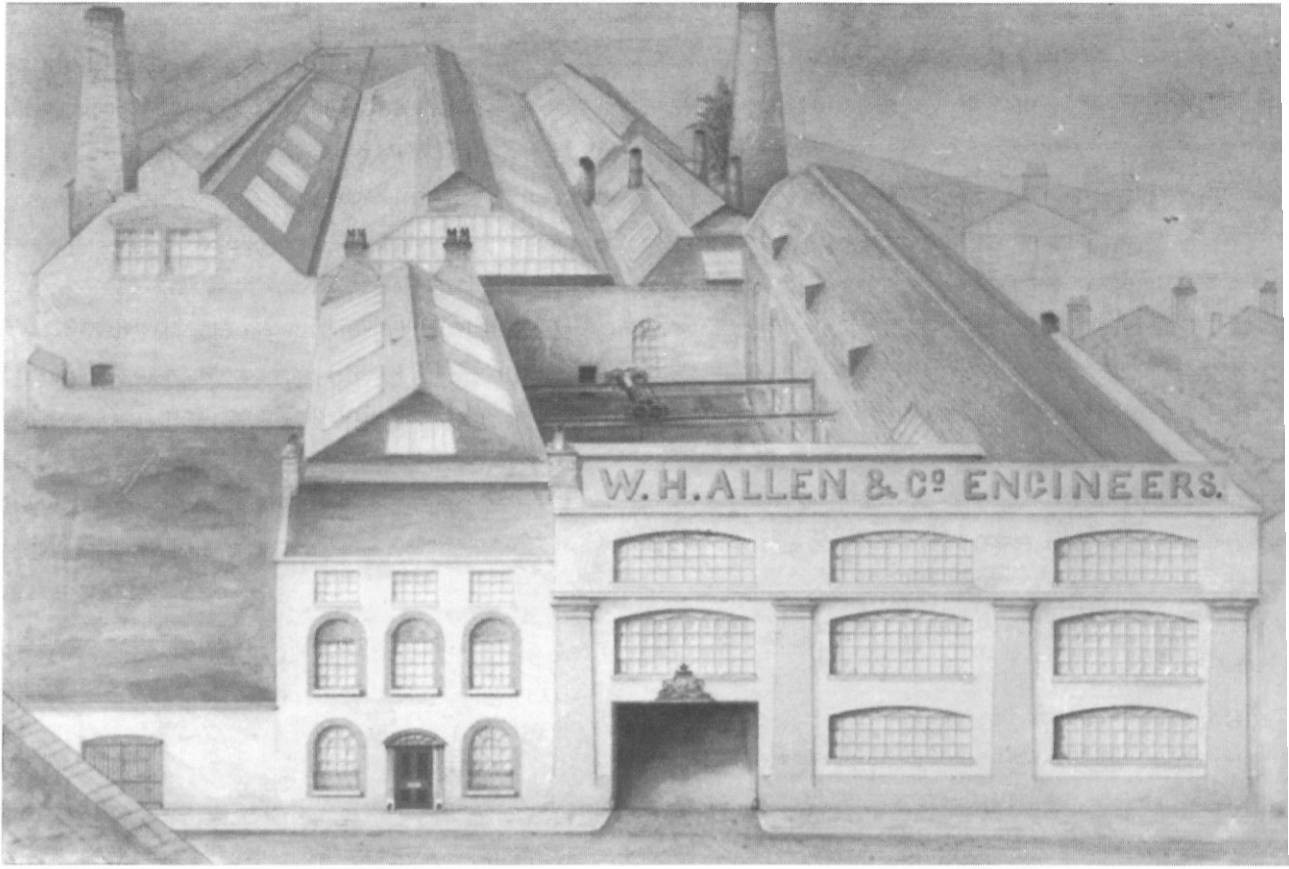
W. H. Allen Co. Original York Street, Lambeth Works in 1880

The Company, initially known as W. H. Allen & Co was founded in 1880 by William Henry Allen as a manufacturer of centrifugal pumps and steam engines in York Street, Lambeth, London. Electric light generating machinery followed with the support of Gisbert Kapp. The firm also supplied marine auxiliary equipment for both the Royal Navy and Mercantile Marine.

In 1889 William Henry Allen's son Richard (later to be Sir Richard Allen) was taken into partnership. The Company moved to a green field site at Queens Park, Bedford in 1894 and the name was changed to W. H. Allen Son and Company. In 1900 the business was incorporated as a limited company.

Steam turbine production and diesel engine manufacture for driving pumps and electrical generators commenced in 1908. In 1909, the firm received an order from Lord Pirrie, the chairman of Harland & Wolff for eight 400kW electrical generating sets. These comprised three-cylinder totally enclosed compound engines driving Allen dynamos and were installed on the White Star Liners, RMS Olympic and RMS Titanic.

During the First World War the Company manufactured under license 80 hp Le Rhône Gnome rotary engines. In 1917 the output was increased to 110 hp known as Le Rhône 9J engines. The rotary engines were used in the Airco DH5, the Sopwith Scout, the Bristol Scout and the Avro.

In 1920 the name was changed to W. H. Allen Sons & Company Ltd upon the appointment of two more of William Henry Allens sons, Harold Gwynne and Rupert Stanley as Managing Directors.

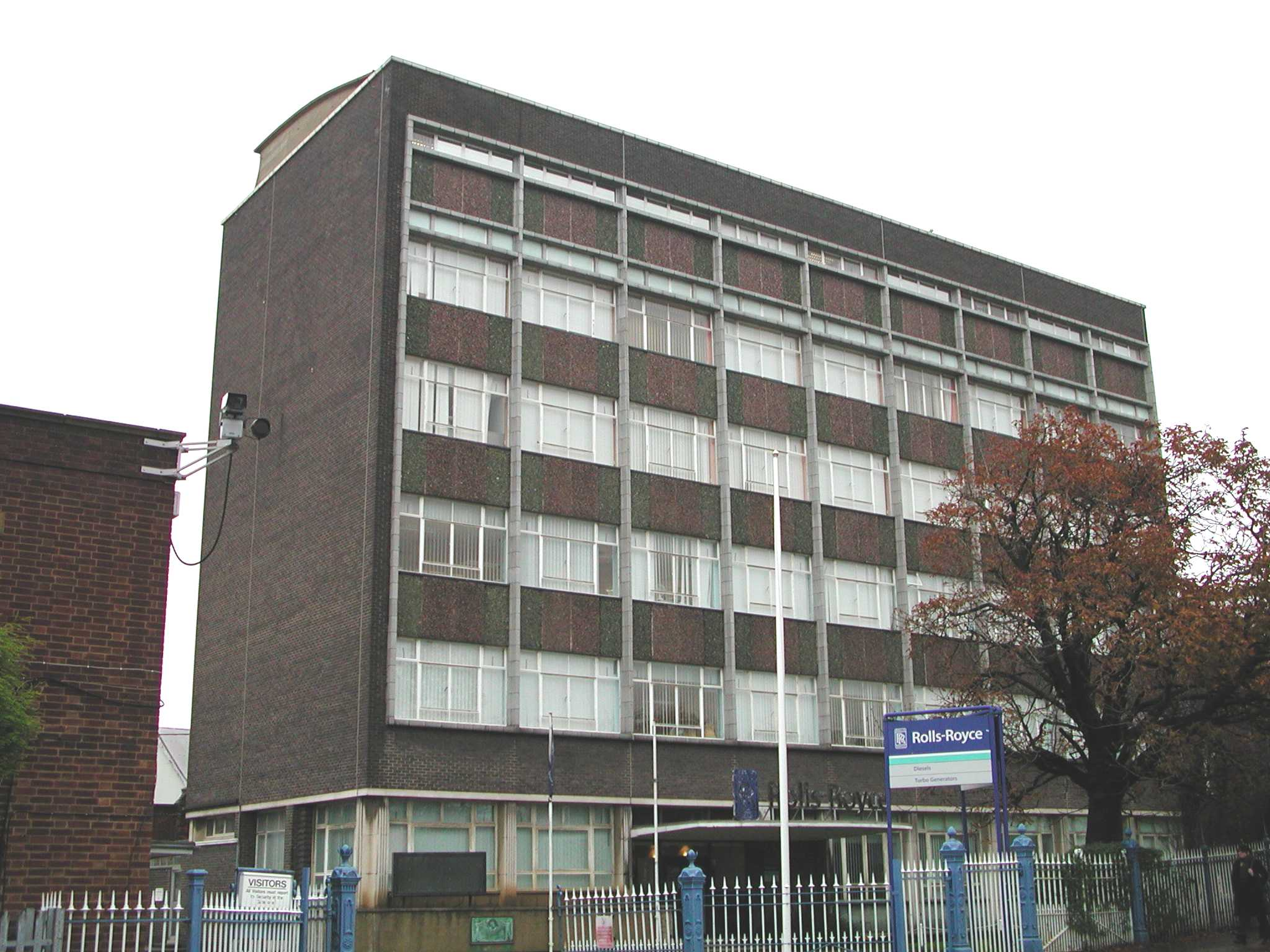
W. H. Allen & Sons Co. Ltd Queens Engineering Works, Bedford Main Office Block in 2002

In 1955 the Company purchased the industrial premises of Messrs. Fisher Humphries and Co. Ltd., a firm of agricultural engineers at Atlas Works, Pershore, Worcestershire. Epicyclic gear manufacture was transferred from Bedford to Pershore in 1956.

In 1960 William Foster & Co. Ltd and its subsidiary Gwynne's Pumps were acquired. In 1968 the Company merged with Belliss & Morcom of Birmingham to form Amalgamated Power Engineering (APE). In 1981 APE was acquired by Northern Engineering Industries plc (NEI) based in Gosforth, Newcastle upon Tyne.

In 1988 the pump business was sold to Weir Pumps while the steam turbine business was sold to Allen Steam Turbines in Oakley, Bedfordshire.

NEI was acquired by Rolls-Royce plc in 1989. The diesel business continued at Queens Engineering Works, Bedford as part of the Rolls-Royce Power Engineering (RRPE) group, until the factory was closed in 2000. Allen Diesels purchased the intellectual property rights of Allen diesel engines and operate from the Pilgrim Centre in Bedford.
