= Mark IX tank =

British armoured fighting vehicle

Mark IX
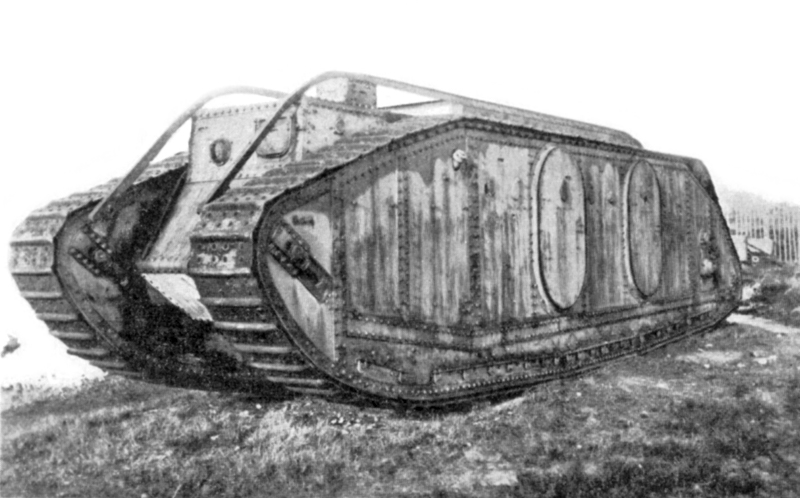
- Mark IX
- Type: Armoured personnel carrier
- Place of origin: United Kingdom

Production history
- Designer: Lt. G.J. Rackham
- Manufacturer: Marshall, Sons & Co.
- No. built: 34 (total)

Specifications
- Mass: 27 tonnes (27 long tons; 30 short tons)
- Length: 9.73 m (31 ft 11 in)
- Width: 2.5 m (8 ft 2 in)
- Height: 2.64 m (8 ft 8 in)
- Crew: 4: 1 commander, 1 driver, 1 mechanic, 1 machine gunner; up to 30 men could be carried.
- Armour: 10 mm
- Main armament: 2 x 0.303 in (7.7 mm) machine guns
- Secondary armament: none, but loopholes for 16 soldiers
- Engine: Ricardo 6-cylinder petrol engine 150 brake horsepower (110 kW)
- Power/weight: 5.6 horsepower per tonne (4.2 kW/t)
- Suspension: unsprung
- Operational range: 20 miles (32 km)
- Maximum speed: 6.9 km/h (4.29 mph)

The Mark IX tank was a British armoured fighting vehicle from the First World War. It was the world's first specialised armoured personnel carrier (APC).

== Development ==
During the first actions with tanks, it became clear that infantry often could not keep up with the tanks; not because soldiers were too slow—the early tanks themselves could only move at a walking pace—but because soldiers on foot remained vulnerable to machine gun fire, though tanks had been invented to solve that problem. On many occasions, positions gained at great cost were immediately lost for lack of infantry to consolidate. It was thought this problem might be solved by cramming a few infantry soldiers into each tank, but the atmosphere inside was of such poor quality that the soldiers became ill and eventually lost consciousness. When exposed to fresh air again, the crew were incapacitated for about an hour while recovering from the noxious fumes inside the tank. They would be sick and suffer from severe headaches.

In the summer of 1917, at the same time as another 'carrier' tank, the Gun Carrier Mark I, was under development, Lieutenant G.J. Rackham was ordered to design an armoured vehicle specifically for troop transport. He cooperated with Eustace Tennyson d'Eyncourt, the chairman of the Landships Committee. Design was complicated by a demand that the vehicle could be fitted with sponsons, converting it into a more modern battle tank than the Mark V tank, in case the Mark VIII tank design proved a failure and the type was still designated as a tank, a 'Mark IX' to succeed the Mark VIII but that requirement was soon dropped due to its complexity.

=== Prototype construction and production ===
In September 1917 Armstrong, Whitworth & Co. in Newcastle-upon-Tyne began constructing two prototypes of a pure transport vehicle that would become the Mark IX, which could also serve as a supply tank. The prototypes were approved the following year, at a time when it had become clear that a possible alternative, the stretched Mark V* tank, was unsuited for infantry transport. Two hundred Mark IXs were ordered from the tractor manufacturer Marshall, Sons & Co. of Gainsborough, Lincolnshire but by the end of the Great War only three had been finished, out of a total ultimate production run of thirty-four. A specially designed sledge developed by the tank workshop in France, that allowed an additional 10 long tons (10 t) of stores to be hauled, was tried.

== Description ==
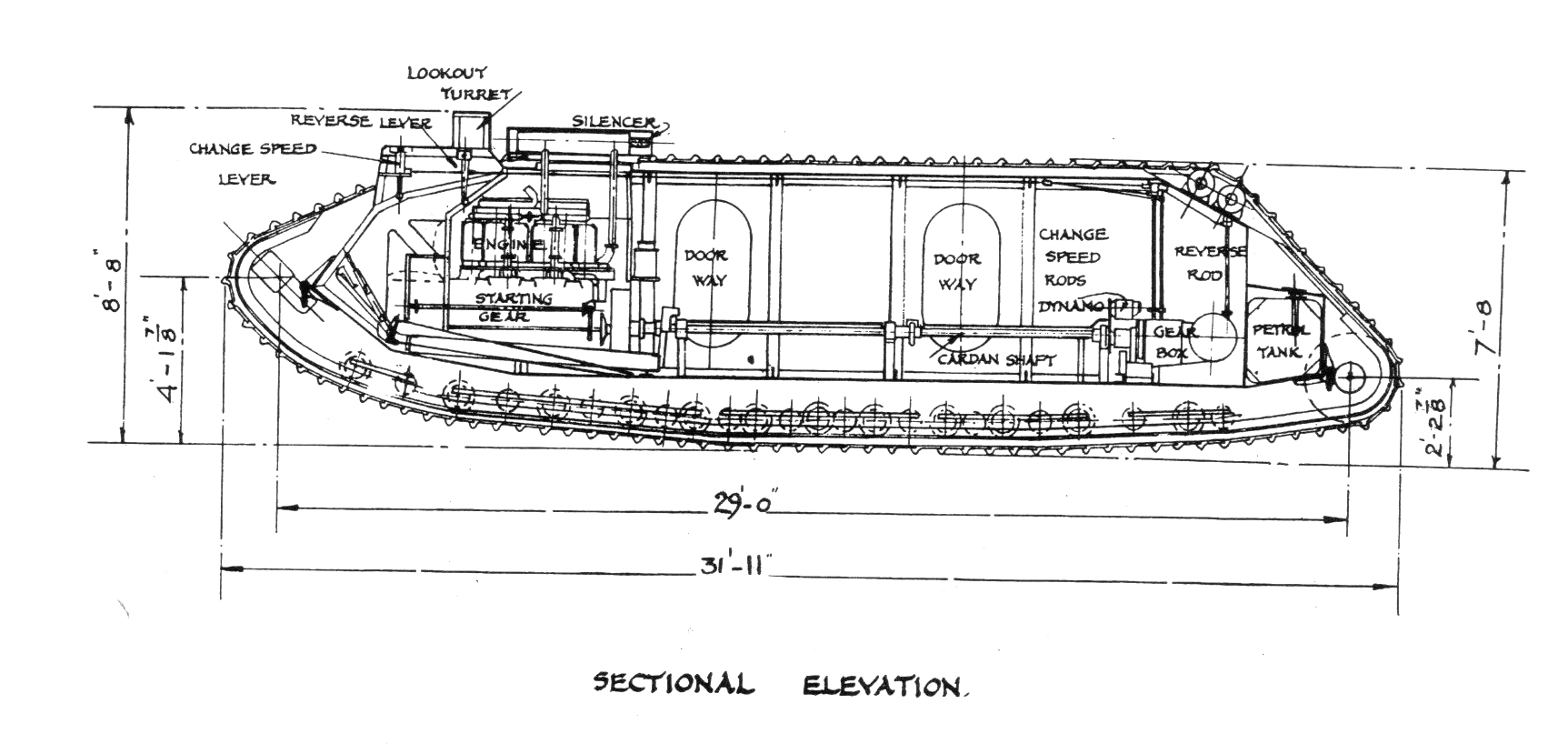
Internal arrangement of a Mark IX tank

As there was no time for a completely new design, the Mark IX was based on the Mark V, with the hull lengthened to 9.73 m (31 ft 11 in). The 150 hp Ricardo engine was moved to the front, the gearbox to the back and the suspension girders left out entirely. This created an inner space 4 m (13 ft 1 in) long and 2.45 m (8 ft 0 in) wide, enough room for thirty (officially even fifty) soldiers or ten tons of cargo. To ensure sufficient stiffness for the chassis, the floor was reinforced by heavy transverse girders. The infantry inside had to contend with the control rods for the gears running along the roof and the drive shaft through the middle. Unfortunately for the infantrymen, no seats were built in for them in the tank.

The crew proper consisted of a driver sitting on the left and a commander sitting to the right of him (the first time in a British tank making this concession to the prevailing traffic conditions in France), a mechanic, and a machine gunner who could man a gun in a hatch at the rear. A second machine gun was fitted in the front. Designed as an armoured personnel carrier, the type had elements of an infantry fighting vehicle, as along each side of the hull there were eight loopholes, through which the soldiers could fire their rifles. Four of the total of sixteen loopholes were in the four oval doors (two to each side) through which soldiers could embark and disembark.

Despite the use of thinner—0.39 inches (10 mm)—armour, the operational weight was still 27 long tons (27 t) and the speed only 4.3 mph (6.9 km/h). The tank could also carry supplies in a tray on the roof behind the commander's armoured observation turret (being the highest point at 8.7 feet (2.64 m)), while towing up to three loaded sledges. Rackham tried to improve internal conditions by putting a large silencer on the roof together with ventilation fans; but there was still no separate engine compartment and it is, therefore, questionable whether the project achieved the goal of a vehicle capable of delivering a squad of infantry in fighting condition, even given the severely limited operational range of the Mark IX.

== Operational history and project ==
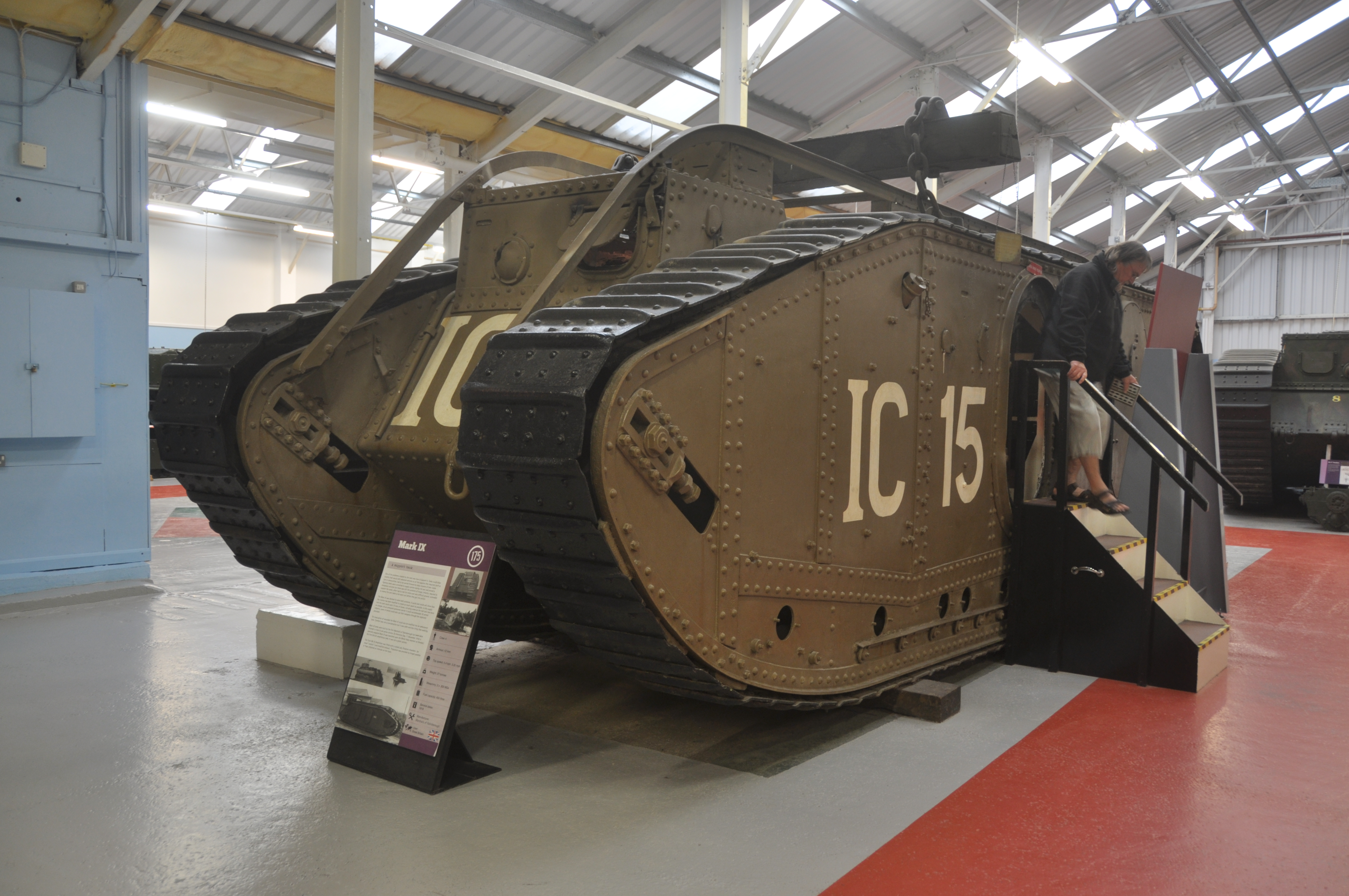
The Mark IX tank at The Tank Museum

The Mark IXs were used for some years after the war. Pictures exist of vehicles carrying the designation "IC" painted on their hulls, probably indicating they were indeed used as "Infantry Carriers". The type – named The Pig after the low front track silhouette that gave a snout-like appearance – was used as the basis of two conversions: one of the first three built was used as an armoured ambulance, while another was rebuilt as an amphibious tank by the staff of the test base at Dollis Hill.

== "The Duck" Amphibious Conversion ==
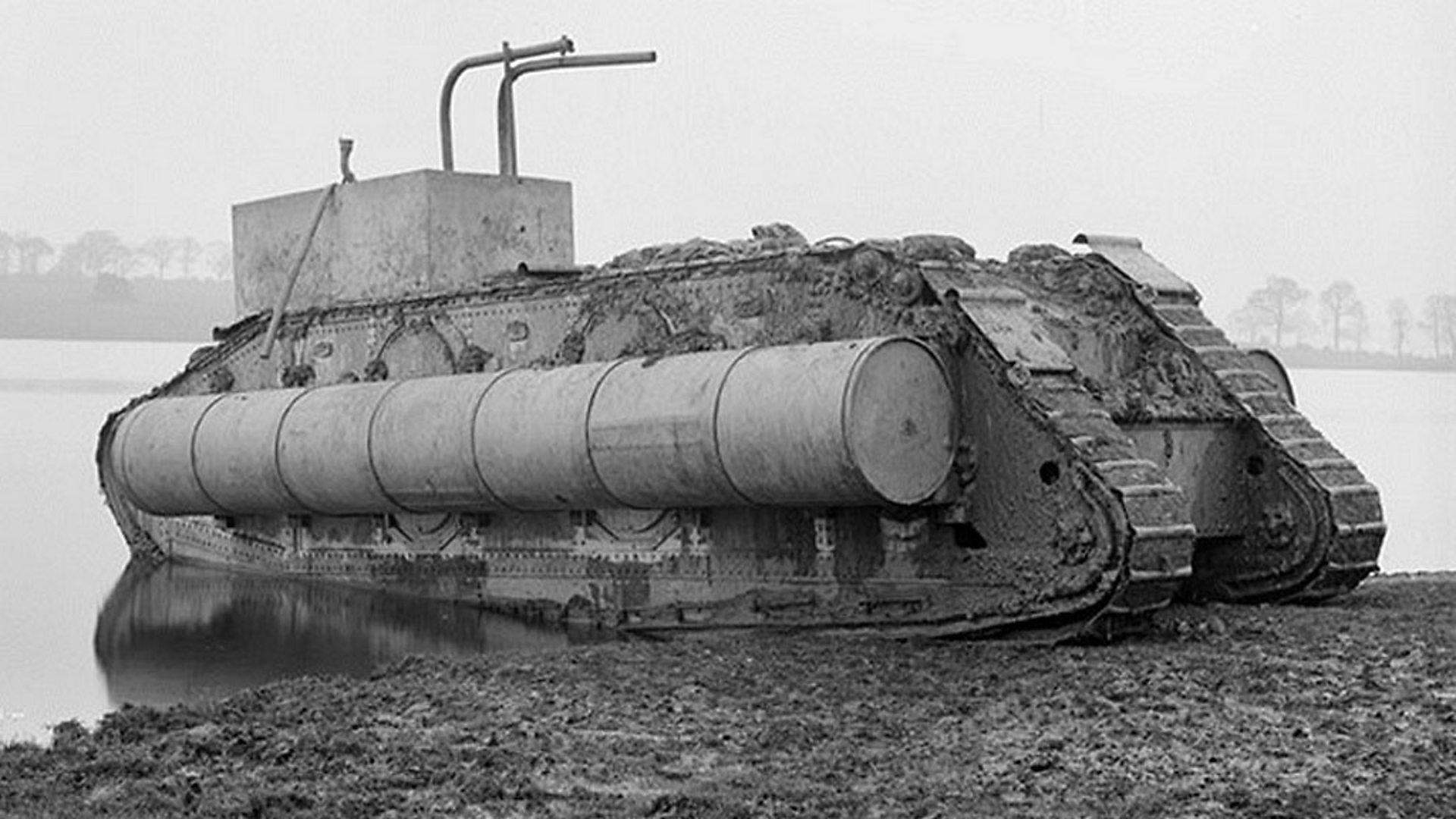
Mark IX Amphibious Conversion heading into Welsh Harp Reservoir

Already a bulky vehicle – the probable reason the Mark IX was selected as the basis for an amphibious tank – its displacement was improved by fitting drums at the front and sides. Long wooden boards were attached to the track links but at one side of the board only; as they reached the curve of the track they would project, acting as paddles. Pictures were made of a floating tank in Hendon Reservoir on 11 November 1918, the day of the Armistice. According to oral tradition, this vehicle was named The Duck but there are doubts as to its veracity. The photographs show that a large rectangular superstructure had been placed around the cab and from this superstructure pipes projected upwards, likely the outlets of bilge pumps. The vehicle was for the occasion manned by Navy personnel.

The last surviving Mark IX now resides at The Tank Museum, Bovington.

== Gallery ==
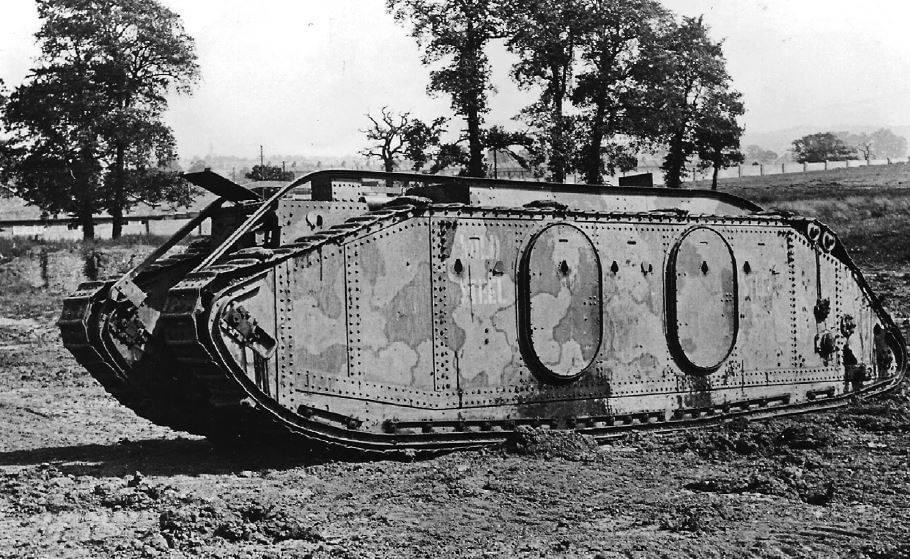
Mark IX at Dollis Hill, prior to the amphibious modifications.

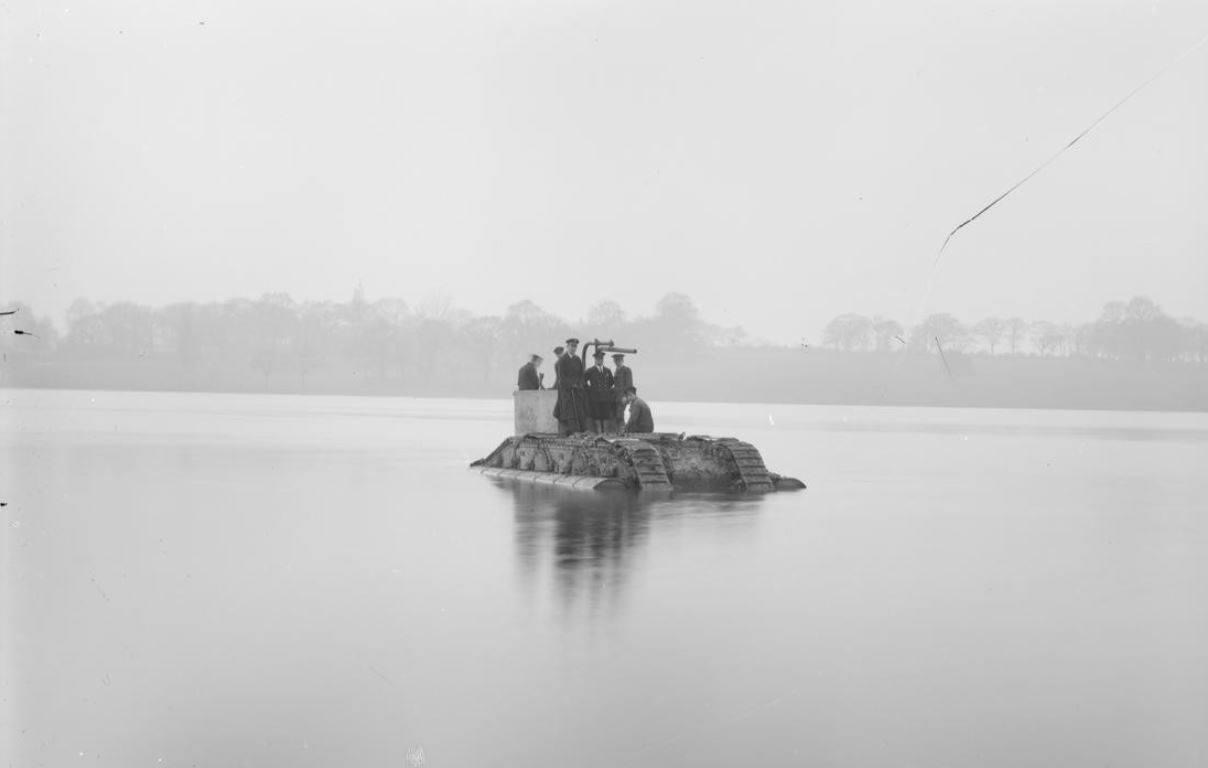
Mark IX Tank Amphibious Conversion in Welsh Harp Reservoir, with all of its passengers out on top

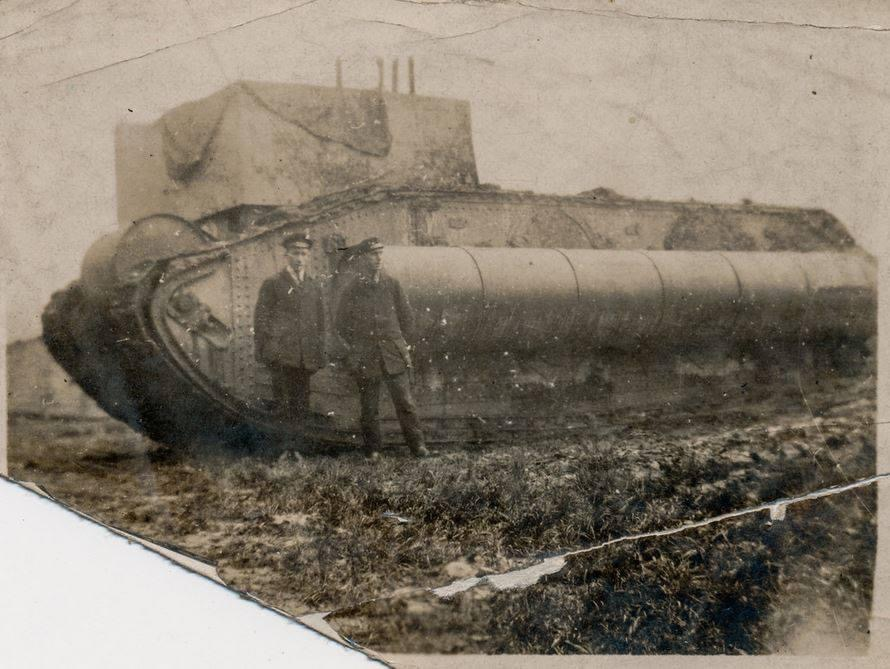
Mark IX Amphibious Conversion, with two men alongside it, at Welsh Harp Reservoir

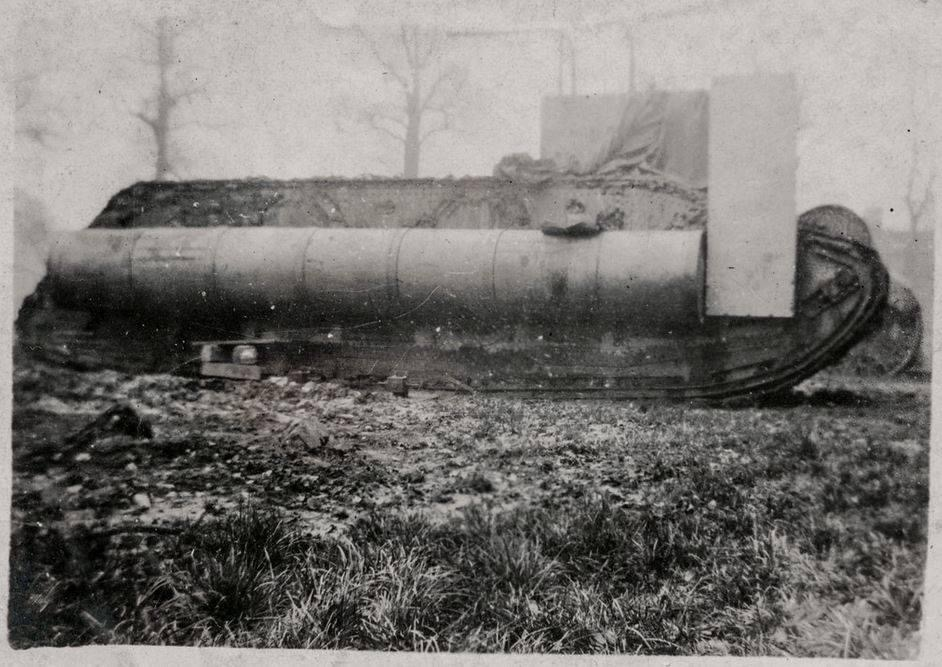

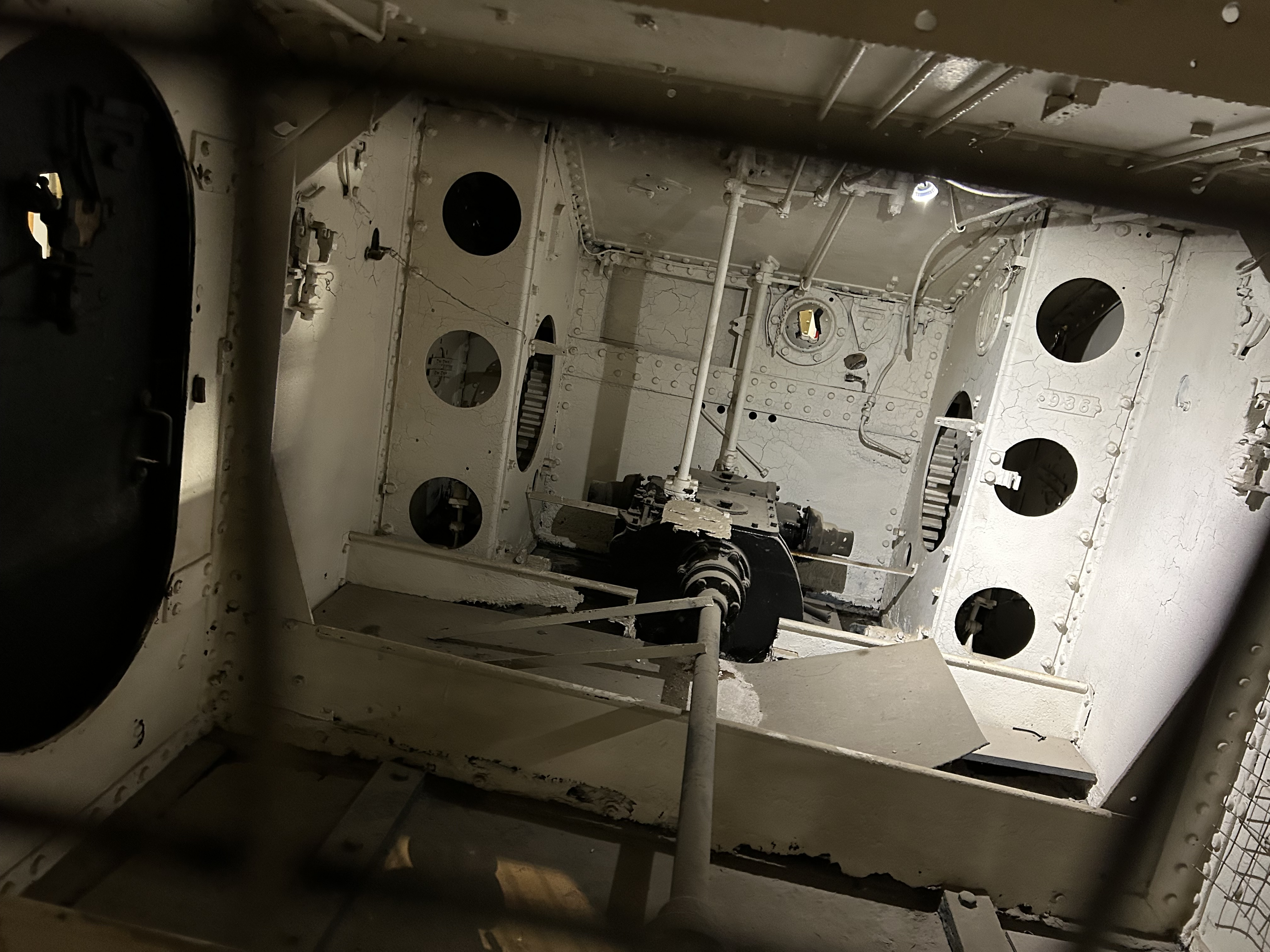
Inside the troop compartment of the preserved MK IX tank at Bovington.
