= Mark V tank =

British WWI tank

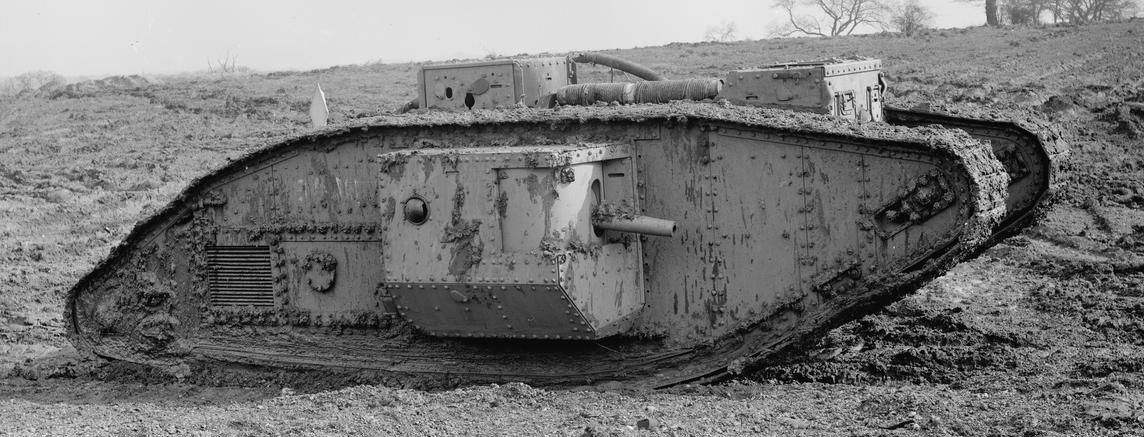
- A British Mark V (Male) tank
- Type: Heavy tank
- Place of origin: United Kingdom

Service history
- In service: 1918 – (last known) 1945
- Wars: First World War; Russian Civil War

Production history
- Designer: Major W. G. Wilson
- Designed: 1917
- Manufacturer: Metropolitan Amalgamated Railway Carriage & Wagon Company, Birmingham, England
- Produced: 1917 – June 1918
- No. built: 400

Specifications
- Mass: Male: 29 tons "battle weight" Female: 28 tons
- Length: 26 ft 5 in (8 m)
- Width: Male: 13 ft 6 inch (4.1m); Female: 10 ft 6 in
- Height: 2.64 m (8 ft 8 in)
- Crew: 8 (commander, driver, and six gunners)
- Armour: 16 mm (0.63 in) maximum front 12 mm sides 8 mm roof and "belly"
- Main armament: Male: 2× 6-pounder (57-mm) 6 cwt QF guns with 207 rounds; 4× .303 in (7.7-mm) Hotchkiss Mk 1 Machine Gun; Female: 6× .303 in Hotchkiss Mk 1 Machine Gun
- Engine: 19 litre six cylinder in-line Ricardo petrol engine 150 hp (110 kW) at 1200 rpm
- Power/weight: Male: 5.2 hp/ton
- Transmission: 4 forward 1 reverse, Wilson epicyclic in final drive
- Fuel capacity: 93 imperial gallons (420 L)
- Operational range: 45 mi (72 km) radius of action about 10 hours endurance
- Maximum speed: 5 mph (8.0 km/h) maximum
- Steering system: Wilson epicyclic steering

The British Mark V tank (Note: Meaning 'Mark 5': Britain used Roman numerals to designate successive models of early heavy tanks) was an upgraded version of the Mark IV tank.

The tank was improved in several aspects over the Mark IV, chiefly the new steering system, transmission and 150 bhp engine, but it fell short in other areas, particularly its insufficient ventilation, leading to carbon monoxide poisoning for the crew. Various versions were fitted with a variety of armament including 6-pounder guns and machine guns.

It was first deployed in July 1918 on the Western Front at the Battle of Hamel; then at the Battle of Amiens, and on the Hindenburg Line during the closing months of World War I.

During the Allied intervention in the Russian Civil War on the White Russian side, four Mark Vs were delivered to Arkhangelsk, four to Tallinn, Estonia, and around 70 were delivered to Novorossiysk in southern Russia. The survivors were captured and used by the Red Army.

There were two main further variants, the lengthened Mark V* and a few Mark V**s with a more powerful engine and wider tracks. A planned Mark V*** was never built. There are eleven surviving Mark V tanks. The Mark VIII tank was an enlarged Mark V with greater power: only those with the Liberty engine saw post-war service in the US. A further unarmed development was the Mark IX tank, one of the first armoured personnel carriers, which saw limited use in Britain after the war.

In general the Mark V was successful, especially given its limited service history, and somewhat primitive design dating back to 1915.

== History ==
The Mark V was, at first, intended to be a completely new design of tank, of which a wooden mock-up had been completed; however, when the new engine and transmission originally planned for the Mark IV became available in December 1917, the first, more advanced Mark V design was abandoned to avoid disrupting production. The designation "Mark V" was switched to an improved version of the Mark IV, equipped with the new systems. The original design of the Mark IV was to have been a large improvement on the Mark III, but had been scaled back due to technical delays. The Mark V thus turned out very similar to the original design of the Mark IV – i.e. a greatly modified Mark III.

Production of the Mark V started at Metropolitan Carriage & Wagon at the end of 1917; the first tanks arrived in France in May 1918. Four hundred were built, 200 Males and Females; the "Males" armed with 6-pounder (57 mm) guns and machine guns, the "Females" with machine guns only. Several were converted to Hermaphrodites (sometimes known as "Mark V Composite") by fitting one male and one female sponson. This measure was intended to ensure that female tanks would not be outgunned when faced with captured British male tanks in German use, or the Germans' own A7V.

The Mark V was to be followed by the more advanced Tank Mark VI, but this was abandoned in December 1917, to ensure sufficient production by British, American, and French factories of the Tank Mark VIII for a planned 1919 offensive. However, the war ended in November 1918, and few Mark VIIIs would be built (most of those completed in Britain were immediately scrapped). After the war, most of the British Army's tank units were disbanded, leaving five tank battalions equipped with either the Mark V or the Medium Mark C. The British Army's interest shifted more to lighter, faster tanks, and the Mark V was partially replaced by the Vickers Medium Mark I during the mid-1920s. The Vickers A1E1 Independent reached prototype stage in 1926, but it was abandoned for lack of funds. The remaining Mark Vs appear to have been replaced by medium tanks by the end of the decade.

== Modifications ==
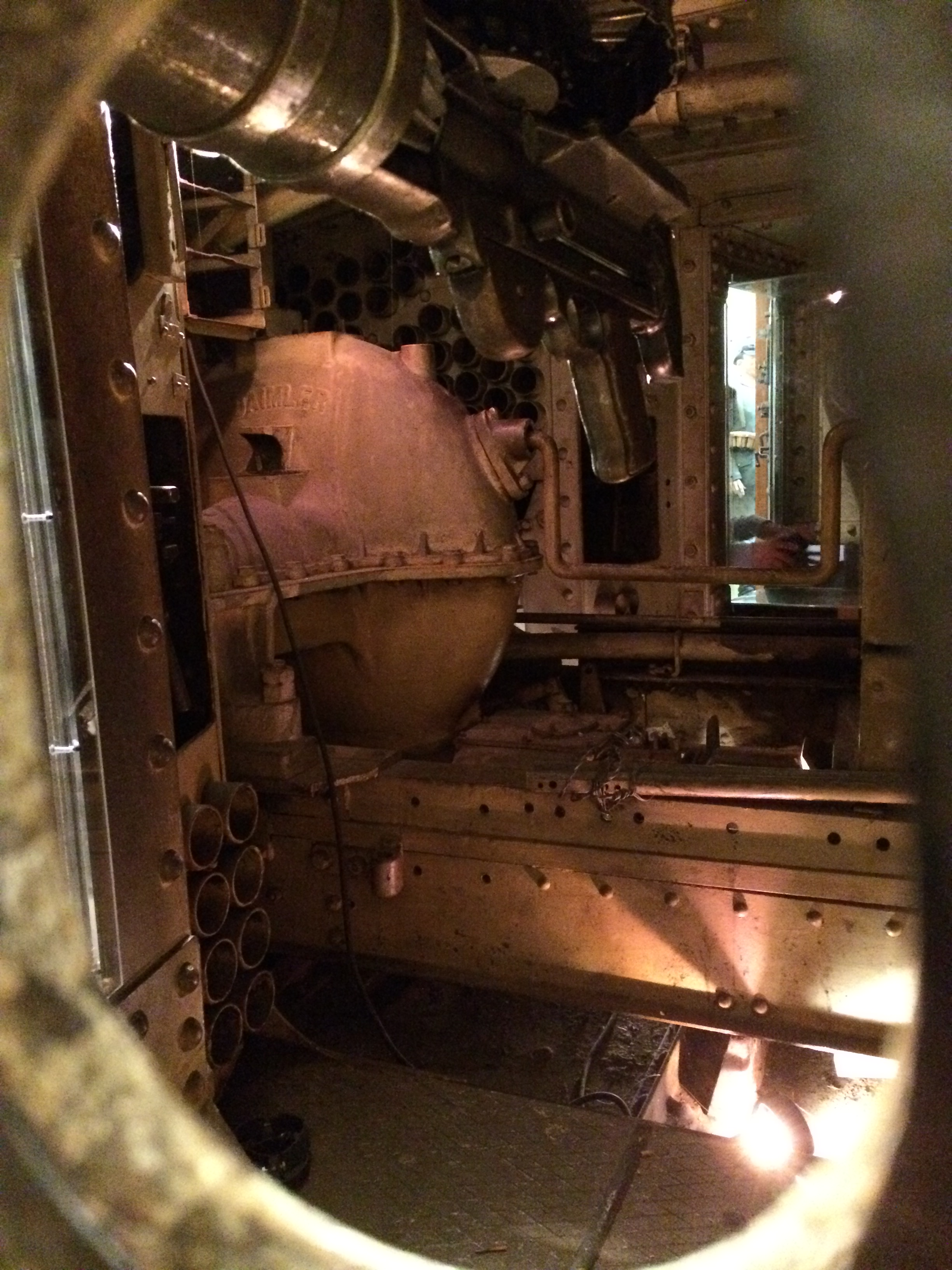
The huge differential gear at the rear of a Mark IV tank

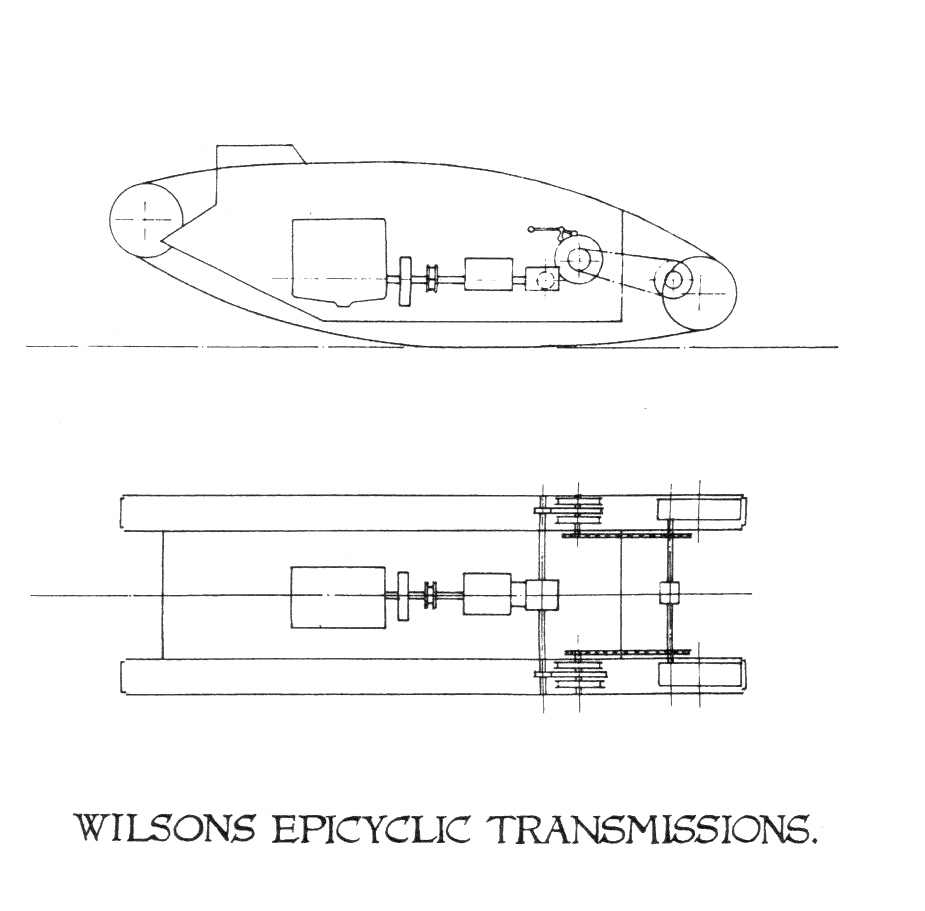
Diagram of the Wilson epicyclic transmission

In early 1917, some British tanks were tested with various experimental powerplant and transmissions ordered by Albert Stern. These included petrol-electric schemes, hydraulic systems, a multiple clutch system, and an epicyclic gearbox designed by Major W. G. Wilson. Though the petrol-electrics had advantages, Wilson's design was capable of production and was selected for use in future tanks.

The use of Wilson's epicyclic steering gear in the Mark V meant that the driver could control all aspects of the transmission: three extra crew members had been required in previous versions of the tank, two gearsmen to change low and high gears on either side of the tank, and the commander who operated the brakes and skid steering. There was much more space at the rear after the removal of the massive differential gear (originally designed for the Daimler-Foster agricultural tractor) fitted to all the earlier tanks. On the roof towards the rear of the tank, behind the engine, was a second raised cabin, with hinged sides that allowed the crew to attach the unditching beam without exiting the vehicle. An additional machine-gun mount was fitted at the rear of the hull.

The Mark V had a new, more powerful six cylinder engine (also ordered by Stern) designed by Harry Ricardo, displacing 19 litres and developing 150 bhp (110 kW). According to J. F. C. Fuller, the Ricardo engine was of a "somewhat unorthodox design", but it was highly efficient and, with proper care and attention, gave very little trouble. This 'unorthodox' description related to Ricardo's use of crosshead pistons which separated the lubricating oil from the heat of combustion, with the crosshead and gudgeon pin running in its own separate guide. The engine used conventional poppet valves, unlike the Daimler sleeve valve engines used in the previous tanks; because very few men or officers had any experience of adjusting valve mechanisms, extra instruction was needed for tank personnel. The Ricardo engine could have been considerably more powerful, but its design was restricted by two considerations. Firstly, it needed to fit in the exact same footprint as the original Daimler 105 hp engine in the older tanks Marks I–IV, resulting in a taller engine; secondly, Wilson had advised Ricardo that the proposed 200 bhp (150 kW) would place too much strain on the transmission, and it was limited to 150 bhp.

In late 1917 Ricardo's began production of the 150 hp engine. An order for a total of 5,342 units was fulfilled by subcontracting the work out to nine other manufacturers from November 1917 to July 1918: Tangyes Bros. Ltd., Birmingham; Browett, Lindley & Co; National Gas Engine, Ltd; - founded by the Bickerton Brothers - Henry Neild Bickerton co-formed another subcontractor, Mirrlees, Bickerton and Day; British Westinghouse; Willans & Robinson; Crossley Motors; Peter Brotherhood Ltd; Perkins Ltd; L. Gardner and Sons; and Ruston & Hornsby.

== Operating issues ==
The Ricardo engine was still in the centre of the crew compartment which led to miserable crew conditions from its heat output. The noise also interfered with crew communication.

The ventilation was the area in which the Mark V suffered its largest weakness. The previous Marks I–IV drew cooling air from inside the tank, through the radiator, and then expelled the air through a vent, which provided a constant supply of moving air for the crew. In contrast, the Mark V drew air from outside the tank, across the radiator, and then expelled the air though a vent, which left the air inside the crew compartment stagnant. The only ventilation for the crew compartment, other than the driver and gunner view-ports, located on all sides of the tank, was a roof-mounted Keith fan. This fan was inadequate for maintaining a stable supply of clean air for the crew of a Mark V; exhaust and gun-smoke were trapped with the crew, which caused many crewmen to grow ill and, in the most extreme cases, was enough to render them unconscious; either way the crew was practically unfit for combat within a few hours.

An extra sliding shutter was later fitted which drew foul air out of the fighting compartment, which is thought to have made some improvement.

== Variants ==
=== Mark V* ===
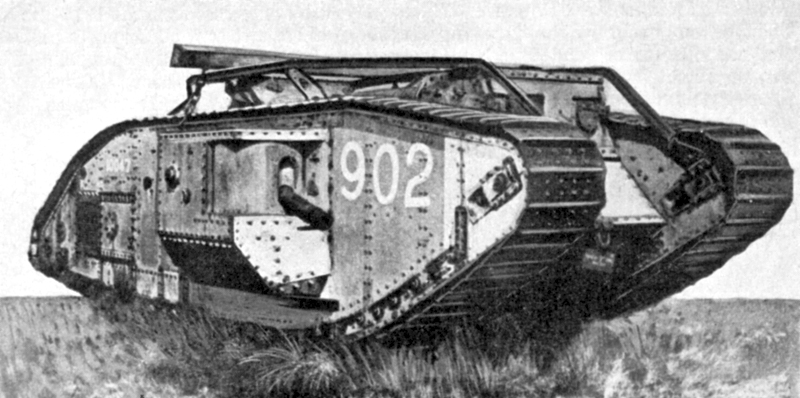
A British Mark V* tank—on the roof the tank carries an "unditching beam" on rails, that could be attached to the tracks and used to extricate the vehicle from difficult muddy trenches and shell craters

In an attempt to stop the tank threat, the German Army began digging wider trenches that made it difficult for tanks to cross. For example, trenches in the Hindenburg Line were widened to 11 or 12 feet (3.4 or 3.7 m), which was more than the British tanks' 10 feet (3.0 m) trench-crossing ability. To counter this, Sir William Tritton developed the 'tadpole tail', an extension of the track horns to be fitted to the back of a Mark IV tank, which lengthened the tank by about 9 feet (2.7 m). Although 300 sets of tails were sent to France in the spring of 1918, they were never fitted, and the design was never used in combat.

This in turn caused Major Philip Johnson of the Central Tank Corps Workshops to devise a plan of his own in early 1918. He cut a Mark IV in half and inserted three extra panels, lengthening the entire hull by six feet. Three vehicles were modified in this way. (It was believed for a long time that most Mark V* (Note: the asterisk (*) in early British tank designations was usually pronounced as "star" when spoken, e.g., Mark Five-star, or Mark Five-star-star, etc.) had been field conversions made by Johnson. They were in fact all new, factory-built to a new design). The Mark V* had a reshaped rear cupola incorporating 2 extra machine-gun mounts, a door in each side of the hull, with an extra machine-gun mount on each. This tank weighed 33 tons.

The extra space also allowed up to fourteen men to be carried in addition to the standard crew: the 1st Battalion Royal Tank Regiment claimed that it was possible to squeeze in 2 Lewis guns with crews of two; 2 Vickers guns each with a four-man crew; plus an infantry scout and an officer. However, they tended to succumb to the fume-filled atmosphere as described above.

The total orders for the Mark V* were 500 Males and 200 Females, 579 had been built by the Armistice – the order was completed by Metropolitan Carriage in March 1919. Shortly before the end of the War, Britain supplied France with 100 Mk V* (80 males and 20 females). They were not used in action, but remained in French service throughout the 1920s. Retired from active service in 1930, they were kept in storage to have heavy tanks to discard in case the Conference for the Reduction and Limitation of Armaments requested it.

=== Mark V** ===
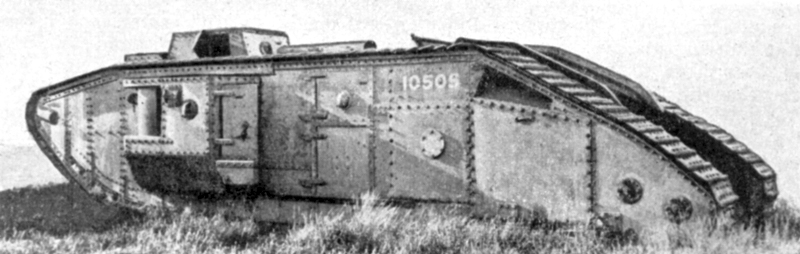
A British Mark V** tank

Because the Mark V* had been lengthened, its original length-width ratio had been spoiled. Lateral forces in a turn now became unacceptably high causing thrown tracks and an enormous turning circle. Therefore, Major Wilson redesigned the track in May 1918, with a stronger curve to the lower run reducing ground contact (but increasing ground pressure as a trade-off) and the tracks were widened to 26.5 in (67 cm). The Mark V engine was bored out to give 225 hp (168 kW) and sat further back in the hull. The cabin for the driver was combined with the commander's cabin; there now was a separate machine gun position in the back. Of a revised order for 700 tanks (150 Females and 550 Males) only 25 were built and only one of those by the end of 1918.

=== Mark V*** ===
See: Mark X.

== Combat history ==
=== World War I (Western Front) ===
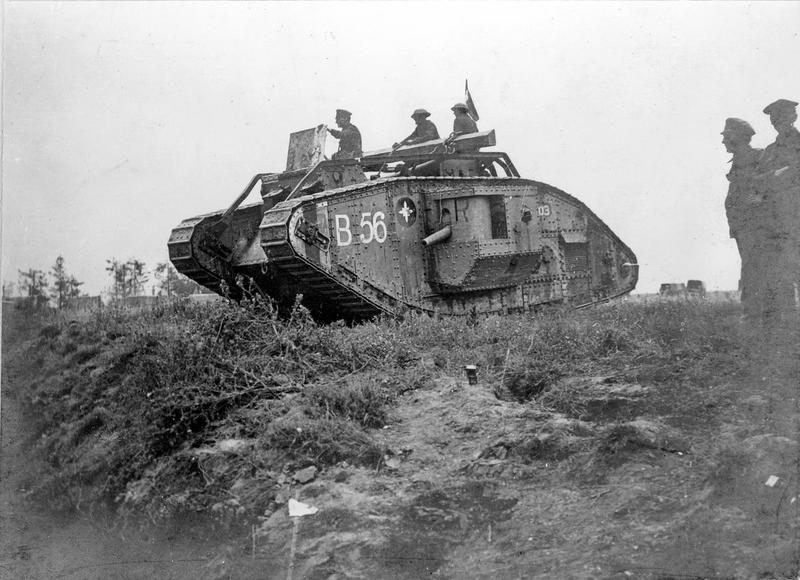
A Mark V tank at Lamotte-en-Santerre, 8 August 1918, leaving for an attack during the Battle of Amiens.

The Mk V made its combat debut during the Battle of Hamel on 4 July 1918. Sixty Mark Vs successfully supported Australian troops in an action that repaired the Australians' confidence in tanks, which had been badly damaged at Bullecourt. Thereafter Mk Vs were used in eight major actions before the end of the war.

During the Battle of Amiens in August 1918, 288 Mark V tanks, along with the new Whippet and Mk V*, penetrated the German lines in a foretaste of modern armoured warfare, and signalled the end of trench warfare.

The American 301st Heavy Tank Battalion was equipped with 19 Mark V and 21 Mark V* tanks in their first heavy tank action against the Hindenburg Line on 27 September 1918. Of the 21 Mark V* tanks, 9 were hit by artillery rounds (one totally destroyed), 2 hit British mines, 5 had mechanical problems, and 2 ditched in trenches. The battalion, however, did reach its objective.

=== Russian Civil War ===
Approximately 70 Mark V tanks supplied by Great Britain to the White Russian Army and subsequently captured by the Red Army in the course of the Russian Civil War were used in 1921 during the Red Army invasion of Georgia and contributed to the Soviet victory in the battle for Tbilisi. In the north, four Mark Vs had been delivered to White Russian forces in Arkhangelsk in 1919, and four to Tallinn, Estonia along with two Renault FTs.

=== World War II ===
In the defence of Tallinn by the Red Army against German forces in August 1941, the four Mk Vs previously operated by Estonia were planned to be used as dug-in fortifications. It is not known whether this plan was carried out in battle. It is believed that they were subsequently scrapped.

In 1945, Allied troops came across two badly damaged Mk V tanks in Berlin. Photographic evidence indicates that these were survivors of the Russian Civil War and had previously been displayed as a monument in Smolensk, Russia, before being brought to Berlin after the German invasion of the Soviet Union in 1941. Accounts of their active involvement in the Battle of Berlin have not been verified.

== Surviving vehicles ==
Eleven Mark V tanks survived. The majority are in Russia or Ukraine and are survivors of the tanks sent there to aid the White forces during the Russian Civil War.

- The Tank Museum, Bovington displays a Mark V Male, Number 9199. It was in action at the Battle of Amiens where its commander – Lt. HA Whittenbury – was awarded the Military Cross. It was subsequently damaged by artillery at Bellicourt in September 1918, during the Hundred Days Offensive. It has been at Bovington since 1925, and was used for demonstrations and filming. While this tank is maintained in running condition, the Bovington museum had made the decision to not run it again, because of the wear and tear that would be inflicted on the now-fragile, historic vehicle.

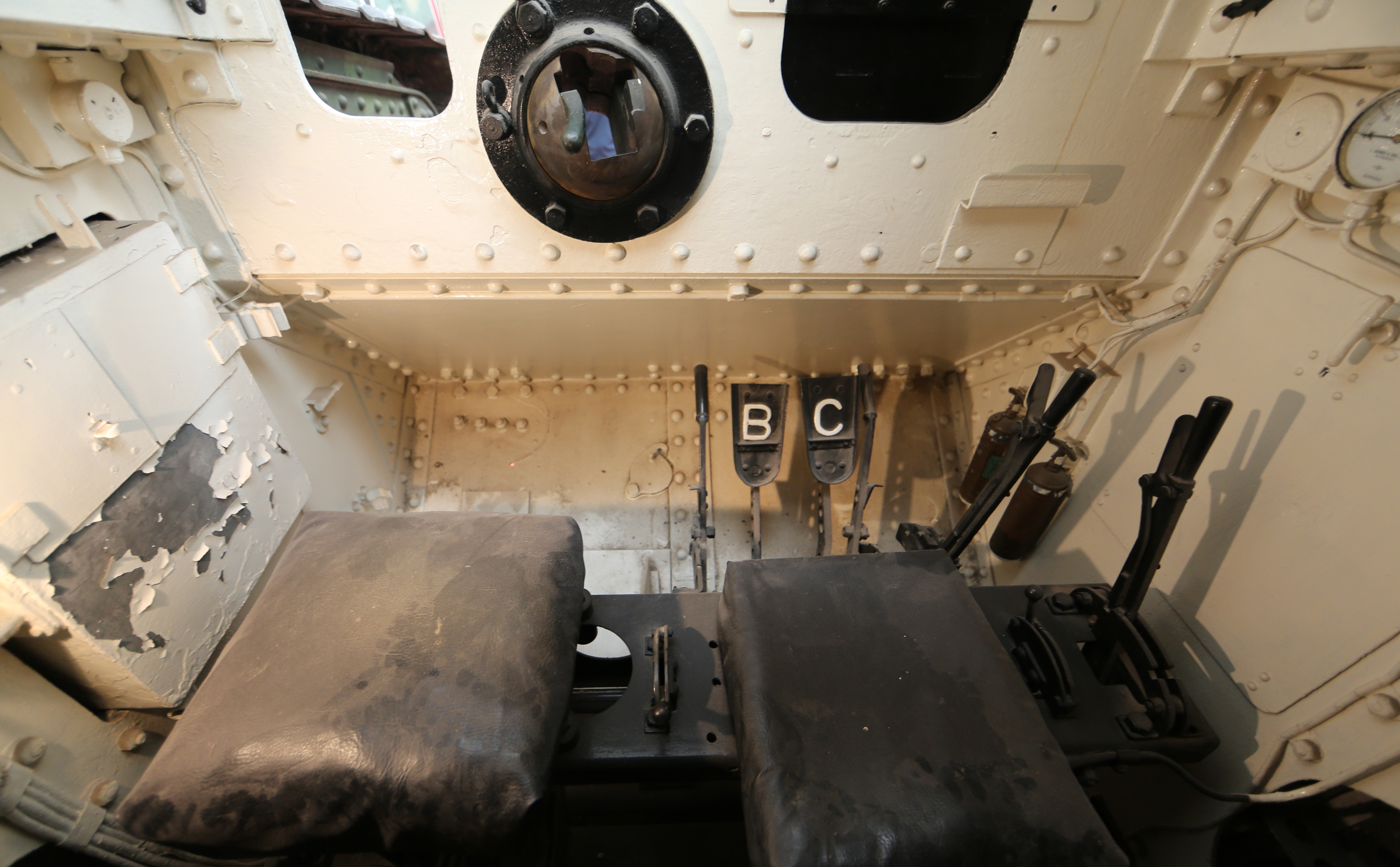
The driving and forward gunner position of Ol'Faithful

- A heavily restored Mark V Male, Devil, survives at the London Imperial War Museum. The right sponson was removed to allow a view of the tank's interior, but in the museum's 2013–2014 refit the vehicle was resited in such a way that the interior is no longer visible to the public.
- A Mark V Composite is at the Kubinka Tank Museum, Russia.
- A Mark V Female serves as memorial in Arkhangelsk. This was originally used by British forces during the Allied Intervention in the Russian Civil War.
- Two preserved Mark Vs, both Composites, form part of an outdoor memorial at Luhansk in Ukraine. Two more are in storage.
- A Mark V Composite is at the M. F. Sumtsov Kharkiv Historical Museum, Ukraine.
- A Mark V* Male, Number 9591, has been part of the U.S. Army Armor and Cavalry Collection at Fort Benning, Georgia, US since 2010. Issued to Company A, US 301st Heavy Tank Battalion and hit by a 57 mm (2.2 in) shell round on 27 September 1918 during the attack against the Hindenburg Line, it was repaired and sent back to the United States. It is the only surviving example of the Mark V*.
- A Mark V** Female: Ol'Faithful, is also preserved at Bovington. It never saw action during the war, but post–war was fitted with hydraulic lifting gear so it could carry and deploy portable bridges, and carry out other engineering tasks. During World War II, it was used as a ballast weight to test Bailey bridges.

== Gallery ==
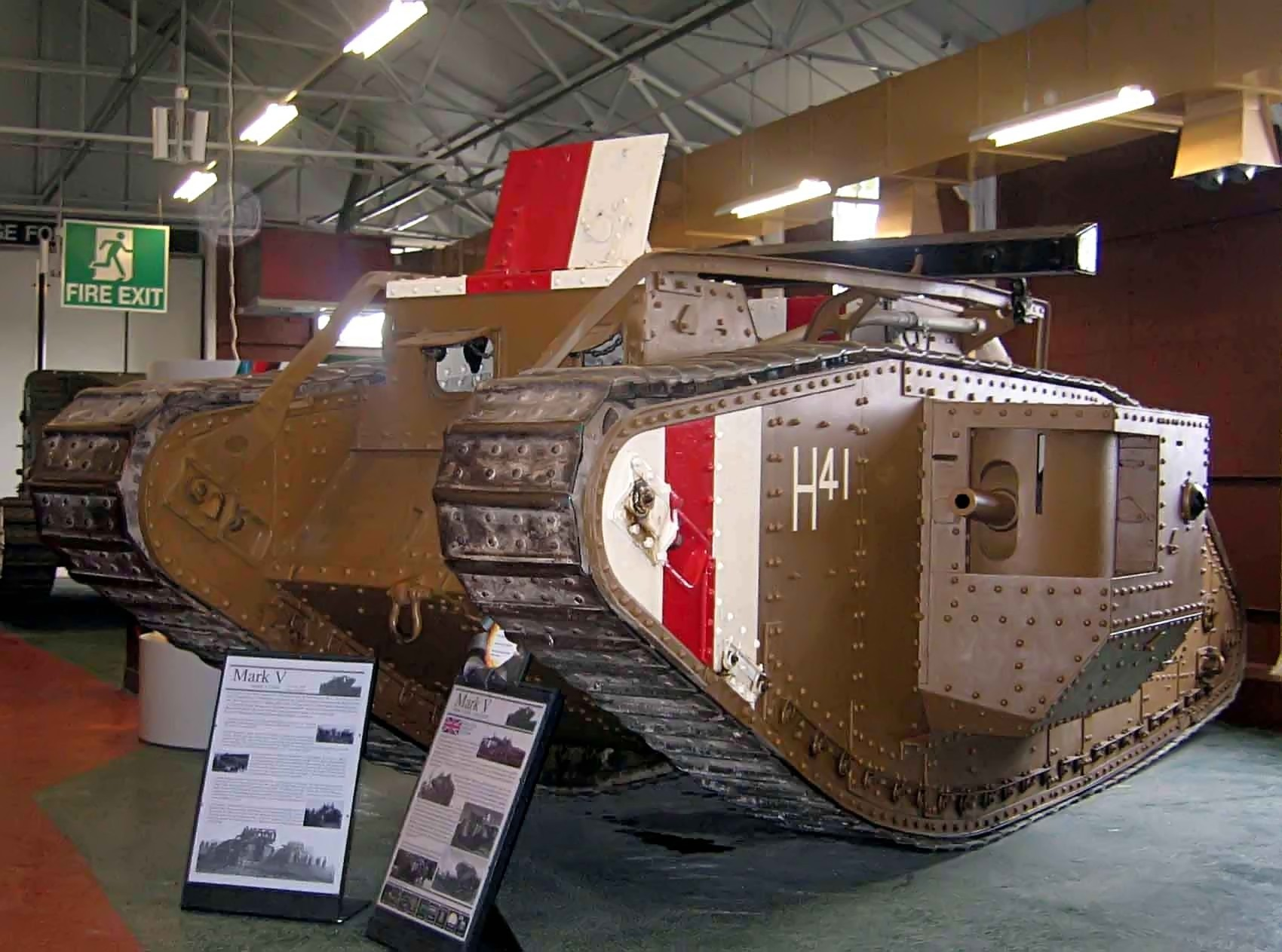
Mark V at the Tank Museum, Bovington. With vertical white-red-white British recognition stripes, still in use up to early part of World War II

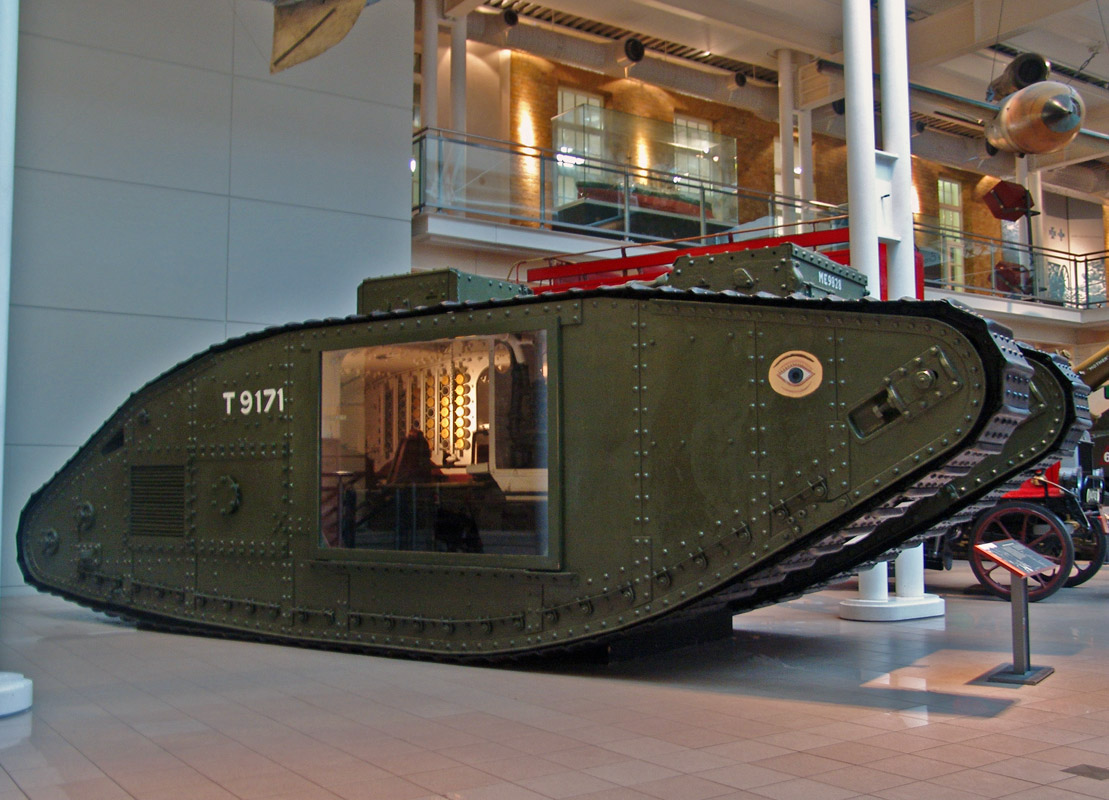
Imperial War Museum, London (2006)

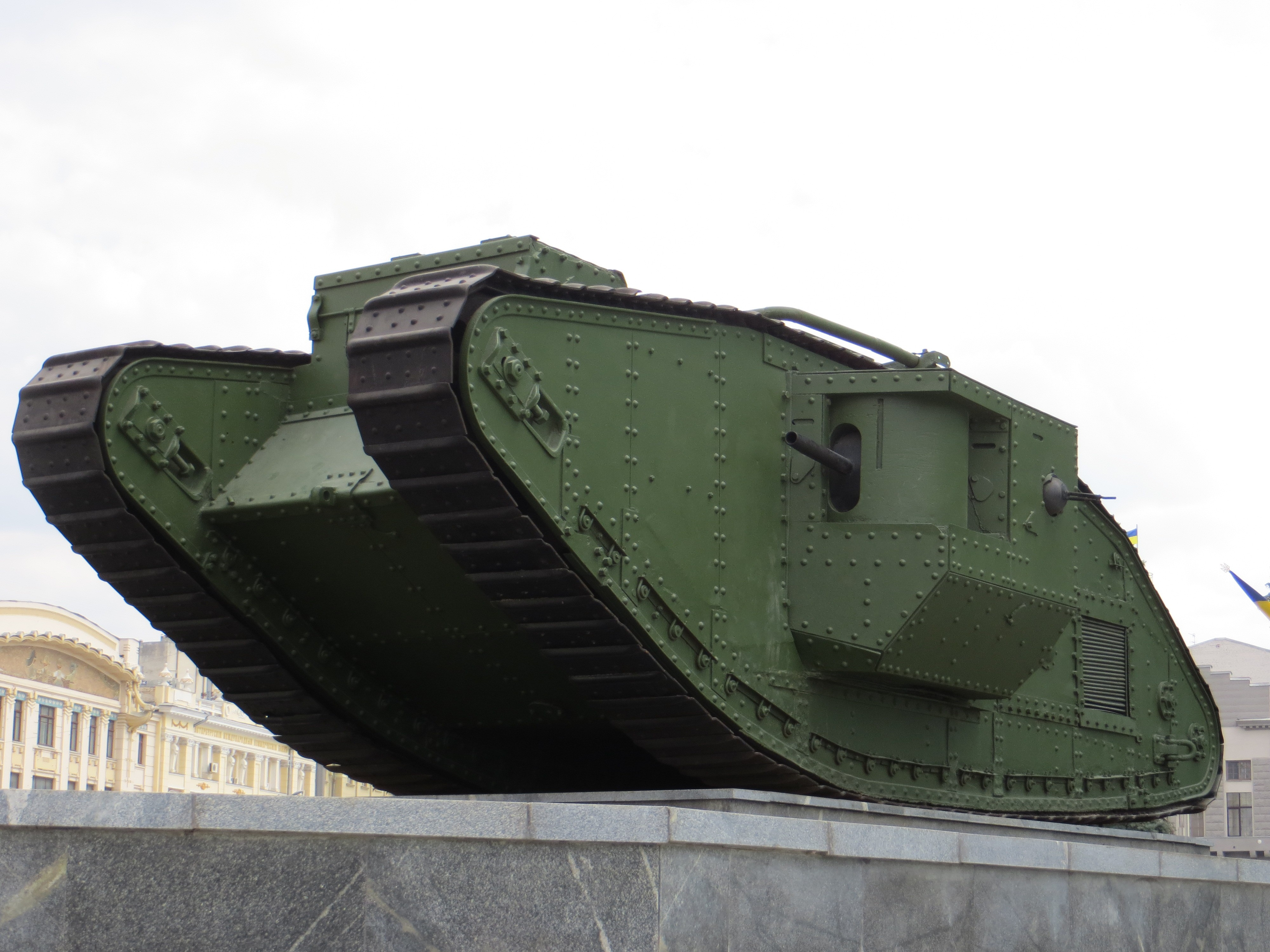
Mark V Composite tank in Kharkiv, Ukraine.

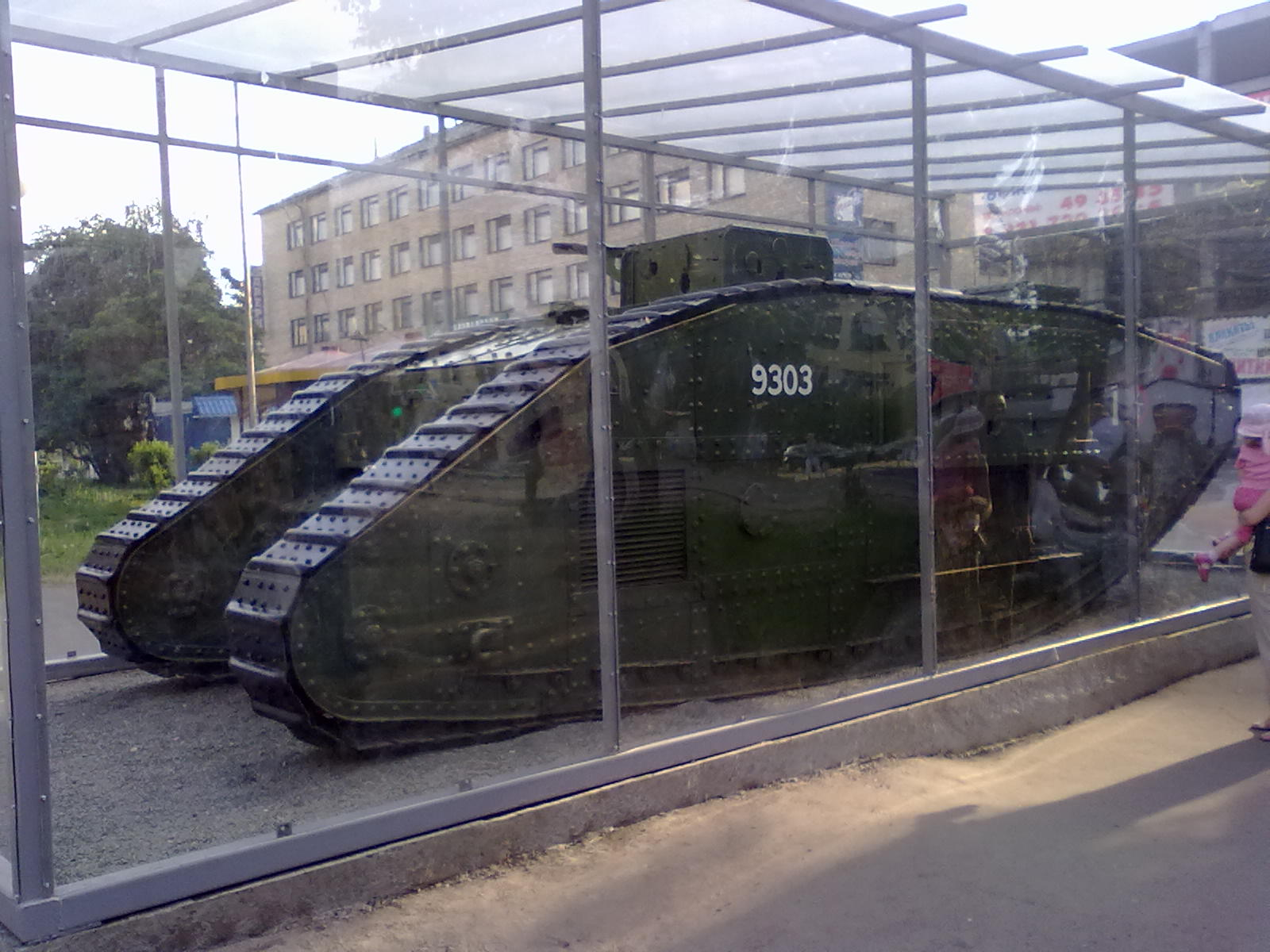
Mark V tank in Arkhangelsk, captured by the Red Army from the Whites.

== See also ==
- Mark V Composite tank in Estonian service
