= Unditching roller =

Military vehicle support device

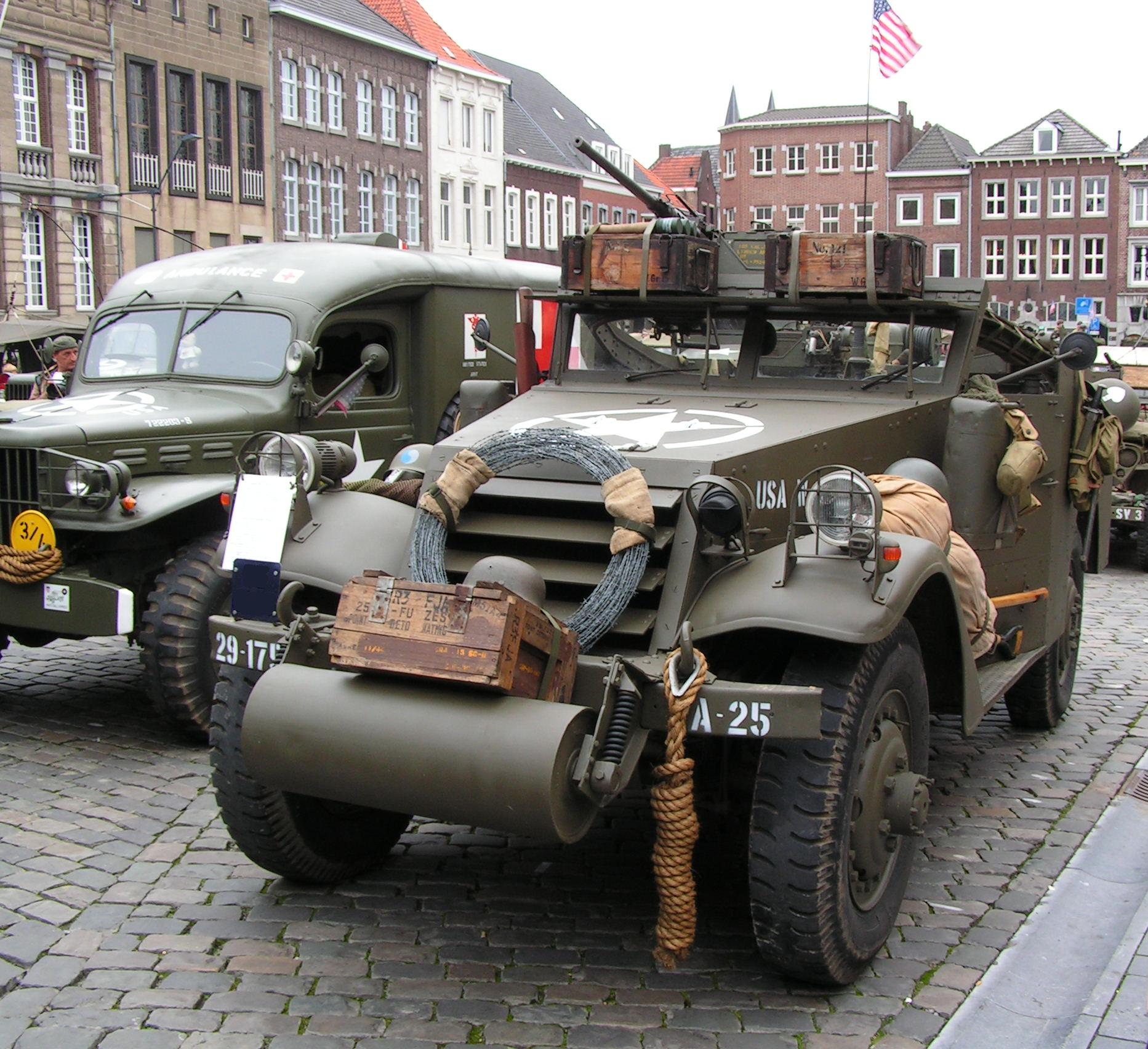
An M3 Scout Car showing the wide unditching roller at the front

An unditching roller is a device fitted to the front of military vehicles, such as the M3 Scout Car and the M3 half-track, for the purpose of preventing the vehicle from getting stuck in an obstacle, such as a ditch. The C4 based Citroën P17C Kégresse from 1931 also had such a roller.

Upon entering a ditch, the roller prevents the front of the vehicle from digging into the opposite face of the ditch; instead, the roller acts as a wide wheel enabling the front to climb out of the ditch more easily.

Variants of unditching rollers

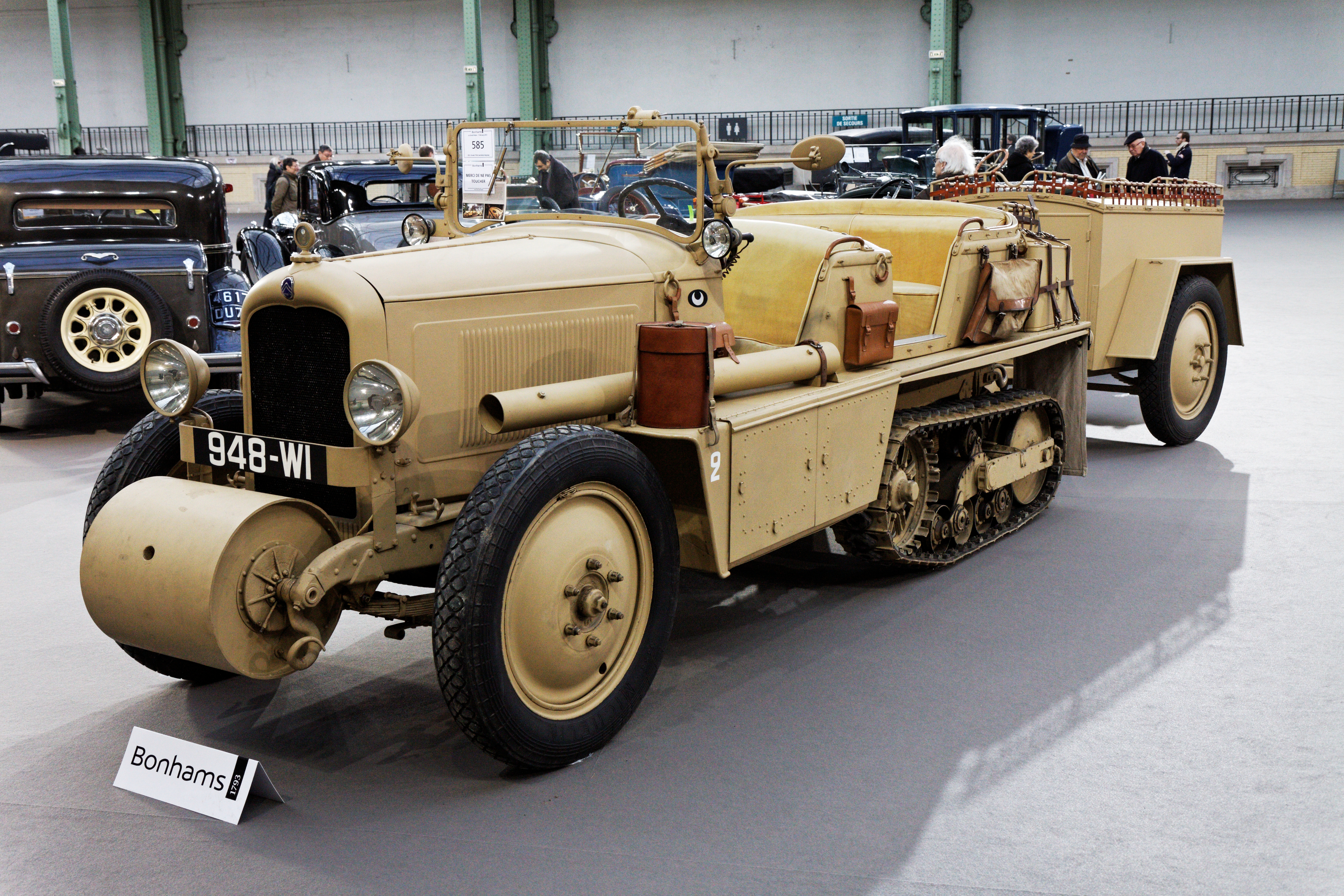
1931 C4 based Citroën P17C Kégresse

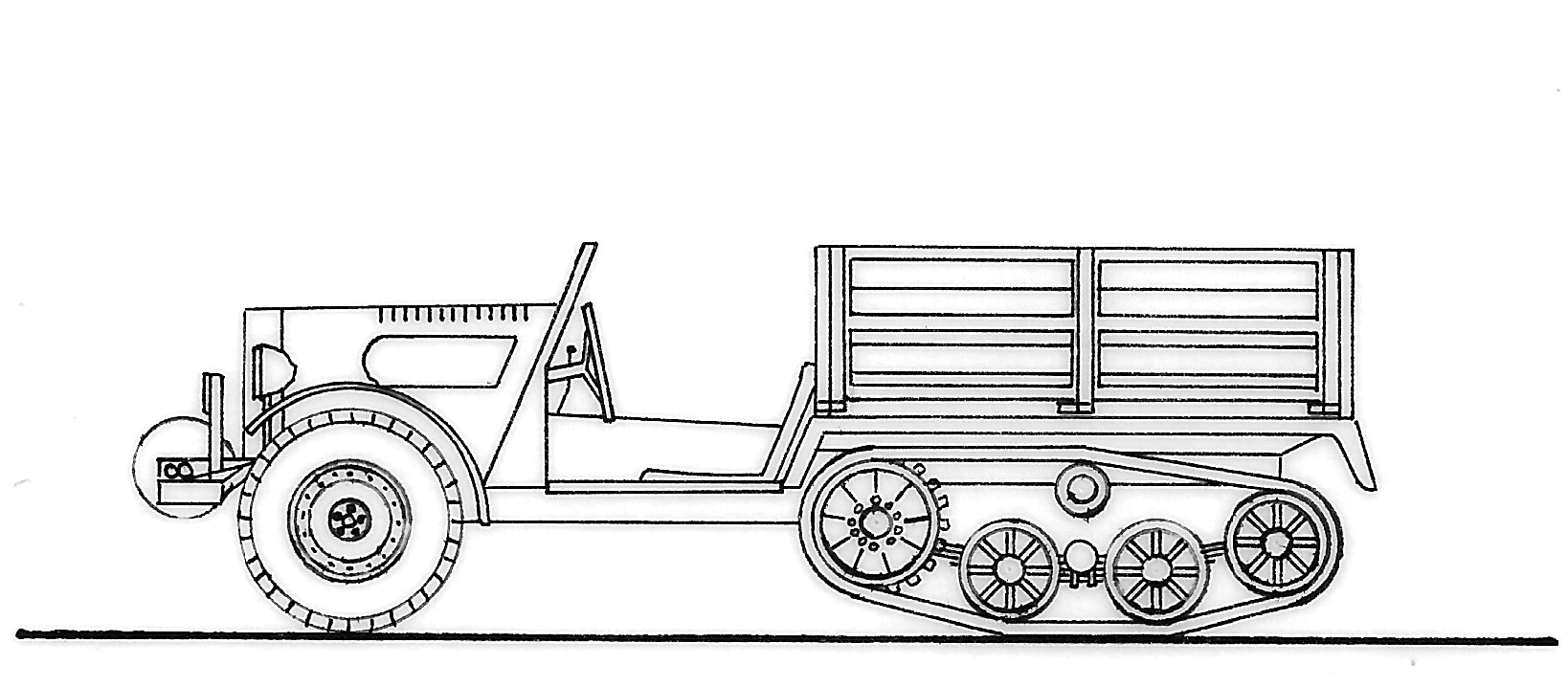
Unic TU-1 Light Artillery Tractor

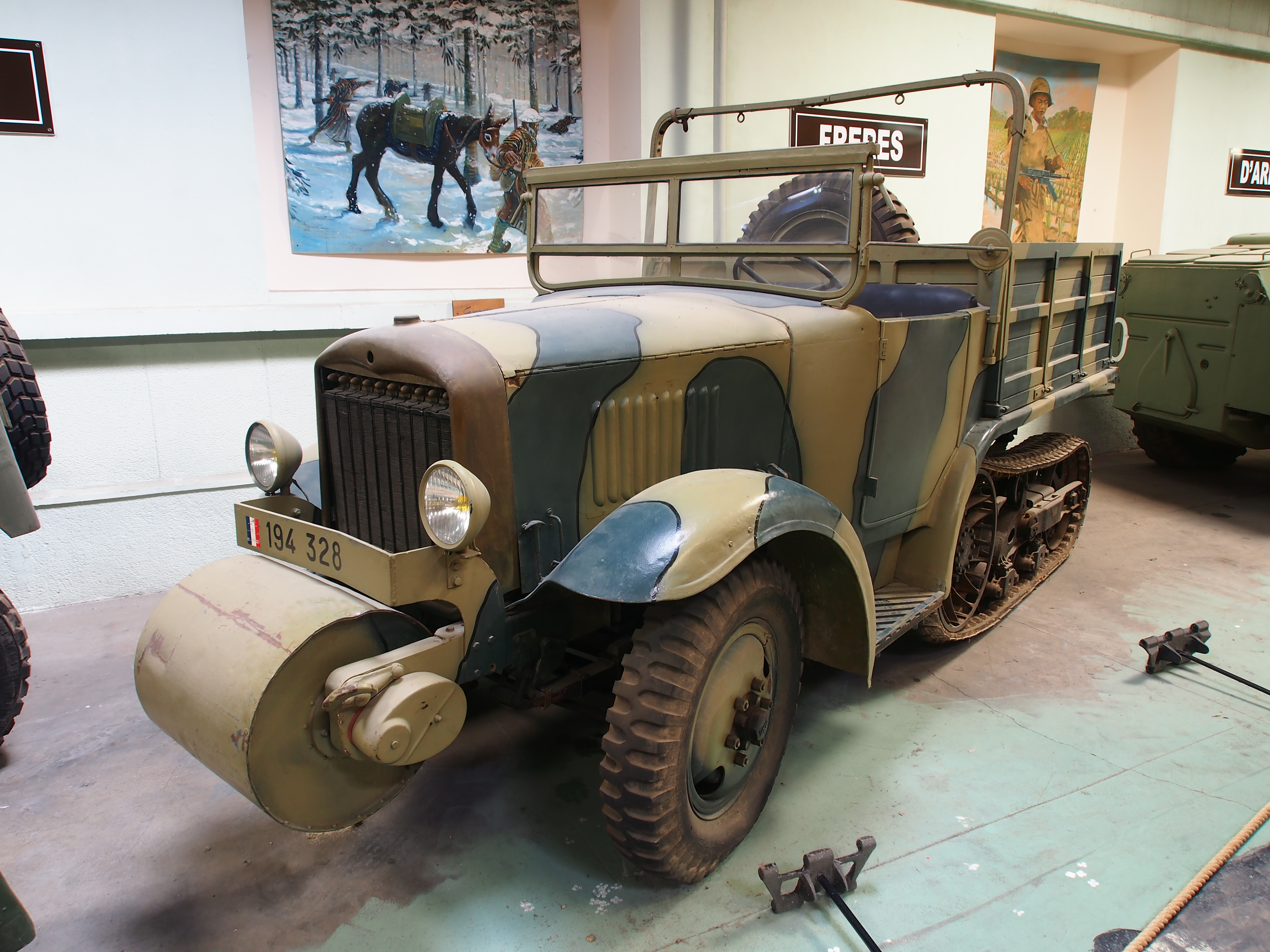
Unic P107

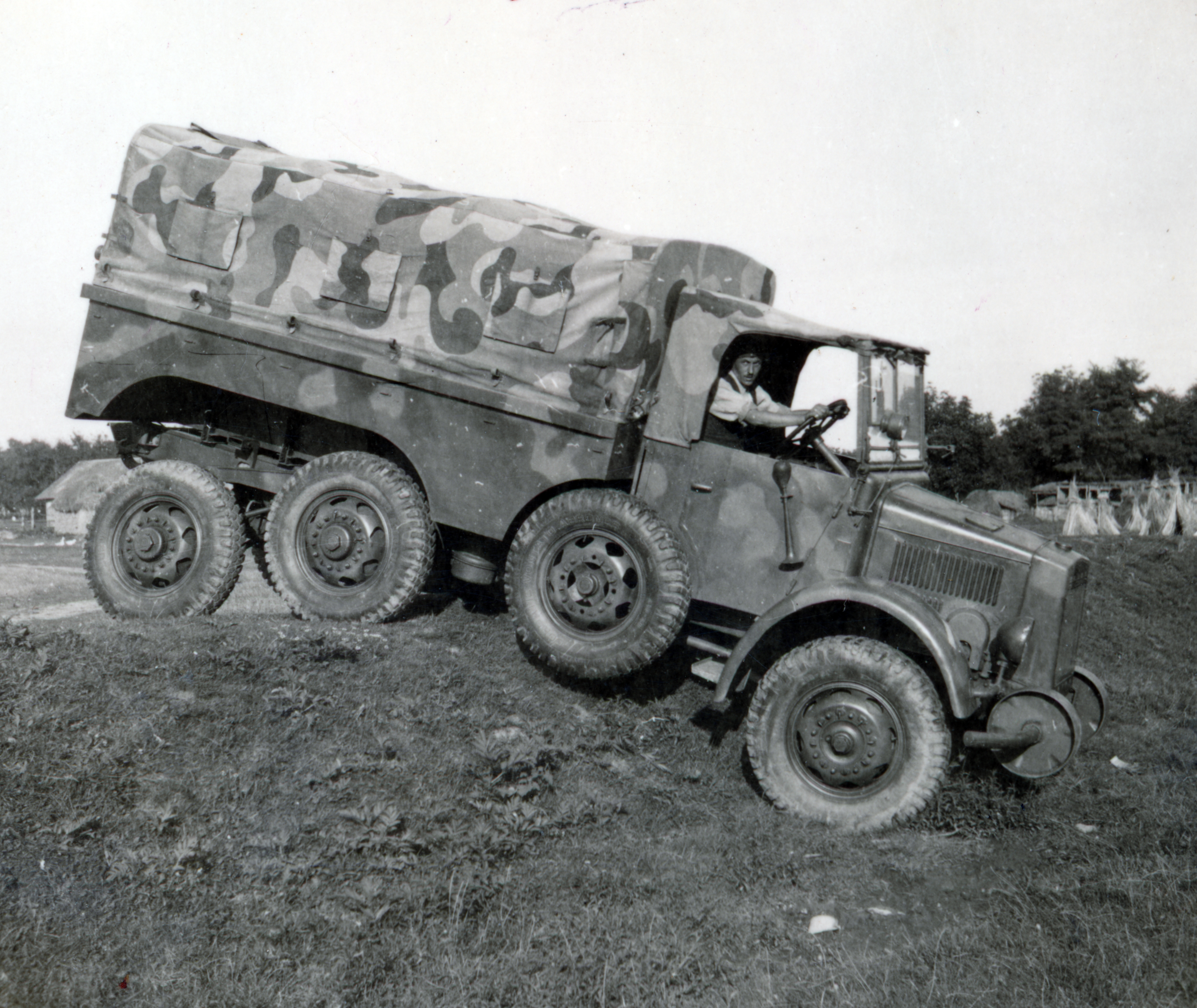
Hungarian 38M Botond

== See also ==
- Unditching beam – Military tank support device

== Bibliography ==
- Ellis, Chris (1970). Military Transport of World War I: including Vintage Vehicles and Post War Models. Poole: Blandford Press. ISBN 0-7137-0701-1.
- Zaloga, Steven J. (2006). Early US Armor: Armored Cars 1915–40. New Vanguard 254. Osprey Publishing. ISBN 9781472825148.
