= Botond (warrior) =

10th-century Hungarian warrior

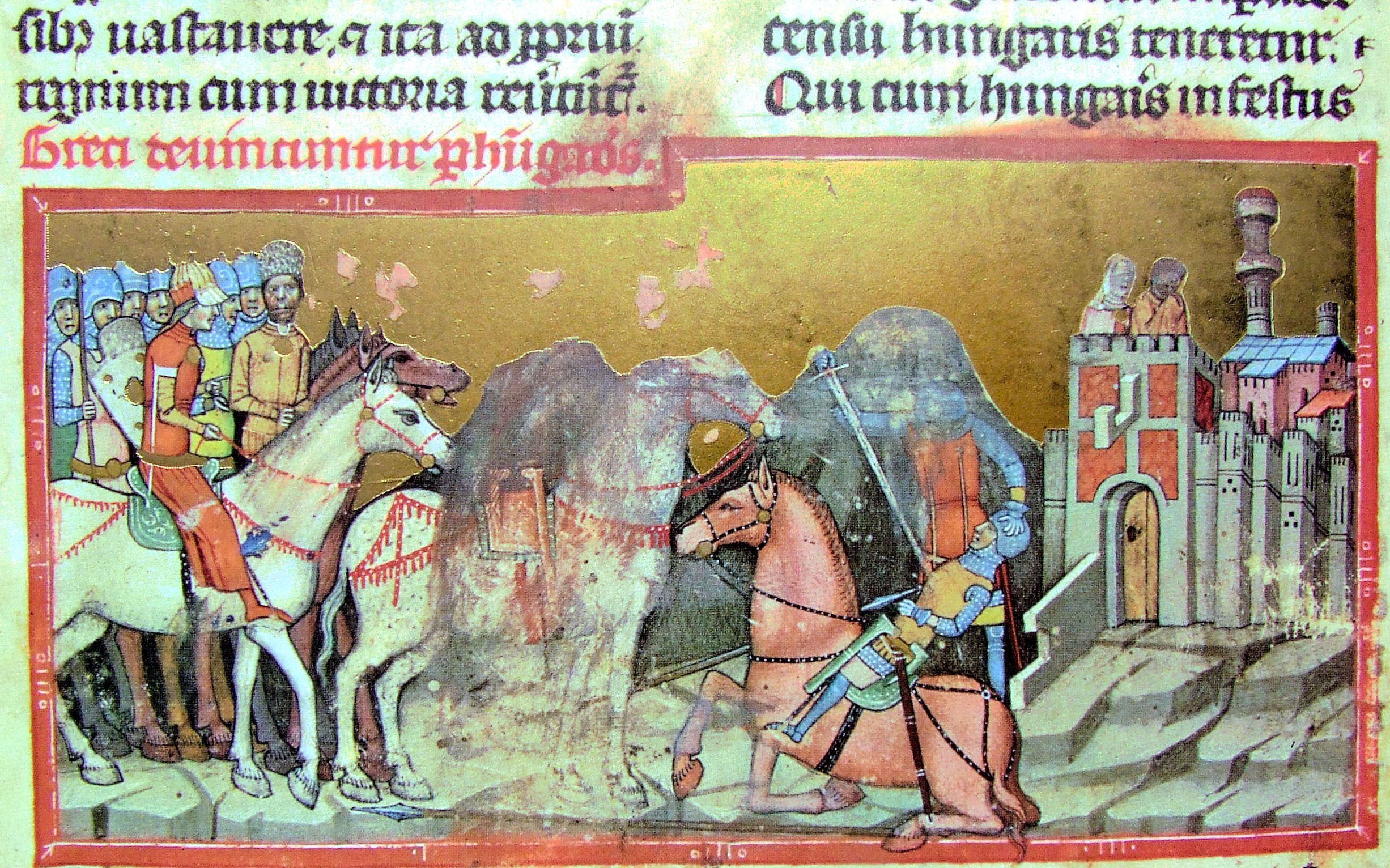
Botond defeats the Greek warrior at the wall of Constantinople as depicted in the Illuminated Chronicle

Botond (Bothond or Bontond) was a Hungarian legendary warrior and folk hero in the 10th century, a participant of the Hungarian invasions of Europe. According to a legend, he took part in a Hungarian campaign against the Byzantine Empire in 958 or 959. At the walls of Constantinople, he broke down the Golden Gate with an axe and defeated a Greek warrior in wrestling.

== Social status ==
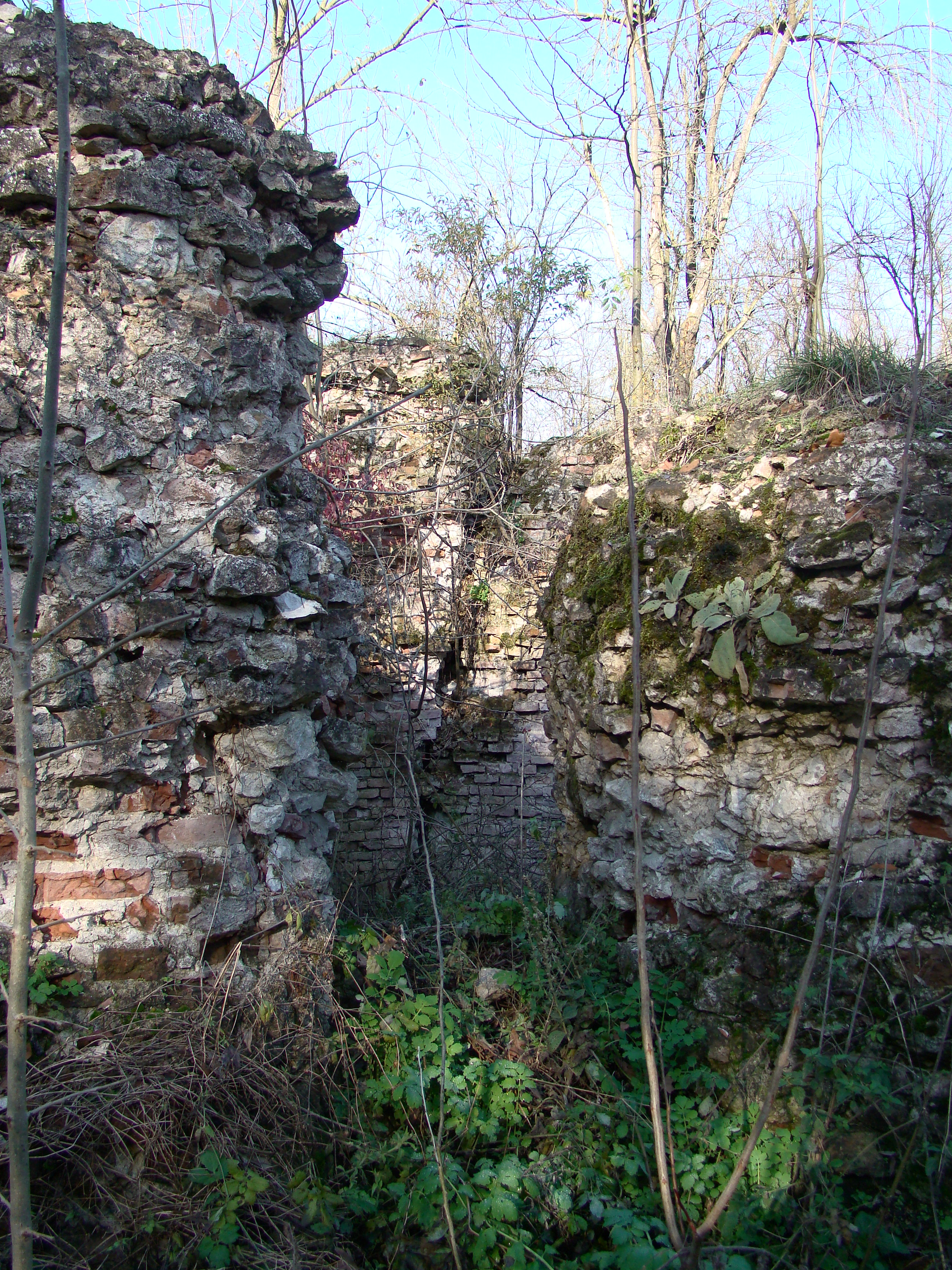
The ruins of the fort of Kupinovo, in present-day Serbia

Botond's name and deeds are preserved by narrative sources only which were compiled centuries later, therefore the circumstances of his existence and military career are unclear and questionable. The anonymous author of the Gesta Hungarorum (early 13th century) writes that Botond was a tribal chieftain, thus a member of the upper elite, whose father Kölpény (Culpun) was the uncle of Tas, one of the seven chieftains of the Magyars. Anonymus claims that Grand Prince Árpád handed over the area of Bodrog along the river Vajas in the southern lands to Tas and Kölpény during the Hungarian conquest of the Carpathian Basin (late 9th century). Accordingly, Kölpény's descendants possessed lands in the southern area of Danube–Tisza Interfluve and Bácska (Bačka).

Contrary to Anonymus, Simon of Kéza states in his Gesta Hunnorum et Hungarorum (early 1280s) that Botond was a common Hungarian soldier who "was chosen to wrestle" the Greek warrior. The 14th-century Illuminated Chronicle, which derives Simon's work, also strengthens this; according to its narration, Botond says that "I am Botond, a proper Hungarian, the least of the Hungarians" (Latin: Ego, inquit, sum Bothond, rectus Hungarus, minimus Hungarorum), while accepting the Greek's challenge. In this context, the phrase minimus Hungarorum indicates both his small stature and lowly origin.

According to scholar Zoltán Tóth, Botond's lower social status is confirmed by the fact that his descendants (see below) were belonged to the relatively poor nobles centuries later. Tóth argued that Kölpény's name is similar to Kül-Bey, one of the tribes of the Pechenegs and this reflects his origin. His name is preserved in place names and castle ruins in present-day Serbia, for instance, Kulpin (Hungarian: Kölpény) and Kupinovo (Hungarian: Szávakölpény), which territory corresponds Anonymus' information. According to linguist Dezső Pais, Botond's name derives from a Turkic verb butan meaning "to beat, defend". However, as the word bot ("rod, stick") was also used in Hungarian for mace, a favorite weapon of the Pechenegs, and thus strengthens the theory of Botond's ethnicity; in addition, as Tóth argued, the legend itself could be of nomadic, Pecheneg origin too. However, further etymological ideas exist too. Other historians argue that Anonymus fabricated a personal patronymic name from Botond's possible Kölpény or Kylfing ethnicity, who were hired as frontier guards by the Hungarian grand princes in the 10th century. Bálint Hóman accepted Anonymus' narration that Botond was a member of the Hungarian elite. He claimed that his tribal territory laid in the area of Drava. Gyula Moravcsik also considered that all Hungarian invasions southward since the 950s were managed by Botond's tribe, whose territory laid in Baranya.

== In narratives ==
=== Botond's legend ===
The ring had already been prepared when Botond seized the battle-axe he used to carry, ran up to the metal gate of the city, and, according to the story, with one blow of his axe opened such a rent in the gate that the Greeks never after attempted to mend this marvel. After this Botond walked unarmed to the wrestling ring. The two sides gathered to watch, the Hungarians on their horses and the Greeks on the battlements. The Greek emerged from the city and started for the ring. When he saw Botond waiting alone for him, he asked in surprise why he hadn't brought another Hungarian to fight beside him. Hereupon, the story goes, the Greek made a lunge, but Botond grabbed hold of him, a struggle ensued, and in no time the Greek was flat on the ground, quite unable to get up again. [...] Although the defeated Greek survived with only a broken arm, the wrestling match led to his death.

— Simon of Kéza: The Deeds of the Hungarians

He [the Greek warrior] moved the Hungarians to exceeding wrath, and they found one man to oppose him. Facing his adversary, he spoke thus to the Greek: "I am Botond, a proper Hungarian, the least of the Hungarians. Fetch two more Greeks, one to care for your soul when it shall take its flight, the other for the burying of your carcass, for most surely I shall make the emperor of the Greeks tributary to my people." Then the captain of the Hungarians, Apor by name, who by common will had been placed in command of the army, ordered Botond to take his axe and go up to the city gate, which was of metal, and on that gate to prove with what strength he could wield his axe. Coming up to the gate, he is said to have struck a blow which split the gate so wide that a boy of five years would have had enough room to go in and out. While he provided this spectacle for the Hungarians and the Greeks, a space was made ready for the combat outside the city gate; and after they had fought but a short while, the Greek was thrown to the ground by the Hungarian and there he at once breathed his last.

— Illuminated Chronicle

Majority of scholars considered that the Hungarians launched an invasion against the Byzantine Empire in the spring of 958 or 959, because Emperor Constantine VII ceased the payment of regular tribute in the previous year. Simon of Kéza writes the campaign in the direction of Balkans was led by Taksony, the grand prince himself, while the Illuminated Chronicle refers to Apor as commander ("captain") of the Hungarian army. The Theophanes Continuatus narrates that a Hungarian campaign began at Easter, during which a Hungarian army penetrated as far as Byzantium and gained much booty. Constantine sent his general, patrikios Pothos Argyros, with an army against them. The Byzantines attacked the Hungarians at night and slaughtered them, recovering the booty. Hungarian historiography connected this narration to the Apor-led campaign where Botond's heroism took place. The Hungarian chronicles say that the Hungarians marched to Bulgaria, advancing as far as Adrianopolis (present-day Edirne). The Hungarians met no resistance, and thus reached the gates of Constantinople, where they camped along the wall. The Illuminated Chronicle even states that the Hungarians laid siege to the city.

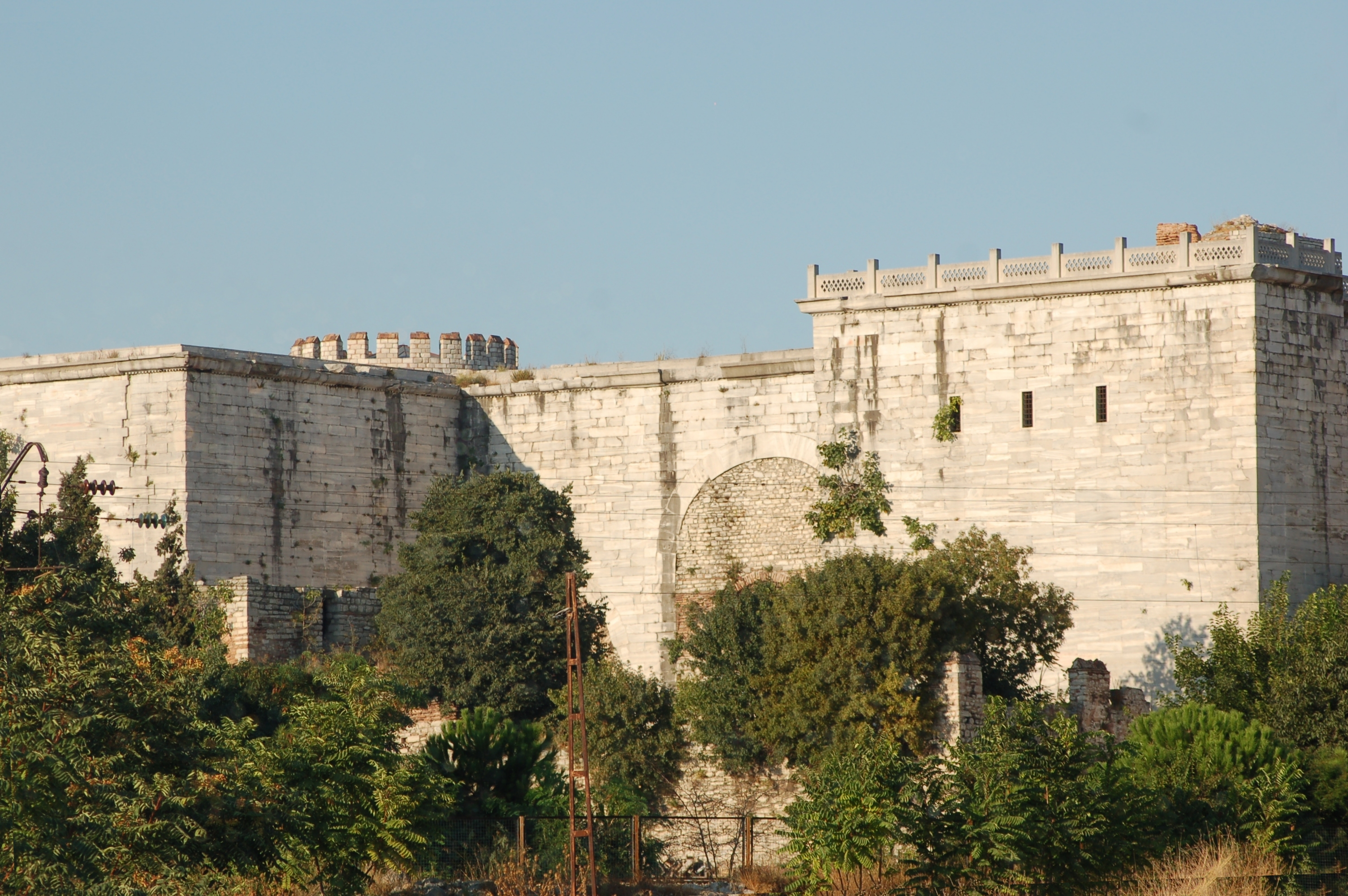
The remains of the Golden Gate in present-day Istanbul, Turkey)

The Byzantines sent out a Greek warrior of "gigantic stature", who asked for two Hungarians to meet him in combat, and if he did not defeat them both, Emperor Constantine should become tributary to the Hungarians. Simon of Kéza explicitly writes of wrestling, saying the Greek "offered were that if he could not throw both Hungarians to the ground, then Greece [Byzantium] would submit to the Hungarians and pay tribute. Meanwhile, the Greek warrior "endlessly harassed" the Hungarians. Simon of Kéza says that Botond "was chosen to wrestle him" alone, while the Illuminated Chronicle narrates that the Greek warrior "moved the Hungarians to exceeding wrath, and they found one man to oppose him", who was Botond. Elemér Mályusz argued that the method of fighting (wrestling) confirms that the story of Botond was spread primarily among the people, since wrestling was a "fighting manner of peasants", instead of knightly duel. Mályusz considered that the fight (a giant against a small-sized warrior) reflects well the relations of the Byzantine Empire with the neighboring Eurasian nomads in the 10th century. Both chronicle emphasize that following Botond's victory over the Greek warrior, Constantine and his wife Helena Lekapene, along with their court escort, who watched the fight standing upon the city battlements, "felt great shame, and turning away their faces they went into the palace". Despite that the Hungarians demanded the tribute in vain, Constantine "answered them with a smile and nothing more" or "laughed at the demanded tribute". Thereafter, the Hungarians lifted the siege and plundered and laid waste "whole of Greece and Bulgaria", i.e. the surrounding lands of the empire, "carrying away from it gold, jewels and flocks beyond numbering".

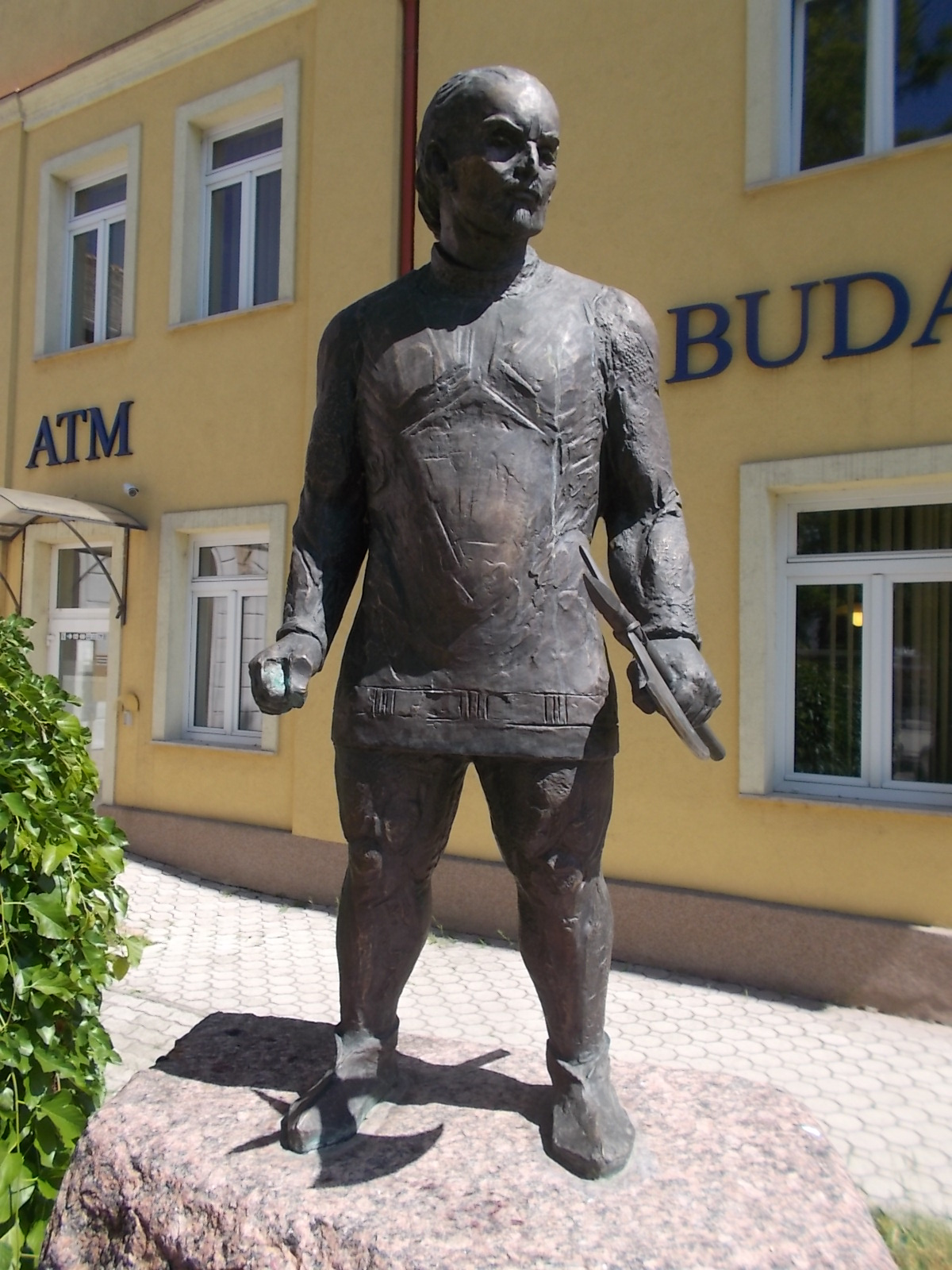
A modern-day statue of Botond in Bicske, Hungary

Most historians accepted Anonymus' narration regarding the identification of Golden Gate (Medieval Greek: Χρυσεία Πύλη), which situated at the south end of the land walls and was the main ceremonial entrance into the city. Simon of Kéza, probably unaware of the gate's existence, was skeptical and diminished the gate to "metal" or "ore", which was taken over by the Illuminated Chronicle too. Moravcsik argued the crushing of the Golden Gate meant the ceremonial proclamation of war against the Byzantine Empire, since Krum thrust his spear into the gate decades ago, in 813. Botond carried out this action with an axe or mace (Latin: dolabrum; dolabra), which tore a hole in the gate. His act meant the "symbolic rape of the city". Zoltán Tóth argued that mace was a favorite weapon of the Pechenegs, which confirms Botond's ethnicity. According to him, the warrior became Hungarian over the centuries, as the text of the legend changed.

Loránd Szilágyi argued that the epic poem which narrates Botond's heroism survived as an internal tradition of his namesake clan. Elemér Mályusz considered that Botond's legend, due to its subject and archaic nature, is of 10th-century origin. It is one of the few contemporary Hungarian legends where a simple representative of the people plays the main role instead of a ruler or a warlord. During his bravery, Botond does not seek glory and wealth for himself, but for his nation. Henrik Marczali emphasized the story has been preserved in folk poetry over the centuries, without significant changes, and is full of pagan tradition, which explains the skepticism of Latin-language historiography. Mályusz suggested the Botond legend was preserved by chronicler Ákos during his redaction of the original Hungarian chronicle text in the mid-13th century. Marczali argued that there were attempts to merge Botond's story with the Bavarian legendary character of Poto the Brave in the mid-11th century. Zoltán Tóth claimed the gens Győr was the centre of this attempt, whose lands laid along the western frontier, where formerly the Pecheneg auxiliary tribes were settled. However, Botond's story must have been so widespread by then that this could not have been possible (since Anonymus also had to mention it in a single sentence) and Botond became the symbol and "soul of the people", who was "embodiment of the Hungarian people, ready for war, not afraid of trouble or danger, maintaining the glory and honor of the nation against anyone, not receiving recognition for their great deeds, but not expecting it either". Tóth considered that Botond's wrestling with the Greek only became part of the legend later (before that, smashing the gate was the dominant scene), with the failed intention of merging the character with Poto. The original version gradually faded with the Magyarization of the settling Pechenegs in the second half of the 12th century. Tóth emphasized that Botond's legend embodies the former wish of the Pechenegs to take Constantinople. Historians János B. Szabó and Balázs Sugár argued that Simon of Kéza and the Illuminated Chronicle recorded two different variants of the same traditional core, which may have originated from the Pannonian Avars, who besieged Constantinople in 626.

=== Gesta Hungarorum ===
Some indeed say that they reached Constantinople and that Botond cut the Golden Gate of Constantinople with his axe. But as I have found this in no book written by historians, and have heard it only in the spurious tales of peasants, I do not, therefore, propose to write it in the present work.

— Anonymus: The Deeds of the Hungarians

Anonymus placed Botond's military career to the time of the Hungarian conquest at the turn of the 9th and 10th centuries. As one of the commanders of the Hungarian army, Botond took part in the military campaign against Duke Salan, as the chronicler writes in the Gesta Hungarorum. He frequently appears in the work in the companion of chieftains Lehel (the son of Tas) and Bulcsú. They altogether crossed Sava to defeat Salan and his allies, the Byzantines. Anonymus placed the Botond legend to this period, but remained highly skeptical. Thereafter, they captured forts in Slavonia, including Zagreb, Požega and Vukovar. The Gesta Hungarorum says when the child Zolta succeeded his father Árpád as grand prince in 907, Bulcsú, Lehel and Botond – who "were warlike men, brave in spirit, whose concern was none other than to conquer peoples for their lord and lay waste the realms of others " – fought in Carinthia and Lombardy, plundering Padua. Anonymus claims that Botond participated in the Battle of the Inn in 913, where the Hungarians were defeated and, as the chronicler erroneously writes, Bulcsú and Lehel were executed. Botond survived the battle and together with his warriors he "bravely and manfully stood ground". Botond returned to Hungary where Zolta decided to launch as a campaign against Otto the Great to avenge the deaths of Bulcsú and Lehel. He appointed Botond, Szabolcs and Örkény (Urkund) to lead the Hungarian armies to the Kingdom of Italy and East Francia, plundering and looting vast territories. After the victory, Botond returned home where he, "worn out by the long travail of war, began strangely to weaken, passed from the world and was buried by the Verőce River" (today Virovitica, Croatia).

Botond's name does not appear in contemporary sources (Western or Byzantine), therefore most historians consider the career path provided by Anonymus above to be a complete fabrication. Later chroniclers also omitted to mention these details, because they did not believe its authenticity. Henrik Marczali argued that Anonymus significantly enlarged Botond's role, gave him lineage, but could not link him to an ancient clan, and despite his victories, he did not receive any of the estates from Árpád or Zolta, unlike the other chieftains. Marczali argued that the Botond tradition had existed since the second half of the 10th century, but since he had no notable descendants, the legend could not develop further. Anonymus borrowed his name from oral tradition and folklore, and arbitrarily included him among the chieftains of the conquest era. Elemér Mályusz considered that Anonymus made a futile attempt to reserve and expropriate Botond's memory for the ruling elite, as he was unable to obscure his character due to his prevalence.

== Descendants ==
Botond's descendants, the namesake Botond (Bochond) clan possessed lands in the region between the rivers Drava and Sava, which corresponds to the information of Anonymus. By the mid-13th century, they were relatively poor belonging to the lesser nobility.

Sophia, the widow of Matthew from the clan demanded her daughters' quarter – the estate Ködmen or Kudmen in Virovitica County (near present-day Široko Polje) – from Thomas and Peter, the brothers of the late File Miskolc, who was granted the land from Duke Coloman prior to that. Lack of territorial jurisdiction, Palatine Roland Rátót passed the case on to the Slavonian nobles, who dismissed Sophia's claim. In 1255, Sophia and her two sons Csépán and Mynkus demanded a portion from the land Kudmen, which they believe the late Matthew had previously purchased. The litigants agreed before the cathedral chapter of Pécs, Thomas and Peter Miskolc bought the portion for 10 marks from Sophia and her sons.

It is possible that a certain noble named Botond, who lived in Bács and Valkó counties in 1231, was also a descendant of the 10th-century warrior. His mother owned a portion in Szond (today Sonta, Serbia) in that year.

== Legacy ==
Hungarian military all-terrain truck 38M Botond, designed in 1938, was named after him.

== Sources ==
=== Primary sources ===
- Anonymus, Notary of King Béla: The Deeds of the Hungarians (Edited, Translated and Annotated by Martyn Rady and László Veszprémy) (2010). In: Rady, Martyn; Veszprémy, László; Bak, János M. (2010); Anonymus and Master Roger; CEU Press; ISBN 978-963-9776-95-1.
- Simon of Kéza: The Deeds of the Hungarians (Edited and translated by László Veszprémy and Frank Schaer with a study by Jenő Szűcs) (1999). CEU Press. ISBN 963-9116-31-9.
- Bak, János M.; Veszprémy, László; Kersken, Norbert (2018). Chronica de gestis Hungarorum e codice picto saec. XIV [The Illuminated Chronicle: Chronicle of the deeds of the Hungarians from the fourteenth-century illuminated codex]. Budapest: Central European University Press. ISBN 978-9-6338-6264-3.

=== Secondary sources ===
- B. Szabó, János; Sudár, Balázs (2025). "Botond(ok). Egy hős arcai – és a hazai tudomány [Botond(s). Faces of a Hero – and the Hungarian Research]". Hadtörténelmi Közlemények (in Hungarian). 138 (2). Hadtörténeti Intézet és Múzeum: 275–312. ISSN 0017-6540.
- Herényi, István (1971). "Bulcsu nemzetségének nyári szállása az Árpádok korában [The Summer Residence of Bulcsú's Kindred during the Age of Árpáds]". Századok (in Hungarian). 105 (2). Magyar Történelmi Társulat: 355–386. ISSN 0039-8098.
- Karácsonyi, János (1900). A magyar nemzetségek a XIV. század közepéig. [The Hungarian genera until the middle of the 14th century] (in Hungarian). Hungarian Academy of Sciences.
- Kordé, Zoltán (1994). "Botond". In Kristó, Gyula; Engel, Pál; Makk, Ferenc (eds.). Korai magyar történeti lexikon (9-14. század) [Encyclopedia of the Early Hungarian History (9th-14th centuries)] (in Hungarian). Akadémiai Kiadó. p. 125. ISBN 963-05-6722-9.
- Marczali, Henrik (1916). "A Botond-monda történeti kapcsolatai [The Historical Relations of the Botond Legend]". Akadémiai Értesítő (in Hungarian). 27. Hungarian Academy of Sciences: 90–100. ISSN 1588-2721.
- Mályusz, Elemér (1971). Az V. István-kori geszta [The Gesta of the Age of Stephen V]. Akadémiai Kiadó.
- Moravcsik, Gyula (1953). Bizánc és a magyarság [Byzantium and the Hungarians] (PDF) (in Hungarian). Budapest, Hungary: Akadémiai Kiadó.
- Tóth, Sándor László (2015). A magyar törzsszövetség politikai életrajza [A Political Biography of the Hungarian Tribal Federation] (in Hungarian). Belvedere Meridionale. ISBN 978-615-5372-39-1.
- Tóth, Zoltán (1988). "A Botond-monda eredete s az anonymusi Botond-hagyomány [The Origin of the Botond Legend and Anonymus' Botond Tradition]". Hadtörténelmi Közlemények (in Hungarian). 101 (3). Hadtörténeti Intézet és Múzeum: 467–483. ISSN 0017-6540.
