= Unditching beam =

Military tank support device

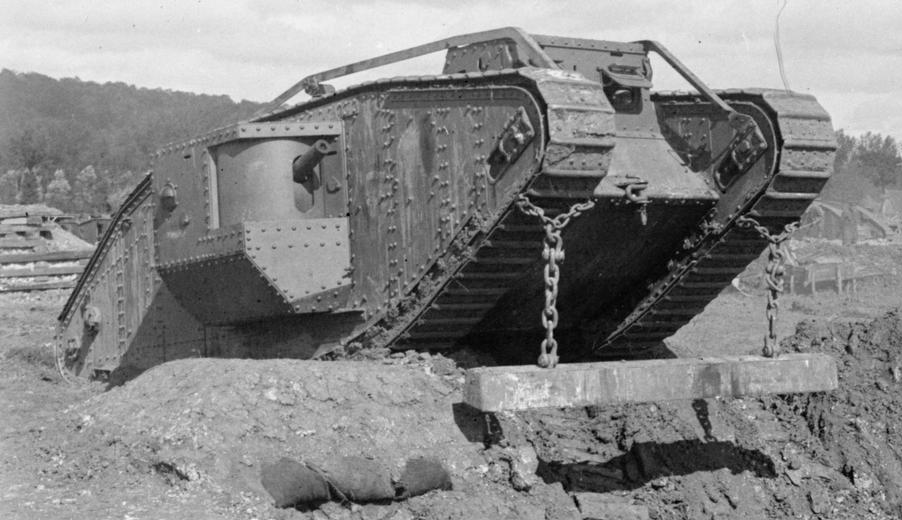
Mark IV tank with unditching beam

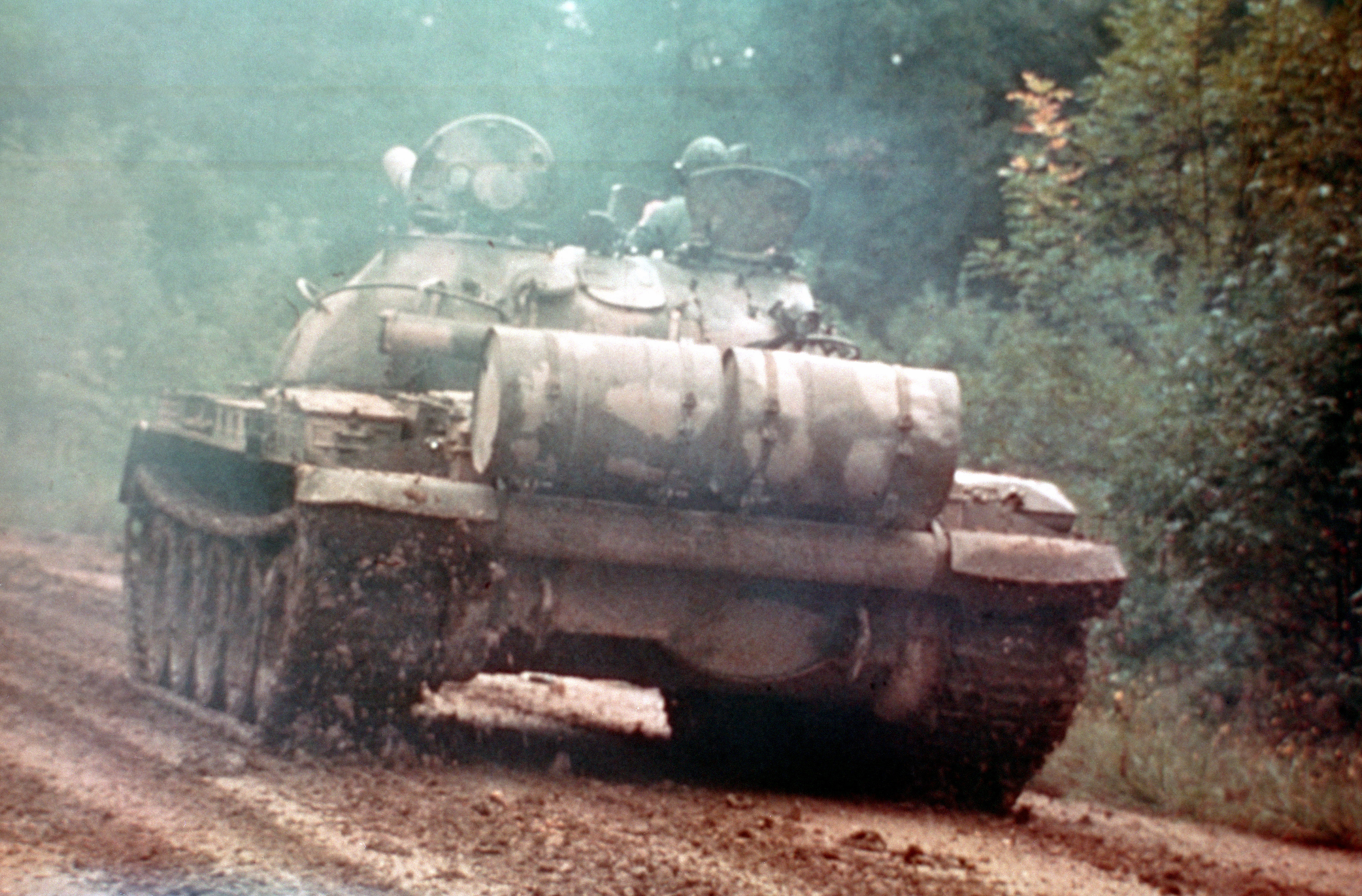
T-62A tank with unditching beam

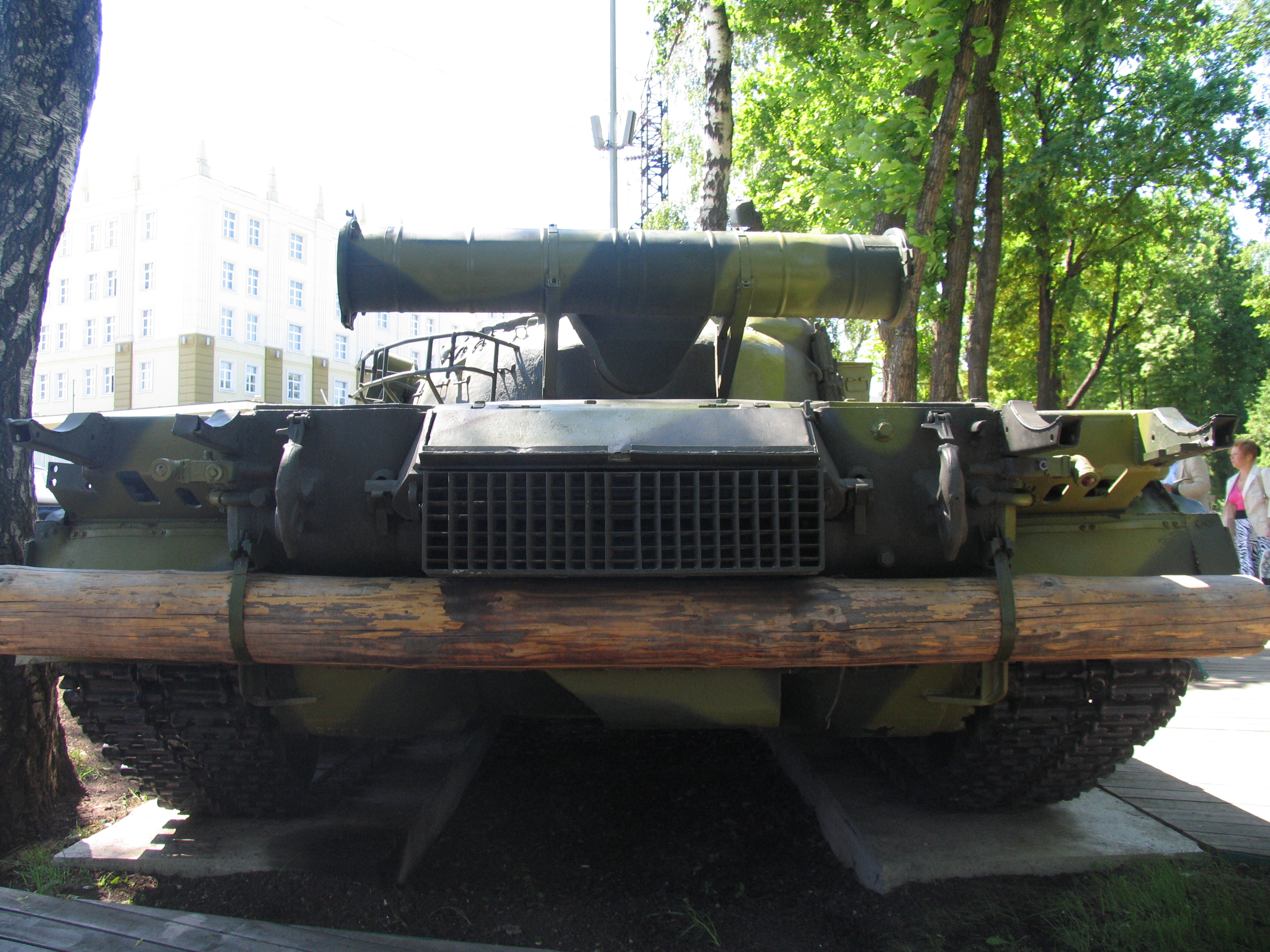
T-80 tank with unditching beam

An unditching beam is a device that is used to aid in the recovery of armoured fighting vehicles when they become bogged or "ditched". The device is a beam that is attached to the continuous tracks, providing additional traction for the vehicle to extricate itself from a ditch or from boggy conditions.

The unditching beam was first introduced into service during World War I with the British Mark IV tank. It is believed the device was designed by Philip Johnson, who was serving as an engineering officer at the British Army's depot at Érin; originally the device weighed one-half long ton (1,100 pounds; 510 kilograms) and was constructed of a solid beam of oak with two large steel plates bolted to two sides to provide protection. When not in use, it was stowed on two rails mounted on the roof of the tank that ran the entire length of the vehicle. When employed, the beam was chained to the tank's tracks, giving the vehicle something firm to drive over.

Unditching beams remain a commonly-carried standard ancillary on a number of Russian-produced armoured fighting vehicles.

== See also ==
- Unditching roller – Military vehicle support device
