= Mark IV tank =

British WWI Tank

Mark IV
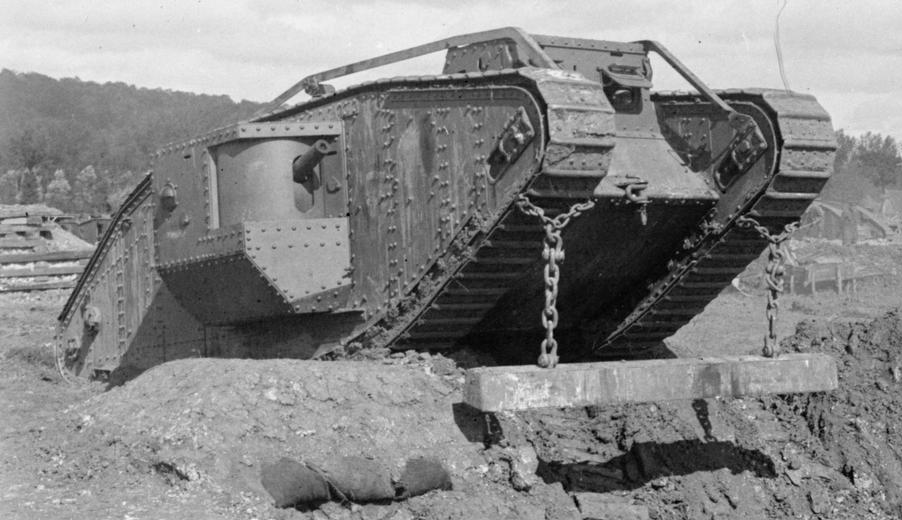
- Mark IV male with unditching beam deployed
- Type: Heavy tank
- Place of origin: United Kingdom

Service history
- Used by: British Army; Imperial German Army (captured); Reichswehr; Imperial Japanese Army
- Wars: First World War; German Revolution of 1918–19

Production history
- Designer: Walter Gordon Wilson; William Tritton
- Manufacturer: see text
- Unit cost: about £5,000
- Produced: May 1917 – end 1918
- No. built: 1,220

Specifications
- Mass: 28 tons (28.4 tonnes); Female: 27 tons (27.4 tonnes)
- Length: 26 ft 5 in (8.05 m)
- Width: Male: 13 ft 6 in (4.12 m)
- Crew: 8
- Armour: 0.5 inches (12 mm)
- Main armament: Male: 2× 6-pounder (57-mm) 6 cwt QF guns with 332 rounds Female: 5× .303 Lewis guns
- Secondary armament: Male: 3× .303 in Lewis guns
- Engine: Daimler-Foster, 6-cylinder in-line sleeve valve 16 litre petrol engine 105 bhp at 1,000 rpm
- Transmission: Primary: 2 Forward, 1 Reverse; Secondary – 2 speed
- Fuel capacity: 70 Imperial gallons
- Operational range: 35 mi (56 km)
- Maximum speed: 4 mph (6.4 km/h)

The Mark IV (pronounced Mark four) was a British tank of the First World War. Introduced in 1917, it benefited from significant developments of the Mark I tank (the intervening designs being small batches used for training). The main improvements were in armour, the re-siting of the fuel tank and ease of transport. Armour was increased to resist the German armour-piercing bullet, the drivetrain was strengthened and side turrets were constructed so that they could be swung inside, enabling travel by train (previously they had to be separately transported to the battlefield by truck).

A total of 1,220 Mark IVs were built: 420 "Males", 595 "Females" and 205 Tank Tenders (unarmed vehicles used to carry supplies), which made it the most numerous British tank of the war. The Mark IV was first used in mid 1917 at the Battle of Messines Ridge. It remained in British service until the end of the war, and a small number served briefly with other combatants afterwards.

== Development ==
The director of the Tank Supply Department, Albert Gerald Stern, first intended to fit the Mark IV with a new engine and transmission. Production of battle tanks was halted until the new design was ready, necessitating the use of the Mark II and III as interim training tanks. Failing to complete development soon enough to start production in time to have 200 tanks ready for the promised date of 1 April 1917, Stern was ultimately forced to take a Mark IV into production in May 1917 that was only slightly different from the Mark I tank.

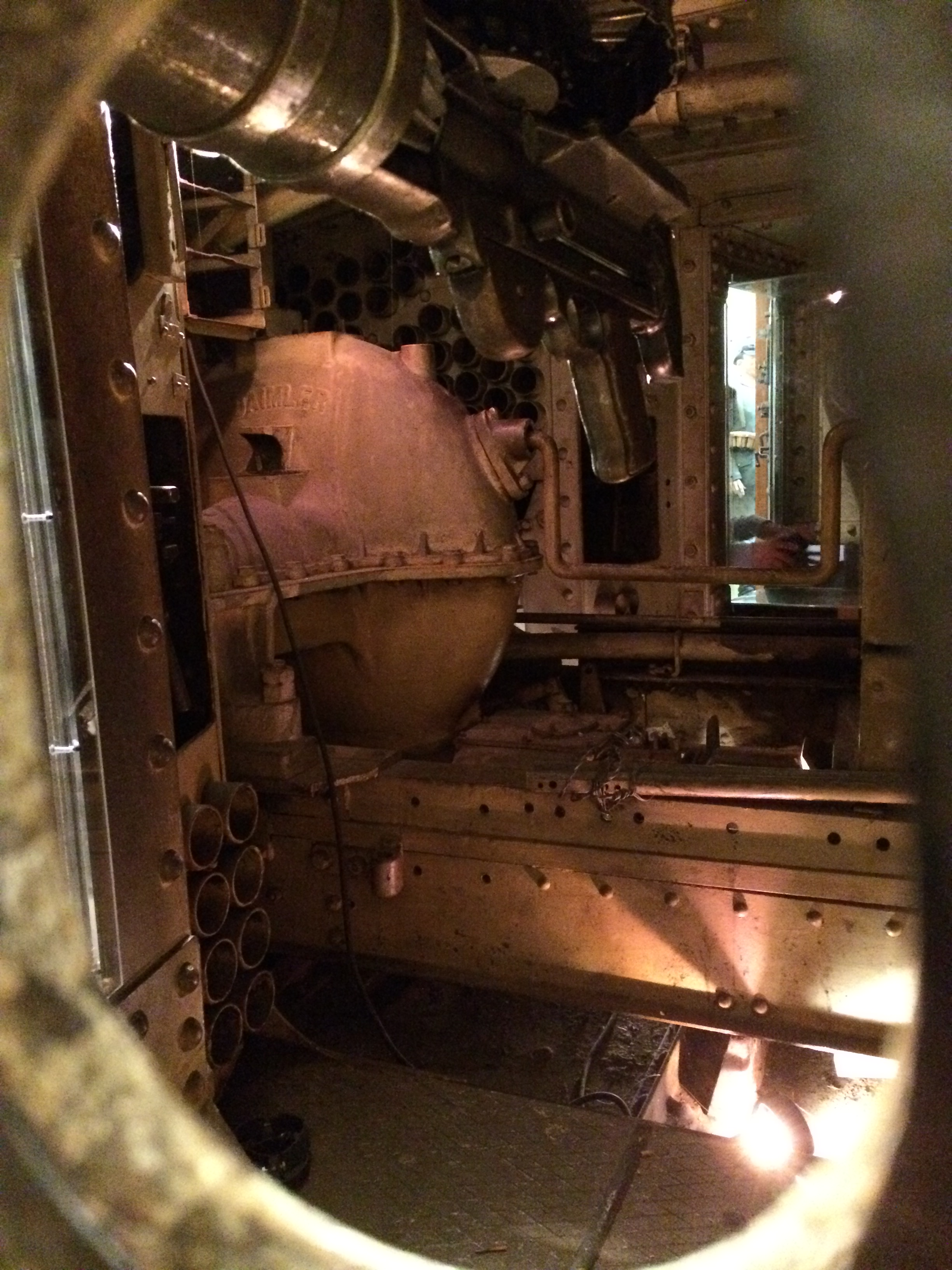
The inside of a Mark IV seen through a peephole on the starboard sponson. One machine gun is visible at the forefront above.

The Mark IV Male initially carried three Lewis machine guns – one in the cab front and one in each sponson (Note: A spare Lewis gun was carried on board) – and a QF 6 pdr 6 cwt gun in each sponson, with its barrel shortened as it had been found that the longer original was apt to strike obstacles or dig into the ground. The sponsons were not mirror images of each other, as their configuration differed to allow for the 6 pdr's gun-layer operating his gun from the left and the loader serving the gun from the right. The guns had a 100 degree arc of fire but only the starboard gun could fire straight ahead. The Female had five Lewis guns but no 6-pounders.

The decision to standardise on the Lewis gun was due to the space available within the tanks. Despite its vulnerable barrel and a tendency to overheat or foul after prolonged firing, the Lewis had the advantage that it used compact pan magazines which could hold up to 96 rounds. The Hotchkiss was fed from a rigid strip which was trimmed down to only 14 rounds for tank use; no sooner had the machine gunner guided the fall of shot onto the target than it was time to change the strip and the process repeated. It was not until a flexible 50 round strip was fully developed in May 1917 that the Hotchkiss would become the standard machine gun for tanks again. The changes caused delays, such as adapting the design for the bulky Lewis cooling barrel, and later, problems when the Hotchkiss strips had to be stored in positions designed for Lewis gun magazines.

At the 1917 Battle of Cambrai, Mark IV tanks were equipped with fascines, bundles of brushwood bound with chains, about 10 ft (3.0 m) long and 4 ft 6 in (1.37 m) in diameter carried on the roof of the cab. They were dropped into trenches to allow the tank to cross over more easily.

A large number of these tanks were also used for development work. In an attempt to improve trench-crossing capability, the "tadpole tail", an extension to the rear track horns, was introduced. However, it proved insufficiently rigid and does not appear to have been used in combat. Other experimental versions tested radios, mortars placed between the rear horns, and recovery cranes. Some of these devices were later used on operational tanks. Mark IVs were also the first tanks fitted with "unditching beams" by field workshops. A large wooden beam, reinforced with sheet metal, was stored across the top of the tank on a set of parallel rails. If the tank became stuck, the beam was attached to the tracks (often under fire) and then the tracks would drag it beneath the vehicle, providing grip.

- Crew: 8
- Combat weight:
  - Male: 28 tons (28.4 tonnes)
  - Female: 27 tons (27.4 tonnes)
- Armour: 0.25–0.47 in (6.1–12 mm)
- Armament: Three machine guns and two 6-pdrs (Male), Five .303 Lewis light machine guns (Female)
- Ammunition storage: 6 pounder: 180 HE rounds and remainder Case

== Production ==
The Mark IV was built by six manufacturers: Metropolitan (the majority builder), Fosters of Lincoln, Armstrong-Whitworth, Coventry Ordnance Works, William Beardmore & Company and Mirrlees, Watson & Co., with the main production being in 1917. The first order was placed for 1,000 tanks with Metropolitan in August 1916. It was then cancelled, reinstated and then modified between August and December 1916. The other manufacturers, contracted for no more than 100 tanks each, were largely immune to the conflict between Stern and the War Office.

== Service ==
The Mark IV was first used in large numbers on 7 June 1917, during the British assault on Messines Ridge. Crossing dry but heavily cratered terrain, many of the 60-plus Mark IVs lagged behind the infantry, but several made important contributions to the battle. By comparison, at the Third Battle of Ypres (also known as Passchendaele) from 31 July, where the preliminary 24-day long barrage had destroyed all drainage and heavy rain had soaked the field, the tanks found it heavy going and contributed little; those that sank into the swampy ground were immobilised and became easy targets for enemy artillery.

Nearly 460 Mark IV tanks were used during the Battle of Cambrai in November 1917, showing that a large concentration of tanks could quickly overcome even the most sophisticated trench systems.

In the aftermath of the German spring offensive on the Western Front, the first tank-to-tank battle was between Mk IV tanks and German A7Vs in the Second Battle of Villers-Bretonneux in April 1918. (Note: part of the Battle of the Lys)

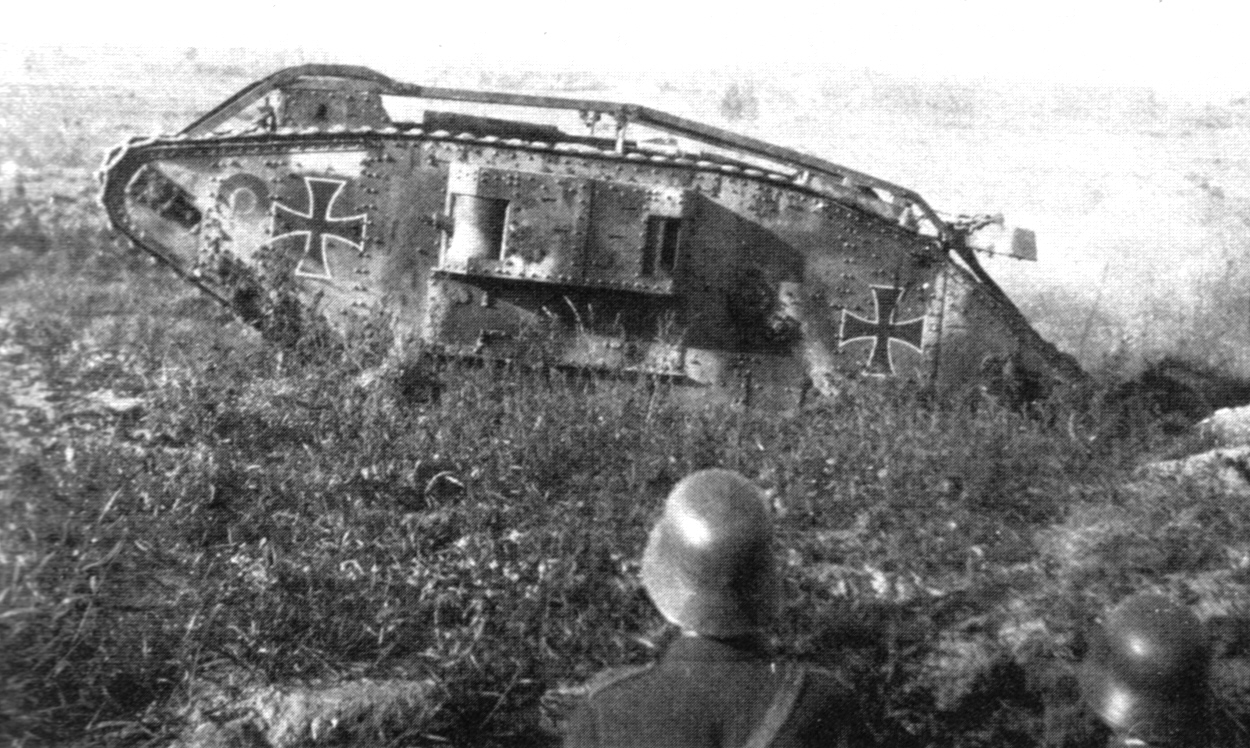
A British Mk IV Beutepanzer during WW1

About 40 captured Mark IVs were employed by the Germans as Beutepanzerwagen (the German word Beute means "loot" or "booty") with a crew of 12. These formed four tank companies from December 1917. Some of these had their six pounders replaced by a German equivalent.

The last Mark IV to see service, briefly, was Excellent, a Mark IV male retained by the naval gunnery school HMS Excellent on Whale Island in Portsmouth harbour. In 1940 it was restored to operational status and driven to the mainland, where its new career was allegedly brought to an early end after damaging a car.

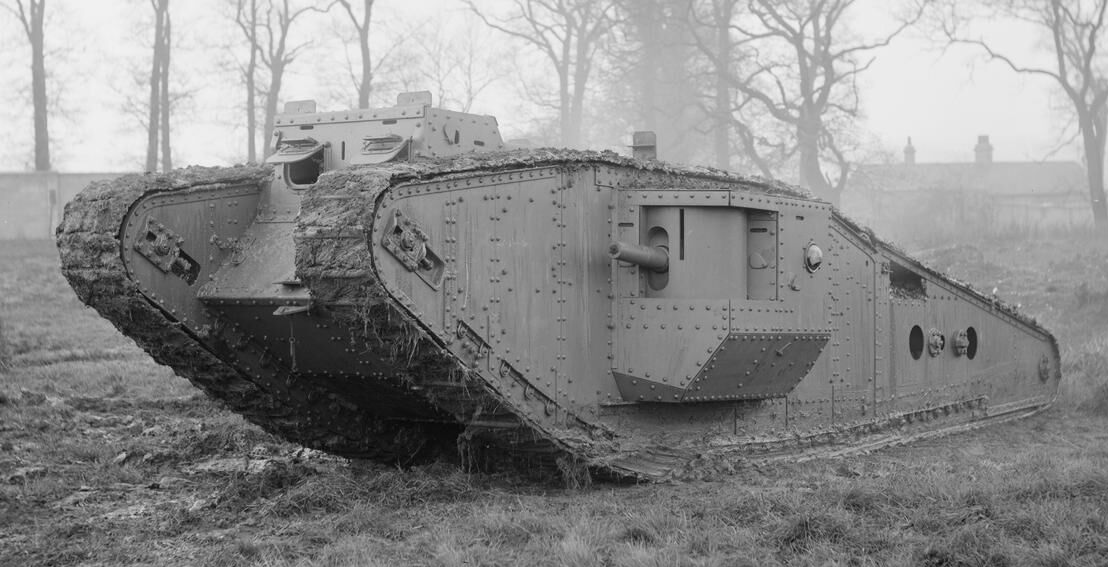
A British Mark IV tank with Tadpole Tail.

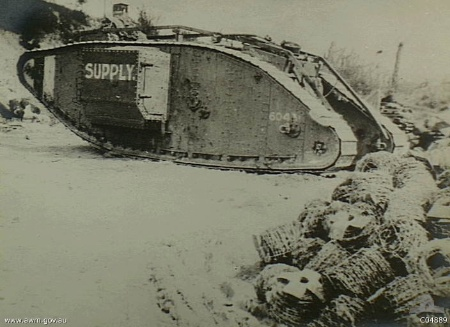
Unarmed supply tank variant going up to the line at Villers-Bretonneux, August 1918

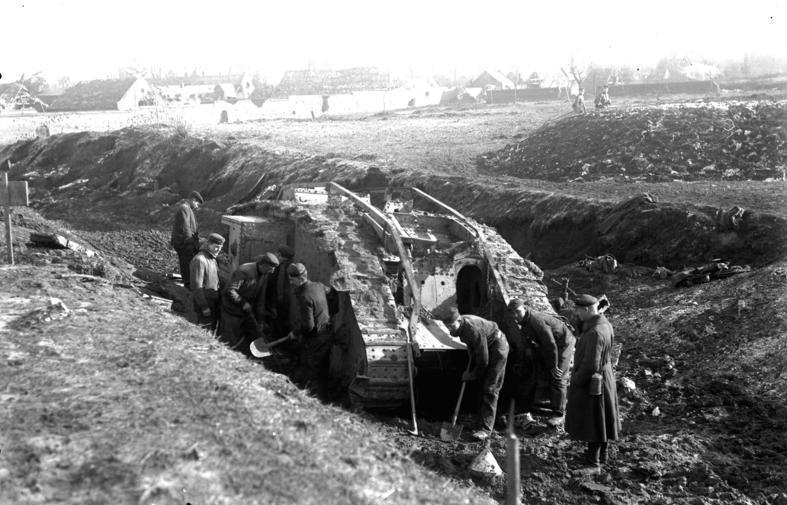
Mark IV tank being dug out by German troops at Cambrai, November 1917

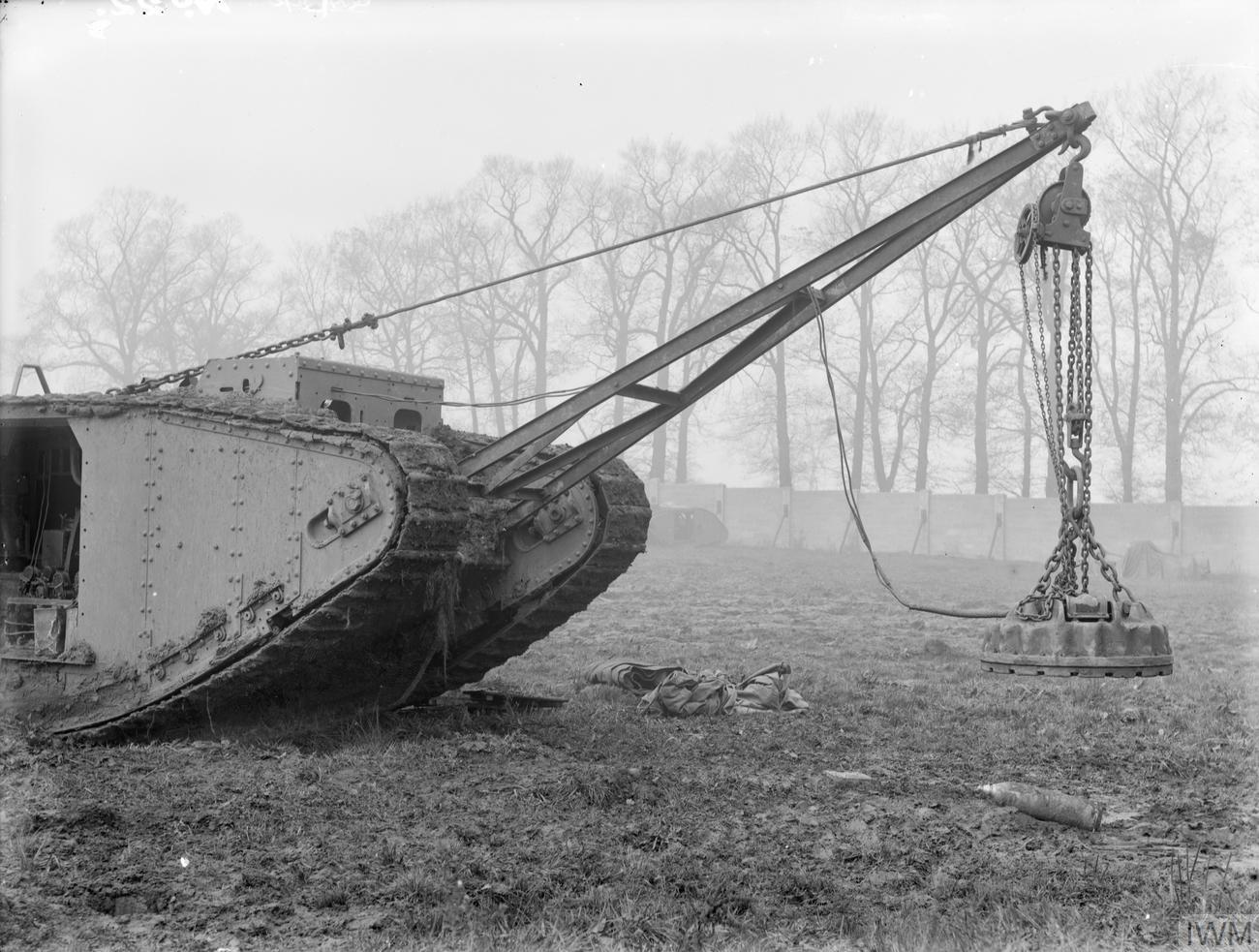
Mark IV salvage tank using an experimental magnetic clutch

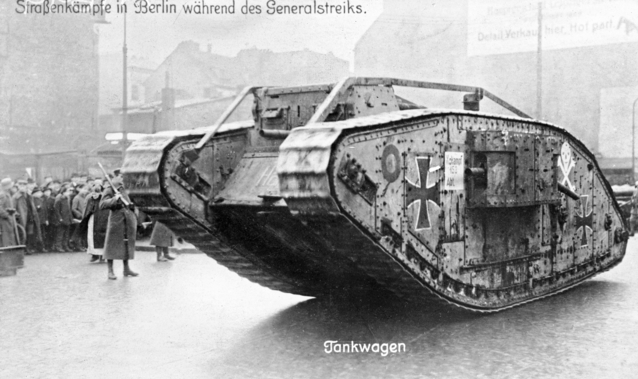
Captured Mark IV used by the Weimar Republic to suppress a Spartacus League riot during the German Revolution, 1919.

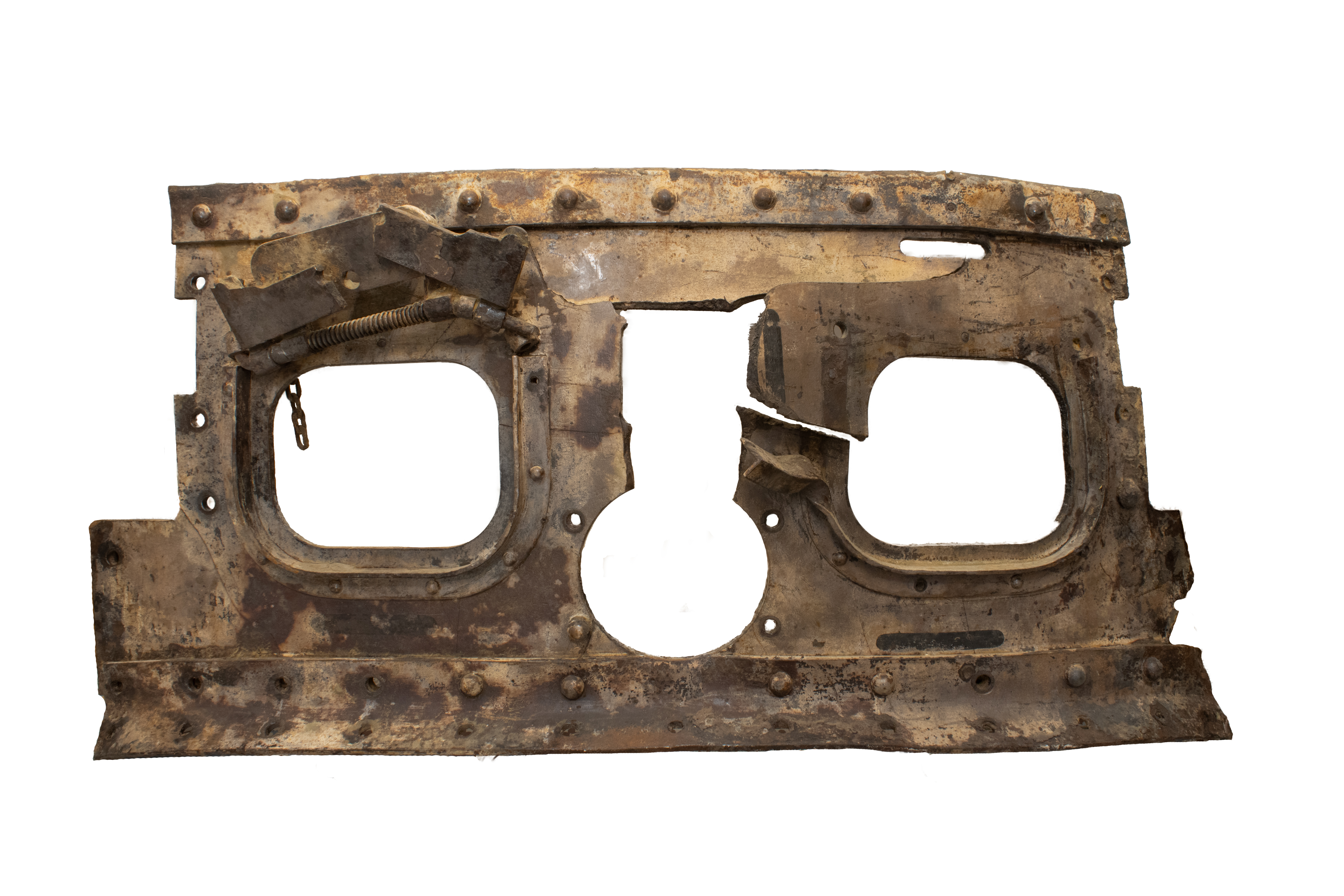
Front armor plate from a Mk IV tank destroyed during the Battle of Passchendaele, unearthed in 2017.

== Surviving vehicles ==
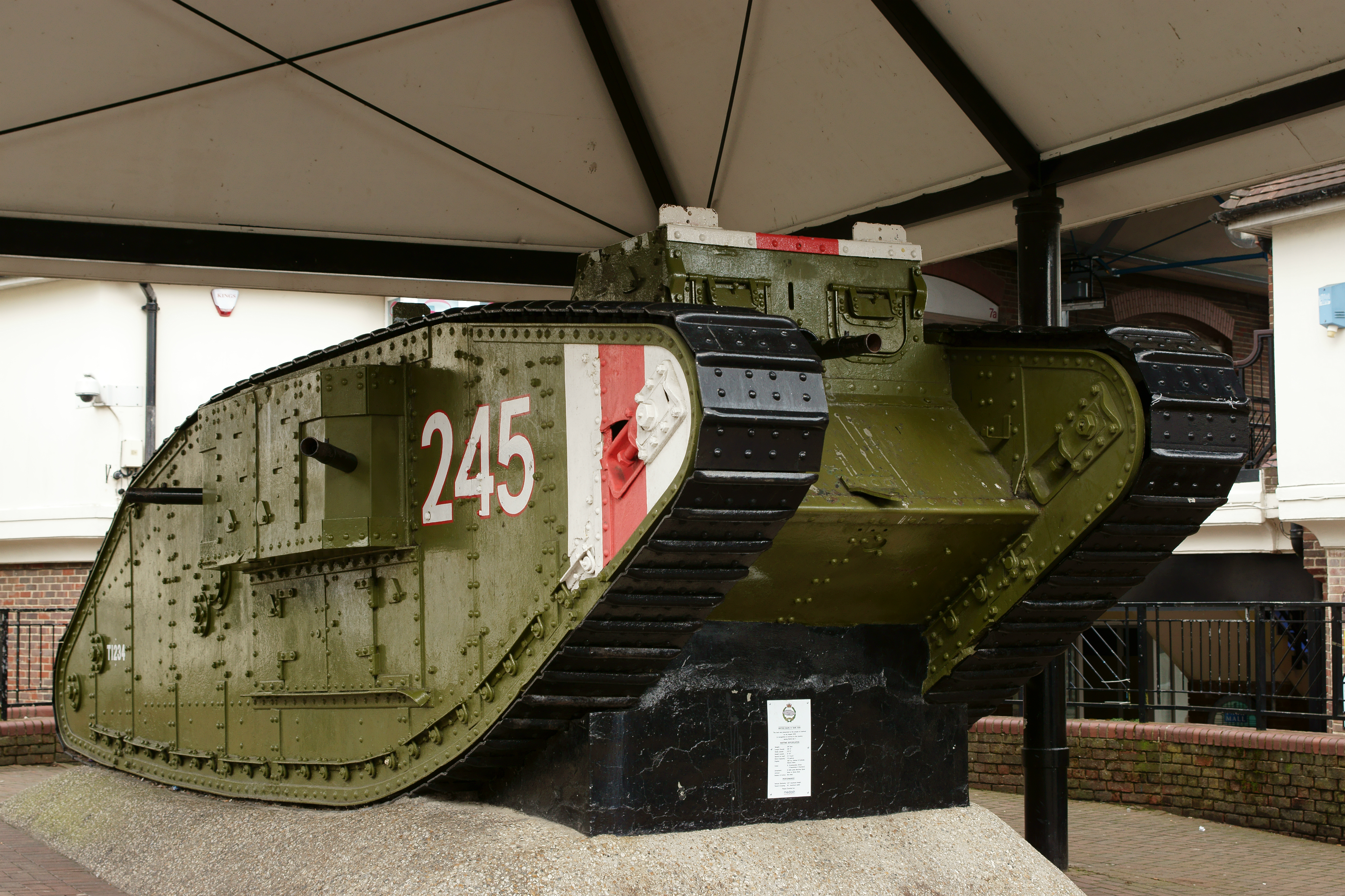
Mark IV female on display in Ashford, Kent. The white-red-white stripes on the front are a British recognition marking that was also carried by British tanks early in WW II

- A Mark IV Female that fought at the Battle of Cambrai is at the Museum of Lincolnshire Life, Lincoln. A local company, William Foster & Co., manufactured the first tanks, although as the only Mark IVs built in Lincoln were Male, this vehicle was probably built by Metropolitan in Birmingham. Recent research had put the identity of this tank into doubt, a partial serial number was found in 2014 that suggests this tank is not in fact Flirt II, as it was previously described.
- A Mark IV Female is preserved at Ashford in Kent. This is one of many that were presented for display to towns and cities in Britain after the war; most were scrapped in the 1920s and 1930s. The engine was removed to install an electricity substation inside it. This was then removed a decade or so later to leave an empty interior.

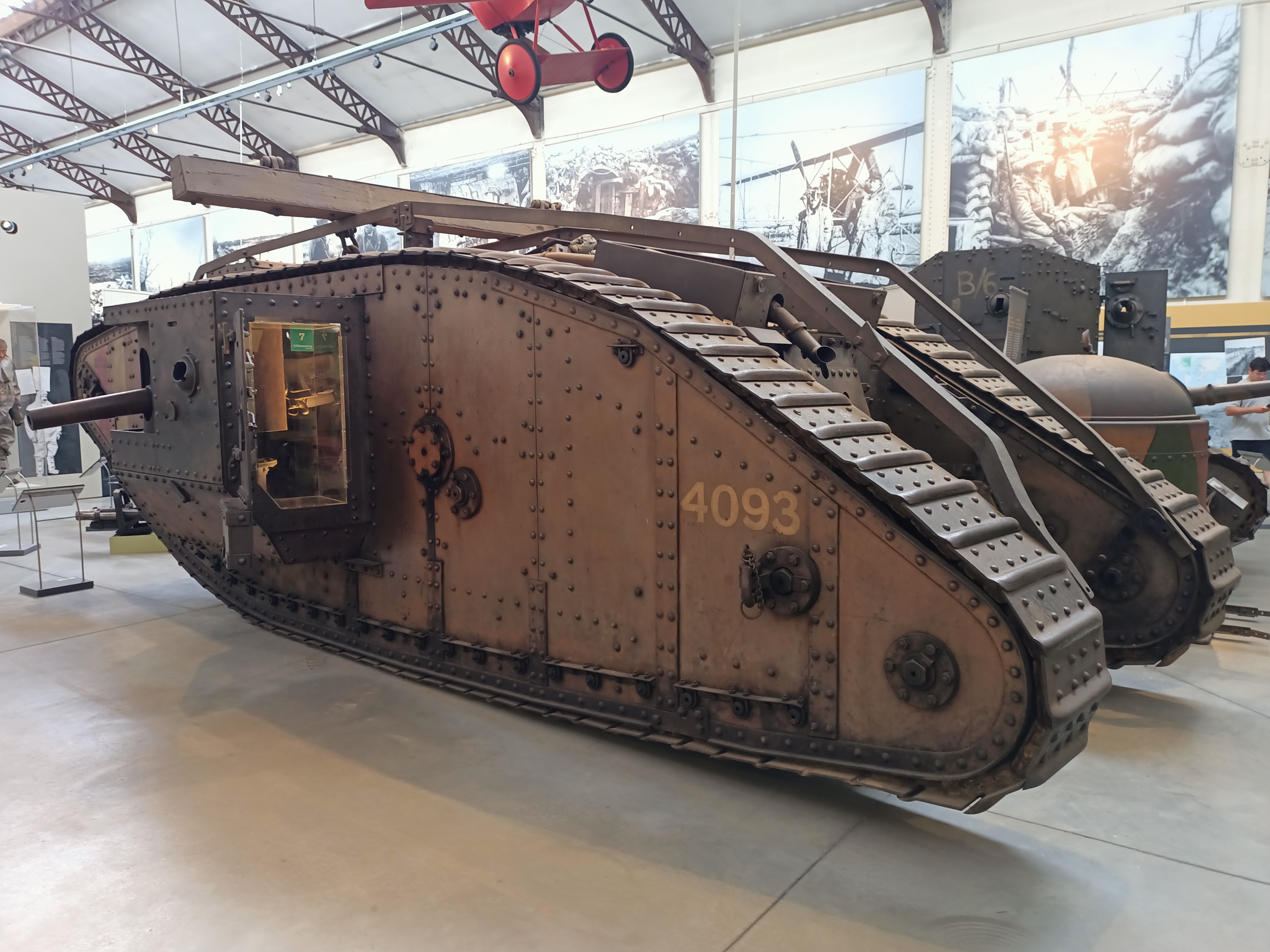
Mark IV in Brussels

- The Royal Museum of the Armed Forces in Brussels has a Male Mark IV tank, Lodestar III, still in original colours.
- A Mark IV Female, Grit, is owned by the Australian War Memorial.
- A Mark IV Male, Excellent, is displayed at The Tank Museum in Bovington Camp. This tank was presented by the army to HMS Excellent, a Royal Navy shore establishment where some tank crewmen were trained during WWI. It was very briefly restored to running condition in 1940, with a view to assisting in home defence, but did not see service. It was donated to the Tank Museum in 1971.
- Mark IV Female Liberty: stored at Anniston Army Depot, Anniston, Alabama, US. After decades of exposure to the elements it is in poor condition, but is now in the Armor Restoration Shop at Fort Benning, Georgia where it is being stored ahead of restoration.
- A Mark IV Female, D51: Deborah, was excavated at the village of Flesquières in France in 1999. It had been knocked out by shell-fire at the Battle of Cambrai and subsequently buried when used to fill a crater. Badly damaged and corroded when rediscovered, Deborah has been stabilised and is now housed in a small museum at Flesquières, close to the graves of members of the crew.

== Popular culture ==
- On the map "Origins" in Call Of Duty: Black Ops 2 the character Tank Dempsey, one of the main protagonists of the game's Zombies mode, is seen killing zombies on the Mk IV during the introduction cutscene. The Mk IV is also featured on the map as a rideable transport following a predetermined route.
- In the film War Horse, the title character, Joey, narrowly escapes a Mark IV tank.
- In the anime film series Girls und Panzer das Finale, a Mark IV becomes Ooarai's ninth tank. It is operated by pirate themed "Shark Team", humorously referencing the Mark IV's nickname as a "landship".
- To commemorate the centenary of the development of the Tank, in 2017 Channel 4, the JCB company and Guy Martin with the help of the Norfolk Tank Museum constructed a running replica Mk IV female (named Deborah II) for the television documentary Guy Martin's WWI Tank. Deborah II is now on permanent display at the Norfolk Tank Museum
- On Transformers: The Last Knight, an elderly Autobot named Bulldog transforms to an army green Mark IV tank.
- In the Twisted Metal 4 video game, one of the selectable characters General Warthog's vehicle of choice resembles a Mark IV tank.

== See also ==
- Mark V tank
- Steam tank: an unsuccessful US design based on the Mark IV, but steam-powered and armed with a flamethrower.
