= 38M Botond =

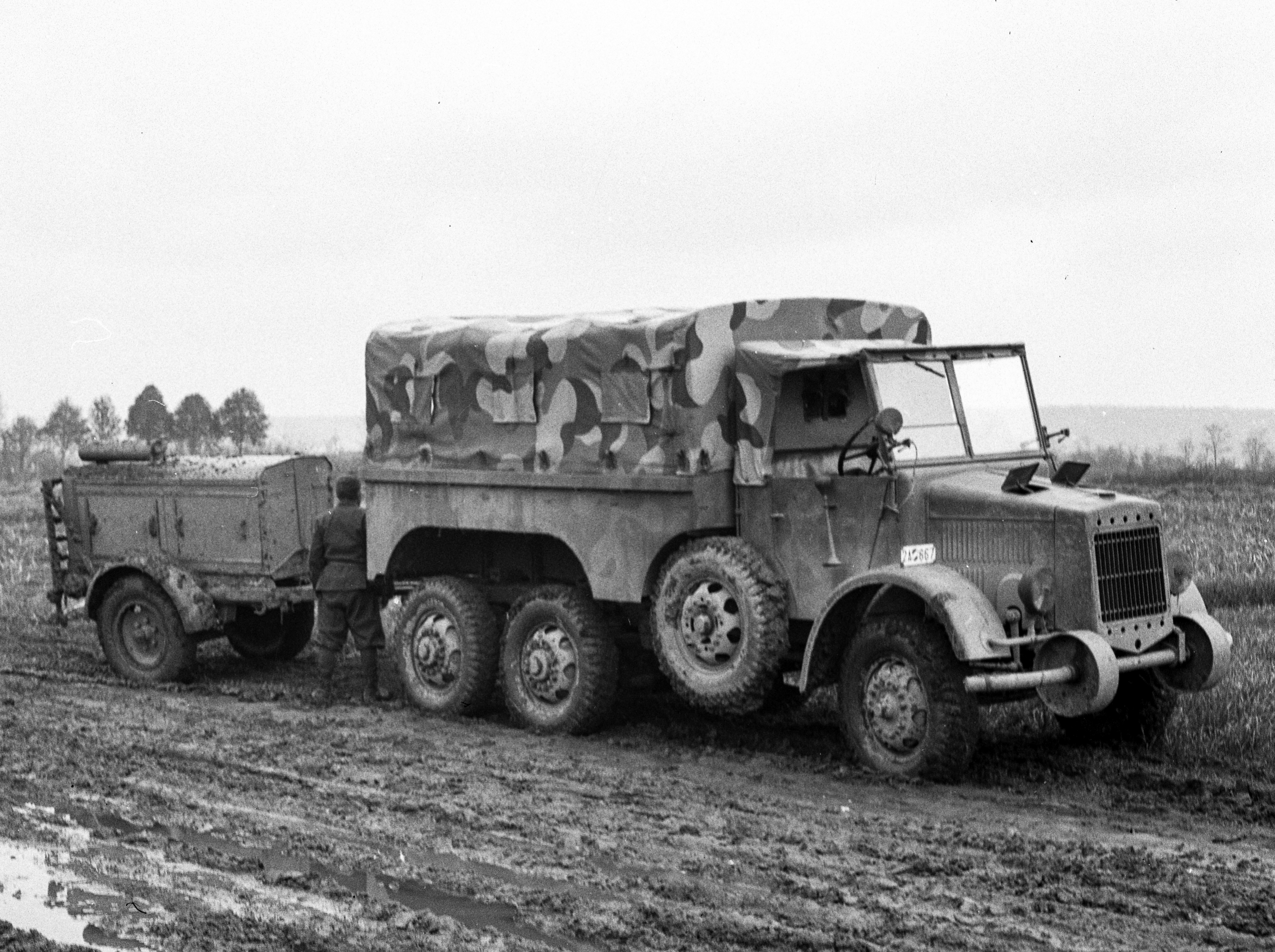
- Rába 38M Botond in 1941
- Type: all-terrain truck
- Place of origin: Kingdom of Hungary

Service history
- Used by: Kingdom of Hungary
- Wars: World War II

Production history
- Designed: 1938
- Manufacturer: MWG
- Produced: 1938–1948
- No. built: 2,554

Specifications
- Mass: 2,000 kg
- Length: 5,700 mm
- Width: 2,080 mm
- Height: 2,550 mm
- Crew: 1
- Engine: 4 cylinder petrol of 4,330 cm3 70 hp
- Payload capacity: 1,500 kg (2+14 persons)
- Drive: 6×4
- Operational range: 380 km (on road)
- Maximum speed: 60 km/h

Rába 38M Botond was a Hungarian military all-terrain truck. Designed by Győr-based Rába Magyar Vagon- és Gépgyár works, it was extensively used by the Royal Hungarian Army during World War II. The truck was based on a successful Raba AFi 1.5 ton 4×2 truck chassis, but was built with a 6×4 drivetrain to improve off-road performance. This 1.5 ton lorry was used to ferry both cargo and personnel.

There is only one surviving truck, currently in the Transport Museum of Budapest.

== Design and development ==
Development of the new vehicle for the Royal Hungarian Army started in 1937, when Dezső Winkler was ordered by the Ministry of Defence to create a project of a 1.5-ton lorry to be used as personnel carrier.

In order to have the ability for higher cross-country mobility but also keep the costs down, the truck received the 6×4 configuration. This was a capable, but relatively complex, design that combined both wishbone and bogie systems. (Note: Most 6×4 of-road lorries of this period used a simpler bogie system, with leaf springs) The rear wheel stations were each attached by an unequal-arm double wishbone suspension with long wishbones, the upper wishbones hinged from the chassis rails and the lower from the final drive casings. These were supported by a bogie system of two longitudinal levers above the wishbones, pivoted in the centre and supported by two coil springs to the lower wishbone for each wheel, rather than leaf springs. The drivetrain was central, with final drives mounted on chassis crossmembers and propeller shafts between them, the second axle being driven by a bevel pinion on the first crown wheel. Drive shafts to each wheel were jointed with universal joints. The chassis was a ladder with two wide-spaced rails, typical for the period, but not the backbone chassis that would later become the distinctively Eastern European pattern for wishbone-suspension off-road chassis. Overall the suspension was very effective, but complex and with many joints and bearings needing to be preserved from mud, impact damage and kept lubricated. (Note: Some bogie suspensions, like that of the Scammell Pioneer, could keep much of their drivetrain enclosed in a sealed oil bath.) The sophisticated steel alloy needed to make highly-stressed coil springs rather than cruder leaf springs, also became a limitation on production in 1944 when strategic alloying elements like nickel and chromium were in short supply.

To aid in difficult terrain, the construction received a number of innovative mechanisms. One was the second axle, free-rolling but unpowered, raised above the ground level and in contact only at the peak of a summit. Another innovation was a set of two rollers mounted at the front bumper that were intended as an unditching roller to aid in crossing of ditches. The latter feature was a copy of a similar mechanism used in the 31M H-2 lorry designed by Zsigmond Hollós of the Manfred Weiss Steel and Metal Works (HMW).

Two prototypes were built and were well received by the Ministry of Defence. The initial configuration allowed for 14 people to be transported in an open cargo compartment and the cab.

The lorry was designed to be able to tow up to 2000 kilograms in a trailer, it was also equipped with a factory-installed winch.

== Production and variants ==
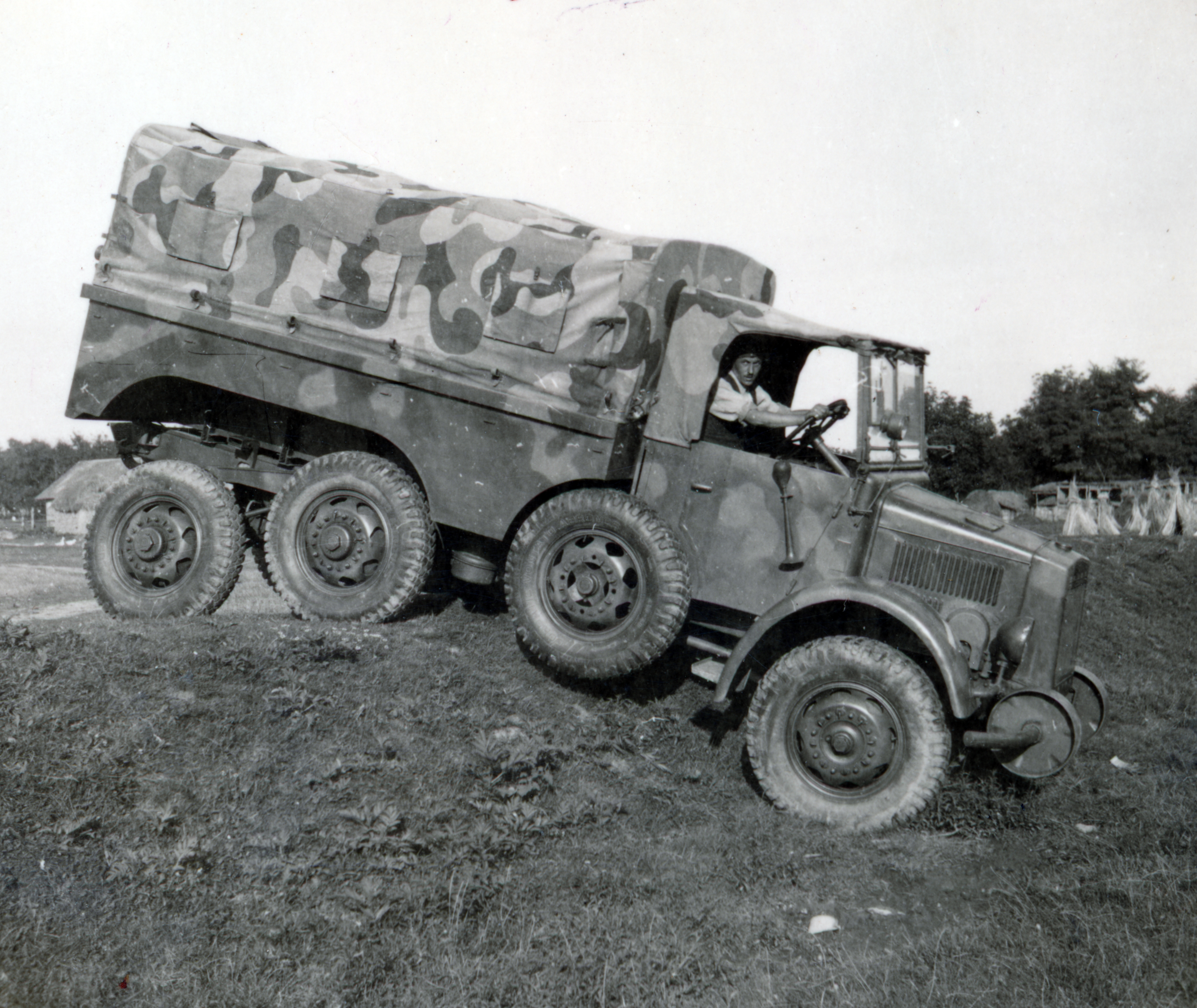
38M Botond during terrain trials, 1940

As no factory in Hungary could cope with such a massive government order, the 38M Botond was built by a consortium of six companies, with HMW and Mavag as the main contractors and Láng, Ganz Works and HSCS works producing various parts. The truck was named after 10th-century legendary warrior Botond.

Between 1938 and 1941 the consortium built 1443 38M Botond trucks. When Hungary joined World War II, a new version (dubbed 38M Botond B) entered serial production. Only minor changes to the design were introduced: some steel parts were replaced with cheaper and easier to obtain materials, the engine power was increased from 70 to 72 horsepower. The ministry ordered 1400 more vehicles in 1942 and an additional order for 657 vehicles followed in 1943 (all Botond B variant). However, some completed and half-completed lorries were destroyed by Allied bombers during bombing raids on MW works and MAVAG.

As the design proved adequate, it was often field-converted to various roles, including radio cars, command vehicles, artillery tractors and tank transporters. Although some of the factories were destroyed, the production continued well into 1944, with 882 out of 2098 trucks ordered for that year delivered to the armed forces. After the Soviet take-over of Hungary several trucks were completed out of spare parts and delivered to the Ministry of Defence in 1948.

In 1943 an upgraded version, the 38M Botond C was designed. It featured a 100 HP six-cylinder engine. However, the sole prototype was destroyed in an Allied air raid. After the war the works on the C version briefly resumed, but were abandoned as a D-350 Steyr truck licence-built by Csepel was found to be a much superior design. The remaining pieces were gradually withdrawn from military units in favour of the D-350.
